= 1937 Pulitzer Prize =

Awards for journalism and related fields

The following are the Pulitzer Prizes for 1937.

== Journalism awards ==
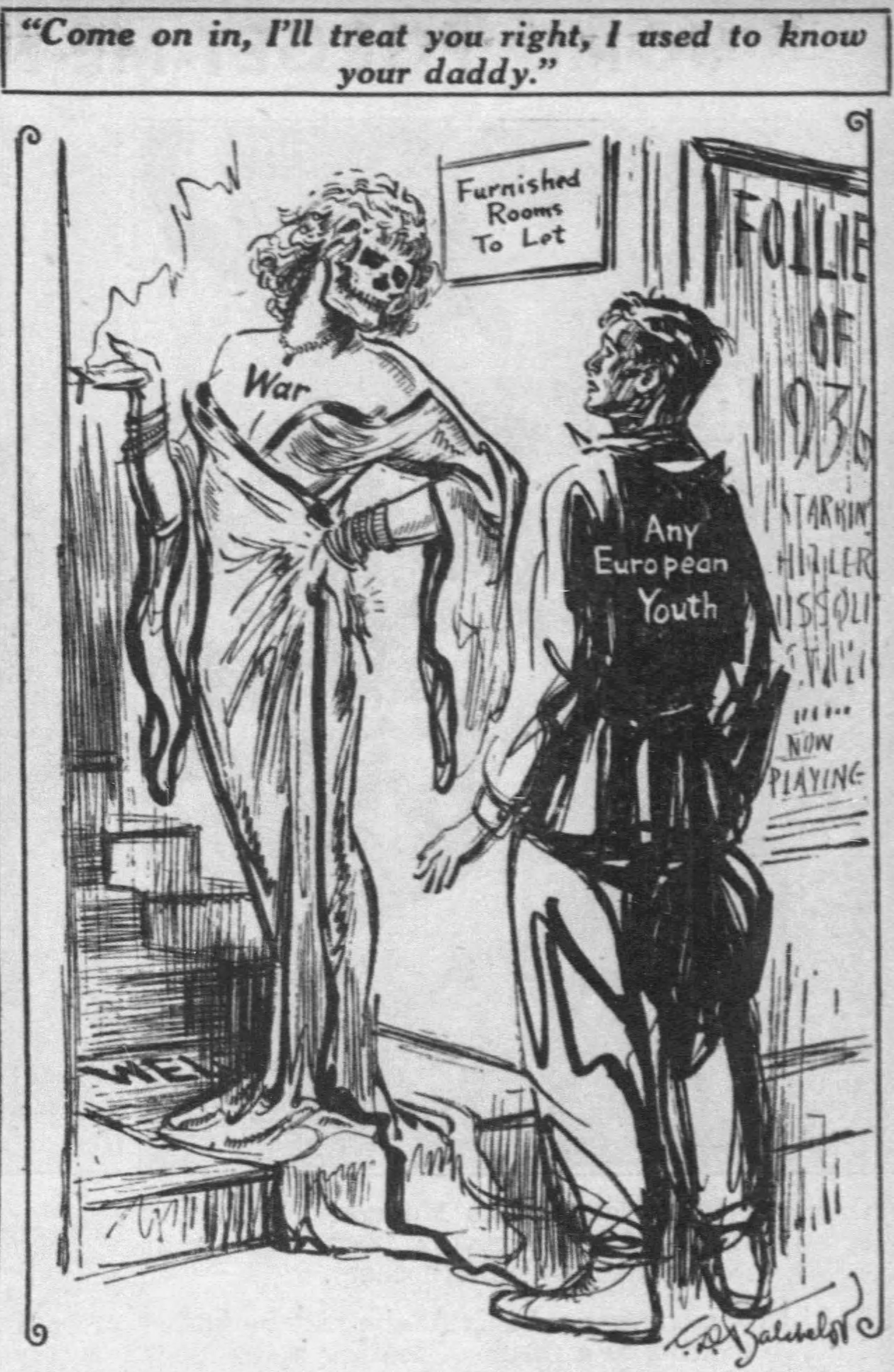
The prize-winning editorial cartoon by C. D. Batchelor

- Public Service:
  - St. Louis Post-Dispatch, for its exposure of wholesale fraudulent registration in St. Louis. By a coordinated news, editorial and cartoon campaign this newspaper succeeded in invalidating upwards of 40,000 fraudulent ballots in November and brought about the appointment of a new election board.
  - Honorable mentions to:
    - New York Daily News, for its public health campaign covering venereal diseases and prophylaxis.
    - Providence Journal and Evening Bulletin, for a research study of direct and indirect taxes, based upon one year's detailed expenditures of three families of working people.
    - Cleveland Press, for its investigation and exposé by news, editorials and cartoons of a cemetery racket.
    - The Atlanta Journal, for its campaign by news, editorials and radio to end corruption and inefficiency in the Police Department.
- Reporting:
  - John J. O'Neill of The New York Herald Tribune, William L. Laurence of The New York Times, Howard W. Blakeslee of the Associated Press, Gobind Behari Lal of the Universal Service, and David Dietz of Scripps-Howard, for their coverage of science at the tercentenary of Harvard University.
- Correspondence:
  - Anne O'Hare McCormick of The New York Times, for her dispatches and feature articles from Europe in 1936.
- Editorial Writing:
  - John W. Owens of The Baltimore Sun, for distinguished editorial writing during the year.
  - Honorable mention to W. W. Waymack of the Des Moines Register-Tribune, for a series of editorials on farm tenancy.
- Editorial Cartooning:
  - C. D. Batchelor of The New York Daily News, for "Come on in, I'll treat you right. I used to know your Daddy."
  - Honorable mentions to:
    - John Francis Knott of The Dallas News, for his cartoon on dust storms, "Nature's Answer".
    - Quincy Scott of the Portland Oregonian, for "East Side, West Side", depicting Alfred E. Smith waltzing with the Republican elephant.

== Letters and Drama Awards ==
- Novel:
  - Gone with the Wind by Margaret Mitchell (Macmillan).
- Drama:
  - You Can't Take It with You by Moss Hart and George S. Kaufman (Farrar).
- History:
  - The Flowering of New England 1815–1865 by Van Wyck Brooks (E. P. Dutton).
- Biography or Autobiography:
  - Hamilton Fish by Allan Nevins (Dodd).
- Poetry:
  - A Further Range by Robert Frost (Holt)
