= Gobind Behari Lal =

Indian-American journalist and independence activist

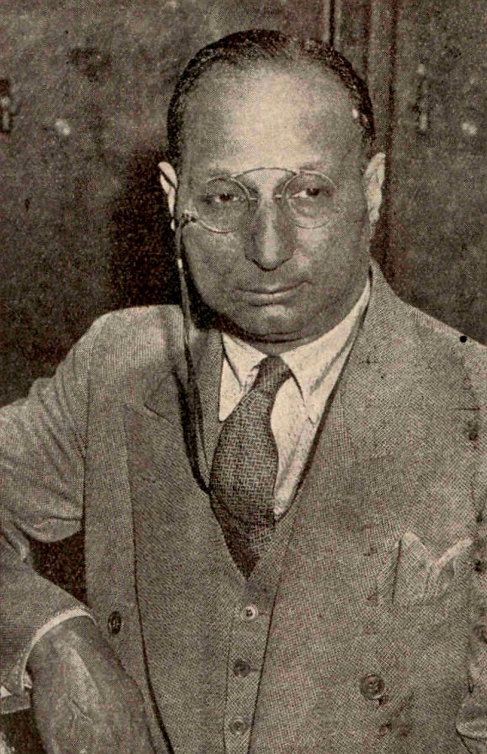
- Lal in 1937
- Born: 9 October 1889; Delhi, British India
- Died: 1 April 1982 (aged 92)
- Other name: Gobind Bihari Lal
- Citizenship: Indian
- Education: B.Sc. M.A.
- Alma mater: Punjab University; University of California, Berkeley
- Occupation: Journalist
- Employer: Hearst Newspapers
- Organization: Ghadar Party
- Title: President of the National Association of Science Writers
- Term: 1940–41
- Predecessor: William L. Laurence
- Successor: John Joseph O'Neill
- Movement: Indian independence movement
- Relatives: Har Dayal
- Awards: Pulitzer Prize (1937); Padma Bhushan (1969)

Gobind Behari Lal was an Indian-American journalist and independence activist. A relative and close associate of Lala Har Dayal, he joined the Ghadar Party and participated in the Indian independence movement. He arrived the United States on a scholarship to study at the University of California, Berkeley. Later, he worked as a science editor for the Hearst Newspapers. In 1937, he became the first Indian and Asian to win the Pulitzer Prize.

== Early life ==
Gobind Behari Lal was born to Bishan Lal, the Governor of the Bikaner princely state. His mother's name was Jagge Devi. He obtained B.Sc. and M.A. degrees from the Punjab University at Lahore. He served as an assistant professor at the University from 1909 to 1912.

Lal was the cousin of the Indian nationalist Lala Har Dayal's wife, and participated in the Indian independence movement. Har Dayal set up the Guru Govind Singh Sahib Educational Scholarship to encourage Indian students to gain scientific education. Lal began attending the University of California, Berkeley in 1912 on this scholarship. He completed his postgraduate education there.

== Career ==
Lal served as the Science Editor for The San Francisco Examiner from 1925 to 1930. He was the first journalist to use the term "Science Writer" in his byline. He went on to work for other Hearst Newspapers concerns in San Francisco, New York and Los Angeles. Lal wrote on a variety of topics, and interviewed many notable figures, including Albert Einstein, Mohandas K. Gandhi, H. L. Mencken, Edna St. Vincent Millay, Enrico Fermi and Max Planck.

Lal shared the 1937 Pulitzer Prize for Reporting with John J. O'Neill, William L. Laurence, Howard W. Blakeslee and David Dietz. The group won the award for their coverage of science at the tercentenary of Harvard University.

Lal was one of the founding members of the National Association of Science Writers, and served as the Association's President in 1940.

Lal died of cancer in 1982 at the age of 92, a few weeks after writing his last article.

== Awards and recognitions ==
- Pulitzer Prize (1937)
- Padma Bhushan (1969)
- Tamra Patra (1973) by Government of India for participating in the Indian independence movement

The Gobind Behari Lal Scholarship in Science Journalism awarded by the Center for South Asia Studies of UC Berkeley was named after him.
