= 1920 Pulitzer Prize =

Awards for journalism and related fields

The following are the Pulitzer Prizes for 1920.

== Journalism awards ==
- Public Service:
  - No award given. Jurors recommended the prize be given to the Minneapolis Daily News for its Americanization campaign, but the Advisory Board declined to make an award.
- Reporting:
  - John J. Leary, Jr. of the New York World, for the series of articles written during the United Mine Workers coal strike of 1919.
- Editorial Writing:
  - Harvey E. Newbranch of the Evening World Herald (Omaha) for an editorial entitled "Law and the Jungle", condemning the Omaha race riot of 1919.

== Letters and Drama Awards ==
- Drama:
  - Beyond the Horizon by Eugene O'Neill (Boni)
- History:
  - The War with Mexico by Justin Harvey Smith (Macmillan)
- Biography or Autobiography:
  - The Life of John Marshall by Albert J. Beveridge (Houghton)
