= Hell-Bent for Heaven =

1926 film

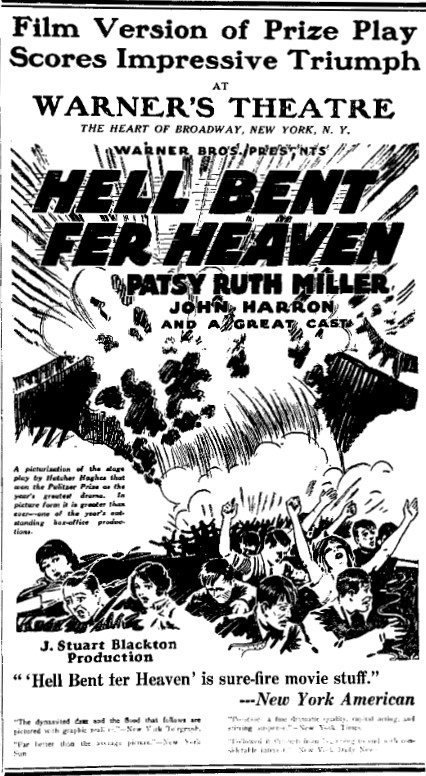
- Advertisement using the play's title
- Directed by: J. Stuart Blackton
- Screenplay by: Marian Constance Blackton
- Based on: Hell-Bent Fer Heaven by Hatcher Hughes
- Produced by: J. Stuart Blackton
- Starring: Patsy Ruth Miller; John Harron; Gayne Whitman; Gardner James
- Cinematography: Nicholas Musuraca
- Production company: Warner Bros.
- Distributed by: Warner Bros.
- Release date: May 1, 1926
- Running time: 70 minutes
- Country: United States
- Language: Silent (English intertitles)

Hell-Bent for Heaven is a 1926 American silent drama film directed by J. Stuart Blackton and written by Marian Constance Blackton. It is based on the 1924 Pulitzer Prize-winning play Hell-Bent Fer Heaven by Hatcher Hughes. The film stars Patsy Ruth Miller, John Harron, Gayne Whitman, Gardner James, Wilfrid North, and Evelyn Selbie. The film was released by Warner Bros. on May 1, 1926.

== Cast ==
- Patsy Ruth Miller as Jude Lowrie
- John Harron as Sid Hunt
- Gayne Whitman as Andy Lowrie
- Gardner James as Rufe Pryer
- Wilfrid North as Matt Hunt
- Evelyn Selbie as Meg Hunt
- James A. Marcus as Dave Hunt
