= 1924 Pulitzer Prize =

Awards for journalism and related fields

The following are the Pulitzer Prizes for 1924.

== Journalism awards ==
- Public Service:
  - New York World, for its work exposing the killing of Martin Tabert, which helped bring the convict leasing system in Florida to an end
- Reporting:
  - Magner White, San Diego Sun, for his story of the eclipse of the sun.
- Editorial Writing:
  - Frank Buxton of the Boston Herald, for an editorial entitled "Who Made Coolidge?"
  - Special prize of $1000 was awarded to the widow of Frank I. Cobb, New York World, in recognition of the distinction of her husband's editorial writing and service.

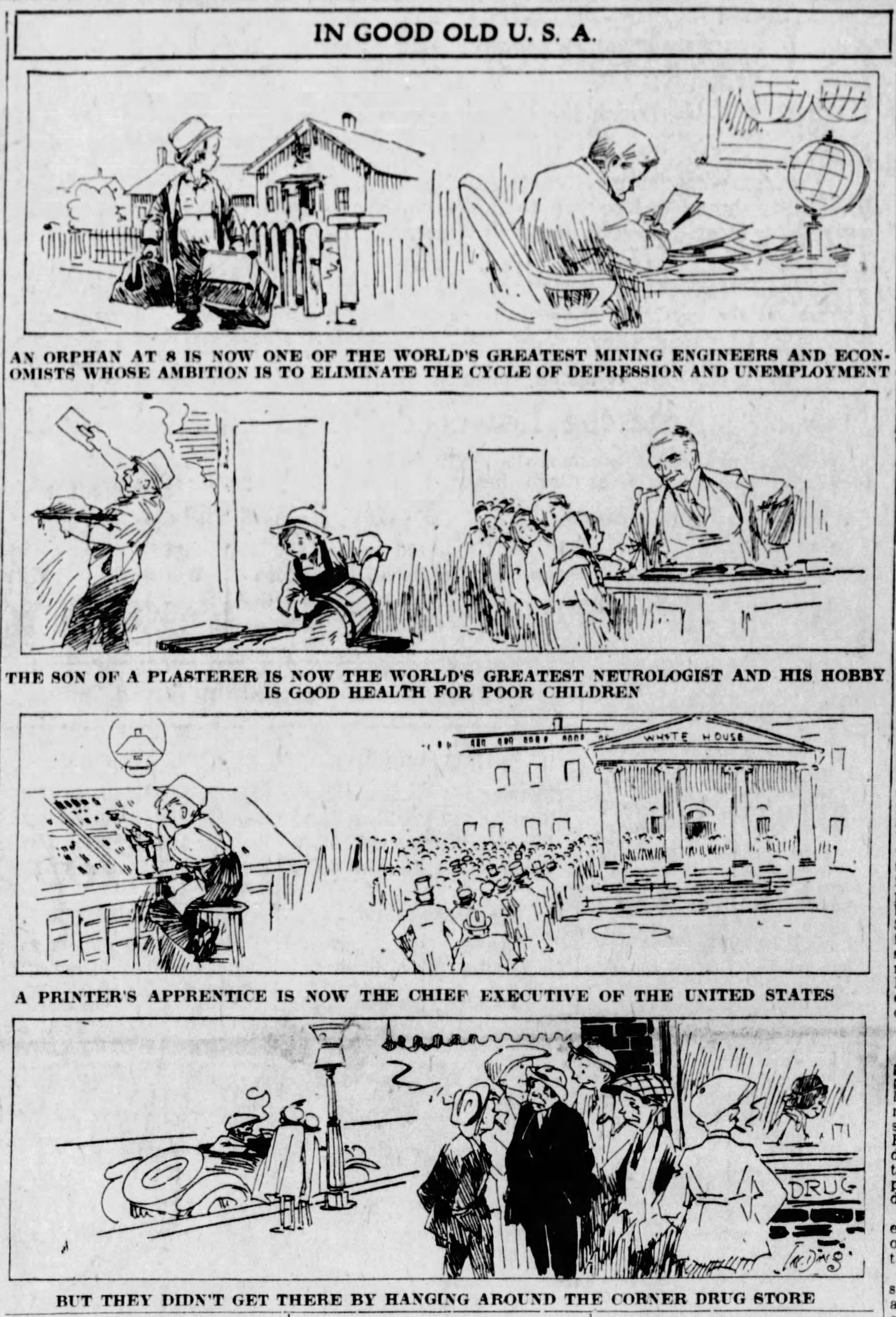
"In Good Old U.S.A.", winner of the prize for Editorial Cartooning

- Editorial Cartooning:
  - Jay Norwood Darling of the Des Moines Register and Tribune for "In Good Old USA".

== Letters and Drama Awards ==
- Novel:
  - The Able McLaughlins by Margaret Wilson (Harper)
- Drama:
  - Hell-Bent Fer Heaven by Hatcher Hughes (Harper)
- History:
  - The American Revolution—A Constitutional Interpretation by Charles Howard McIlwain (Macmillan)
- Biography or Autobiography:
  - From Immigrant to Inventor by Michael I. Pupin (Scribner)
- Poetry:
  - New Hampshire: A Poem with Notes and Grace Notes by Robert Frost (Holt)
