= Doug Larson =

American columnist and editor

Doug Larson (February 10, 1926 – April 1, 2017) was a columnist and editor for the Door County Advocate (1953–1964) and wrote a daily column, "Doug's Dugout," for the Green Bay Press-Gazette (1964–1988), both Wisconsin-based newspapers. The column was originally syndicated through United Media under the title "Senator Soaper Says"; Larson took over authorship in 1980. Previously, it had been written by Bill Vaughn of the Kansas City Star. Larson was born in the city of Sturgeon Bay in Door County, Wisconsin.
