= Rebecca Heisman =

American science writer

Rebecca Heisman is an American science writer and author who focuses on ornithology and is based in Walla Walla, Washington. She is the author of the 2023 book Flight Paths: How a Passionate and Quirky Group of Pioneering Scientists Solved the Mystery of Bird Migration.

== Background ==
Heisman grew up in Ohio and received her bachelor's degree in zoology and environmental studies from Ohio Wesleyan University in 2009. She then received her master's degree in environmental education and interpretation from the University of Wisconsin-Stevens Point.

== Career ==
Heisman worked for the American Ornithological Society from 2015 to 2020 before transitioning to science writing and communication when she moved to Walla Walla with her family. She has written for the Cornell Lab of Ornithology's Living Bird magazine, the American Bird Conservancy's Bird Conservation magazine, Audubon, Scientific American, Hakai, and the BirdNote national radio program.

Flight Paths, published in 2023, describes how naturalists and “migration-obsessed” scientists from a wide variety of scientific disciplines developed the techniques needed to reveal the secrets of where, when, and how birds migrate. The Wall Street Journal called the book “illuminating” and noted that it “does what only the best science books do: It adds to our knowledge of the world without diminishing its wonder.” Ornithology praised it as a "fascinating, informative, and fun read," and Kirkus Reviews similarly called it a "fascinating treat for avid bird-watchers."

In 2020, Heisman was diagnosed with stage 4 Hodgkin's lymphoma and wrote about how birding helped her get through the treatment process amid the COVID-19 pandemic. As a member of the National Association of Science Writers, she also described to fellow writers how she turned her fascination with bird migration research methods into her successful book proposal.

== Awards ==
In 2023, Heisman won the Northwest Science Writers Association “Best of the Northwest” award for institutional science writing, for a Living Bird feature on mountain-dwelling chickadees.
