= Uncle Sam Kicks Out Chinaman =

1886 American political cartoon

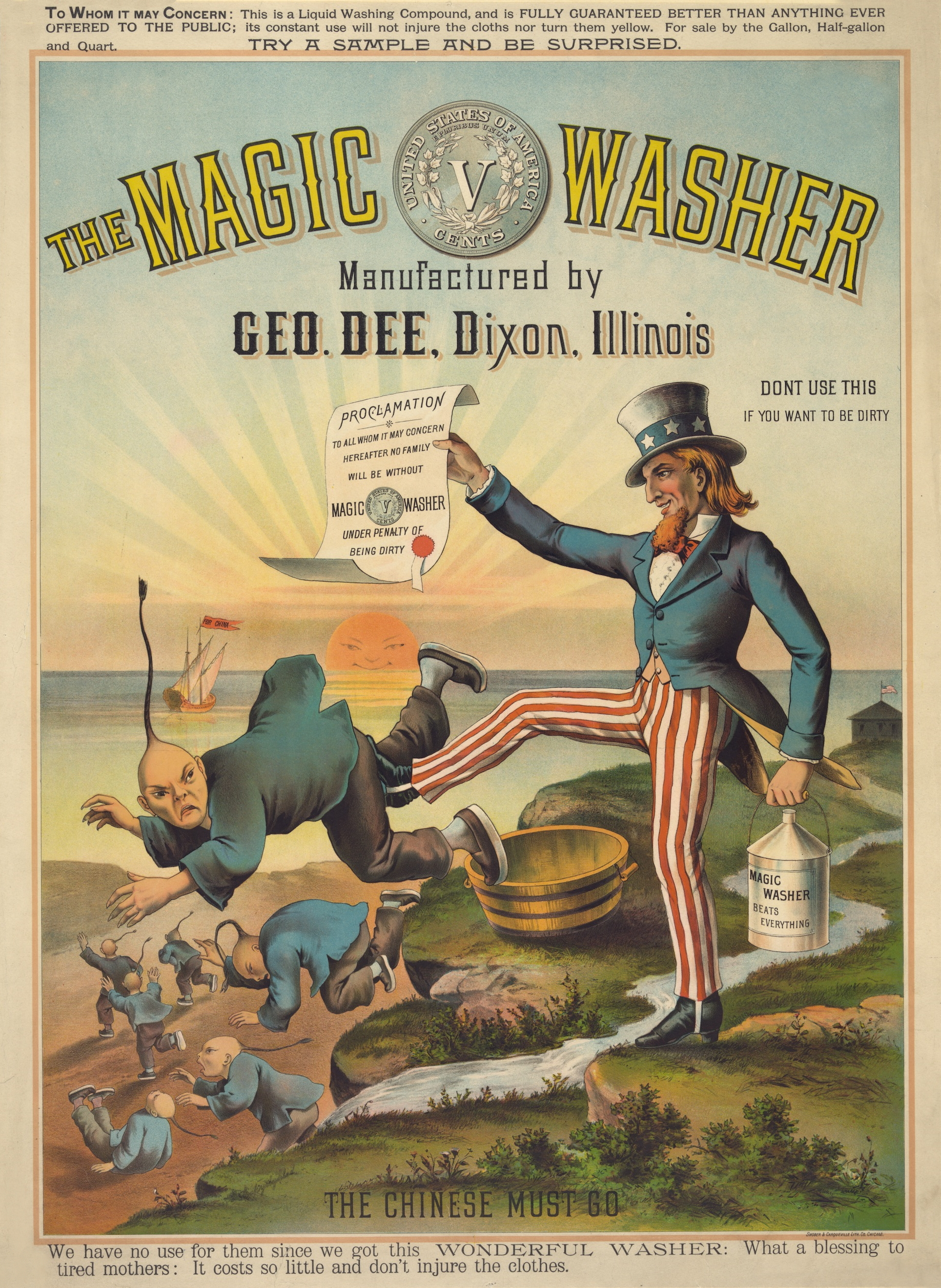
The Magic Washer

The George Dee Magic Washing Machine Company commissioned Uncle Sam Kicks Out The Chinaman in 1886. Published in Chicago by Shober & Carqueville Lithograph Co., the cartoon depicts patriotic symbol Uncle Sam kicking out the Chinese in order to promote The George Dee Magic Washing Machine Company's new detergent in an effort to displace Chinese laundry operators. Above the borders of the image an advertisement in the lithograph reads:

To Whom It May Concern: This is a Liquid Washing Compound, and is FULLY GUARANTEED BETTER THAN ANYTHING EVER OFFERED TO THE PUBLIC; its constant use will not injure the cloths nor turn them yellow. For sale by the Gallon, Half-Gallon and Quart. TRY A SAMPLE AND BE SURPRISED.

== History ==
Chinese immigrants started arriving in America in the 1850s, predominantly in the West Coast and began working as domestic servants that included laundry services. At this time, Chinese immigrants were mostly accepted due to the industry's need for workers and available settlements in western United States, especially in the emergence of the state of California. However, attitudes changed when jobs became scarce and competitive as a result of the nation's economic depression in the 1870s. Companies could hire Chinese immigrants as cheap labor which was viewed as threatening. As an outsider, the Chinese immigrant began taking on the perception of "deceitful...despotic, cruel, filthy, [and] coward[ly]". As a result, violent riots against Chinese immigrants broke out across the American West. In 1880 a destruction of Denver, Colorado's Chinatown resulted in the death of a Chinese immigrant:

Most Americans held racial biases against the Chinese. An example of such a bias comes from a proponent of the Chinese Exclusion Act: Senator John F. Miller of California. Miller was quoted as giving the following description of Chinese men: “machine-like…of obtuse nerve, but little affected by heat or cold, wiry, sinewy, with muscles of iron."1 This quote embodies the view of many Americans at the time, a view that the Chinese were different and therefore deserved different treatment. The image associated with this text is of Uncle Sam using a "magic wash" to rid the United States of the Chinese.

The prejudice continued unhinged.

Within hours the mob destroyed businesses, residences, and killed one Chinese resident. Denver's riot was one of 153 anti-Chinese riots that swept through the American West during the 1870s and 1880s. Because so few Chinese settled in the Great Plains during the nineteenth century, however, the Denver riot was one of two major anti-Chinese incidents to strike the region (the other was in Calgary in 1892).

Speaking to the prejudice of the times, an excerpt from Erika Lee's The Chinese Must Go reads:

From the 1850s through the end of the 19th century, Chinese Americans were systematically harassed, rounded up, and driven out of cities and towns across the West. During the winter of 1858–1859, a veritable race war began in the goldfields, as armed mobs forced Chinese out of various campsites and towns.

When Uncle Sam Kicks Out The Chinaman was published in 1886 America was coming off the heels of the Chinese Exclusion Act of 1882, 4 years after the legislation passed. This legislation compounded the anti-Chinese sentiment in America—an American zeitgeist rife with prejudice towards the Chinese ensued. The Chinese Exclusion Act barred Chinese laborers for 10 years, exempting only the higher classes that could contribute to the American economy: students, teachers, travelers, merchants, and diplomats. In addition to that, it prohibited the Chinese from naturalized citizenship. This racist sentiment became so entrenched in American culture that it was incorporated into marketing, as pathos, such as Uncle Sam Kicks Out The Chinaman depicted here.

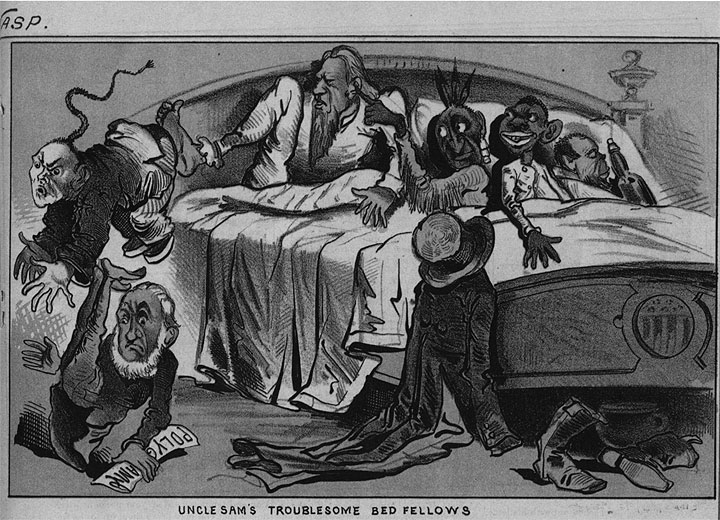
Uncle Sam's Bedfellows (1879)

== Iconography ==
The San Francisco's Illustrated Wasp depicted Uncle Sam in bed with a number of immigrants, and indigenous, kicking out a Chinese immigrant and Mormon polygamist in Uncle Sam’s Troublesome Bedfellows. Uncle Sam Kicks Out The Chinamen set an illustrative symbolism; Uncle Sam with his foot against the bottom of an undesirable, a sign of American reproach and prejudice. The Chinese immigrant image is similarly, and crudely depicted.

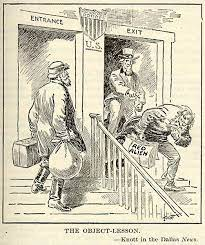
The Object Lesson (1919)

Uncle Sam sits in bed with a Freedman, an Irishman, and a Native American kicking out a Chinamen closely representative of the cartoon that preceded it 14 years earlier. Like Uncle Sam Kicks Out The Chinamen, America acknowledged their involvement and even reliance on immigrants and so called 'undesirables' in Labor and trade as the subtitle “bedfellows” suggests. But the image of kicking out individuals off of a bed or off the shore compounded the level of threat, and extreme prejudice towards specific minority groups deemed reprobate by the American government.

== Influence ==
The cartoon has become historically associated with using Uncle Sam as the symbol of American patriotism and approval. While it was common to see Uncle Sam depicted in political cartoons the particularities of him kicking and forcing out individuals became popularized here. This stark image would go on to be used as a template for American prejudice for decades to come.

Uncle Sam Kicks Out The Chinamen influence stretched beyond the 19th century and well into the 20th following the red scare. In John Francis Knott's The Object Lesson, Uncle Sam stands at the exit of an immigration processing center and kicks out a communist loyalist carrying a stack of newspapers in his hand that reads "Red Alien ''. Following the Palmer Raids of 1919 and 1920, J. Edgar Hoover sanctioned a series of investigations into the cause of a bombing outside the Attorney General A. Mitchell Palmer's home in Washington, D.C. American cartoonists drew on the patriotic symbolism to rebuke perceived foreign and ideological threats set by the cartoon.

Following the controversy surrounding President Donald Trump and his administration's immigration policies, the fear of xenophobic policies such as The Chinese Exclusion Act returned. Vox, a political magazine published an article titled The long history of anti-Asian hate in America, Explained. In it, Li Zhou used the cartoon as a banner in the efforts to fight against xenophobia motivated by a slew of controversial changes to immigration law during Donald Trump's presidency and his allegedly vulgar judgment towards El Salvador, Haiti, and other African countries.

== Legacy ==
The cartoon has long since been associated with American xenophobia within political art. It is one of the most commonly used images to depict the racist mood of the country during the Anti Chinese legislation at the end of the 19th century and beyond.
