= 1931 Pulitzer Prize =

Awards for journalism and related fields

The following are the Pulitzer Prizes for 1931.

== Journalism awards ==
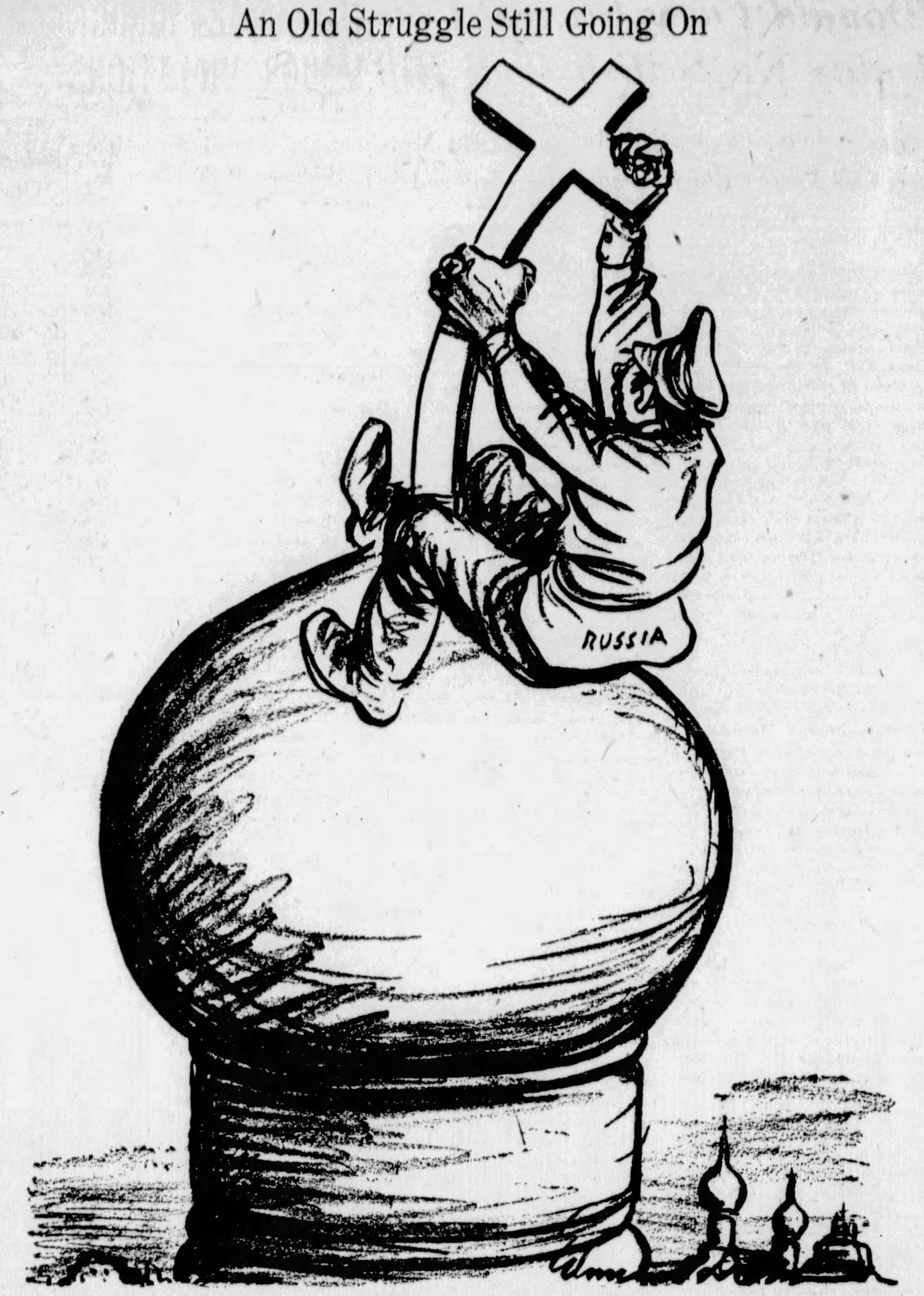
"An Old Struggle Still Going On", winner of the prize for editorial cartooning.

- Public Service:
  - The Atlanta Constitution, for a successful municipal graft exposure and consequent convictions.
- Reporting:
  - A. B. MacDonald of The Kansas City Star, for his work in connection with a murder in Amarillo, Texas.
- Correspondence:
  - H. R. Knickerbocker of the Philadelphia Public Ledger and New York Evening Post, for a series of articles on the practical operation of the Five Year Plan in Russia.
- Editorial Writing:
  - Charles S. Ryckman of Fremont Tribune, for the editorial entitled "The Gentleman from Nebraska."
- Editorial Cartooning:
  - Edmund Duffy of The Baltimore Sun, for "An Old Struggle Still Going On".

== Letters and Drama Awards ==
- Novel:
  - Years of Grace by Margaret Ayer Barnes (Houghton)
- Drama:
  - Alison's House by Susan Glaspell (S. French)
- History:
  - The Coming of the War 1914 by Bernadotte E. Schmitt (Scribner)
- Biography or Autobiography:
  - Charles W. Eliot by Henry James (Houghton)
- Poetry:
  - Collected Poems by Robert Frost (Holt)
