= NASW =

NASW can mean:

- National Association of Social Workers
- National Association of Science Writers
