= Pulitzer Prize for Reporting =

Former American journalism award

The Pulitzer Prize for Reporting was awarded from 1917 to 1947, when it was merged with the Telegraphic Reporting – National category into National Reporting.

== Winners ==
Year	Name(s)	Publication	Rationale
1917	Herbert Bayard Swope	New York World	"for articles which appeared October 10, October 15 and from November 4 daily to November 22, 1916, inclusive, entitled, 'Inside the German Empire.'"
1918	Harold A. Littledale	New York Post	"for a series of articles exposing abuses in and leading to the reform of the New Jersey State Prison."
1919	No award		
1920	John J. Leary Jr.	New York World	"for the series of articles written during the national coal strike in the winter of 1919."
1921	Louis Seibold	New York World	"for an interview with President Wilson." (Note: This interview was later exposed as fraudulent.)
1922	Kirke Simpson	Associated Press	"for articles on the burial of 'The Unknown Soldier'."
1923	Alva Johnston	The New York Times	"for his reports of the proceedings of the convention of the American Association for the Advancement of Science held in Cambridge, Massachusetts in December 1922."
1924	Magner White	San Diego Sun	"for his story of the eclipse of the sun."
1925	Alvin Goldstein	Chicago Daily News	"for their service toward the solution of the murder of Robert Franks Jr., in Chicago on May 22, 1924, and the bringing to justice of Nathan F. Leopold and Richard Loeb."
1925	James Mulroy	Chicago Daily News	"for their service toward the solution of the murder of Robert Franks Jr., in Chicago on May 22, 1924, and the bringing to justice of Nathan F. Leopold and Richard Loeb."
1926	William Burke Miller	Courier Journal	"for his work in connection with the story of the trapping in Sand Cave, Kentucky, of Floyd Collins."
1927	John Rogers	St. Louis Post-Dispatch	"for the inquiry leading to the impeachment of Judge George W. English of the United States Court for the Eastern District of Illinois."
1928	No award		
1929	Paul Y. Anderson	St. Louis Post-Dispatch	"for his highly effective work in bringing to light a situation which resulted in revealing the disposition of liberty bonds purchased and distributed by the Continental Trading Company in connection with naval oil leases."
1930	Russell Owen	The New York Times	"for his reports by radio of the Byrd Antarctic Expedition."
1931	A. B. MacDonald	The Kansas City Star	"for his work in connection with a murder in Amarillo, Texas."
1932	D. D. Martin	Detroit Free Press	"for their account of the parade of the American Legion during the 1931 convention in Detroit."
1932	J. S. Pooler	Detroit Free Press	"for their account of the parade of the American Legion during the 1931 convention in Detroit."
1932	W. C. Richards	Detroit Free Press	"for their account of the parade of the American Legion during the 1931 convention in Detroit."
1932	J. N. W. Sloan	Detroit Free Press	"for their account of the parade of the American Legion during the 1931 convention in Detroit."
1932	F. D. Webb	Detroit Free Press	"for their account of the parade of the American Legion during the 1931 convention in Detroit."
1933	Francis Jamieson	Associated Press	"for his prompt, full, skillful and prolonged coverage of news of the kidnapping of the infant son of Charles Lindbergh on March 1, 1932 from the first announcement of the kidnapping until after the discovery of the baby's body nearby the Lindbergh home on May 12."
1934	Royce Brier	San Francisco Chronicle	"for his account of the lynching of the kidnappers, John M. Holmes and Thomas H. Thurmond in San Jose, California. On November 26, 1933 after they had been jailed for abducting Brooke Hart, a merchant's son."
1935	William Taylor	New York Herald Tribune	"for the series of articles on the international yacht races."
1936	Lauren D. Lyman	The New York Times	"for the exclusive story revealing that the Charles Lindbergh family was leaving the United States to live in England."
1937	Howard W. Blakeslee	Associated Press	"for their coverage of science at the tercentenary of Harvard University."
1937	David Dietz	Scripps-Howard Newspapers	"for their coverage of science at the tercentenary of Harvard University."
1937	Gobind Behari Lal	Universal Service	"for their coverage of science at the tercentenary of Harvard University."
1937	William L. Laurence	The New York Times	"for their coverage of science at the tercentenary of Harvard University."
1937	John O'Neill	New York Herald Tribune	"for their coverage of science at the tercentenary of Harvard University."
1938	Ray Sprigle	Pittsburgh Post-Gazette	"for his series of articles, supported by photostats of the essential documents, exposing the one-time membership of Mr. Justice Hugo Black in the Ku Klux Klan."
1939	Thomas Lunsford Stokes	Scripps-Howard Newspapers	"for his series of articles on alleged intimidation of workers for the Works Progress Administration in Pennsylvania and Kentucky during an election. The articles were published in the New York World-Telegram."
1940	Burton Heath	New York World-Telegram	"for his expose of the frauds perpetrated by federal Judge Martin T. Manton, who resigned and was tried and imprisoned."
1941	Westbrook Pegler	New York World-Telegram	"for his articles on scandals in the ranks of organized labor, which led to the exposure and conviction of George Scalise, a labor racketeer."
1942	Stanton Delaplane	San Francisco Chronicle	"for his articles on the movement of several California and Oregon counties to secede to form a forty-ninth state."
1943	George Weller	Chicago Daily News	"for his graphic story of how a U.S. Navy pharmacist's mate under enemy waters in a submarine performed an operation for appendicitis saving a sailor's life."
1944	Paul Schoenstein	New York Journal-American	"for a news story published on August 12, 1943, which saved the life of a two-year-old girl in the Lutheran Hospital of New York City by obtaining penicillin."
1944	Staff	New York Journal-American	"for a news story published on August 12, 1943, which saved the life of a two-year-old girl in the Lutheran Hospital of New York City by obtaining penicillin."
1945	Jack McDowell	The San Francisco Call	"for his campaign to encourage blood donations."
1946	William L. Laurence	The New York Times	"for his eye-witness account of the atom-bombing of Nagasaki and his subsequent ten articles on the development, production, and significance of the atomic bomb."
1947	Frederick Woltman	New York World-Telegram	"for his articles during 1946 on the infiltration of Communism in the United States."
