= National Association of Science Writers =

Organization of science journalists

- Formation: 1934
- Headquarters: New York
- President: Cassandra Willyard
- Executive Director: Tinsley Davis
- Website: https://www.nasw.org/

The National Association of Science Writers (NASW) was created in 1934 by science journalists and reporters. The mission of NASW is "to improve the craft of science journalism and to promote good science reportage". It has been called, "the nation's oldest and largest professional association for science writers".

== History ==
In June 1934, John J. O'Neill, William L. Laurence, Howard W. Blakeslee, Gobind Behari Lal and David Dietz formed NASW as a press association with Dietz as its president.

At a mid-September Cleveland meeting, additional charter members, including staff members of newspapers, were F. B. Coulton, Watson Davis, Victor Henderson, Thomas R. Henry, Waldemar Kaempffert, and Robert D. Potter. The original purpose of NASW was "to foster the dissemination of accurate scientific knowledge by the press".

In December 1934, NASW journalists interviewed Albert Einstein, as reported by the Times Union:

"This is fine society," Dr. Einstein said, as he looked about the room. He was referring to the National Association of Science Writers, which had asked for the interview. He wore a single-breasted oxford gray suit, wing collar and knitted black tie.

NASW was awarded the Clement Cleveland medal of the American Society for the Control of Cancer in 1938, "for their work in writing about cancer".

The NASW incorporated in 1955, pledging itself to "foster the dissemination of accurate information regarding science through all media normally devoted to informing the public". Leaders of the NASW have been freelance and staff reporters for a majority of US newspapers, wire services, magazines, and broadcasters.

As of 2024, the organization reported having 2,260 members, 202 affiliates, and 320 students (2,782 total).

Annually since 1972 NASW has held the Science in Society Awards "to provide recognition — without subsidy from any professional or commercial interest — for investigative or interpretive reporting about the sciences and their impact on modern society". The organization considers granting awards in seven categories: books, commentary, science reporting, science features, long-form narratives, and series.

== See also ==
- Board of Editors in the Life Sciences
- Council for the Advancement of Science Writing
- The Open Notebook
