= C. D. Batchelor =

American cartoonist

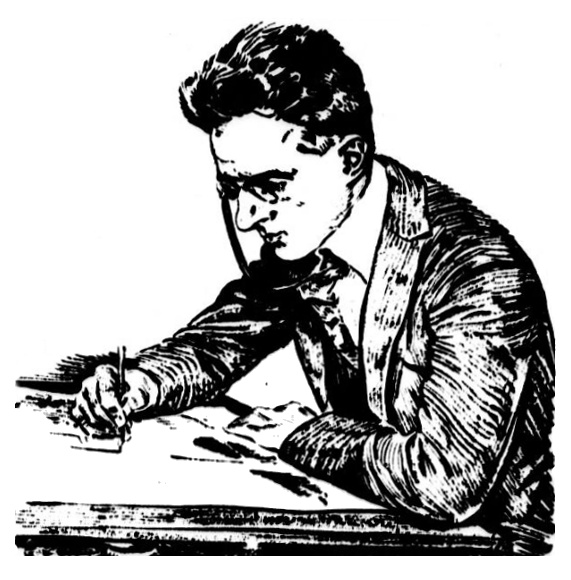
- Born: April 1, 1888; Osage City, Kansas
- Died: September 5, 1977 (aged 89)
- Occupation: Cartoonist

Clarence Daniel Batchelor (April 1, 1888 – September 5, 1977), better known as C. D. Batchelor, was an American editorial cartoonist who was also noted for painting and sculpture. He won a Pulitzer Prize in 1937.

== Biography ==
Batchelor was born April 1, 1988 in Osage City, Kansas. He provided cartoons to the Salina (Kansas) Journal in 1909, while he was a student at the Chicago Art Institute. His journalistic career began in 1911 as a staff artist for the Kansas City Star. From 1914 to 1918 he worked as a free-lance artist. In 1922, his daily syndicated gag panel The Human Zoo began; it would later rerun as Such is Life. He worked as a cartoonist in the New York Post for the Ledger Syndicate until 1931. He then found his permanent niche at the New York Daily News, where he worked until 1969. Batchelor's most famous editorial, published in 1936, reflected the newspaper's isolationist stance and won the Pulitzer Prize for Editorial Cartooning. It depicted a prototypical "Any European Youth" greeted by a skull-faced harlot representing War, captioned "Come on in, I'll treat you right, I used to know your Daddy." Sympathetic to women's suffrage, he contributed cartoons to Woman's Journal and The Woman Voter (which merged with the Journal in 1917). He also contributed his art to the causes of public health and public safety.

Batchelor is also known for having executed a bronze bust of Joseph Medill Patterson, the founder of the Daily News and co-founder of Liberty magazine, and a series of oil murals in The News Building.

== Gallery ==
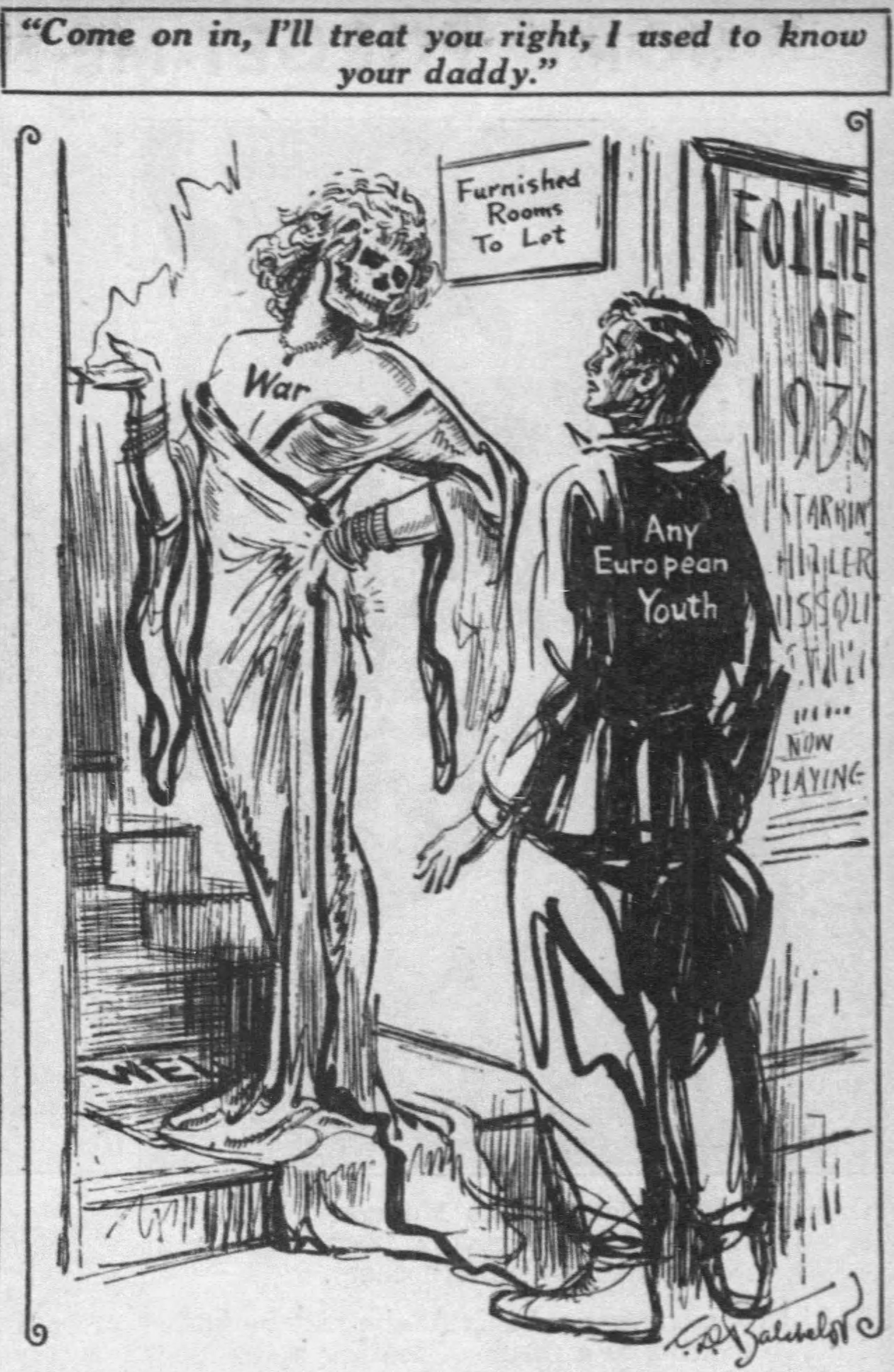
Batchelor's Pulitzer Prize-winning cartoon

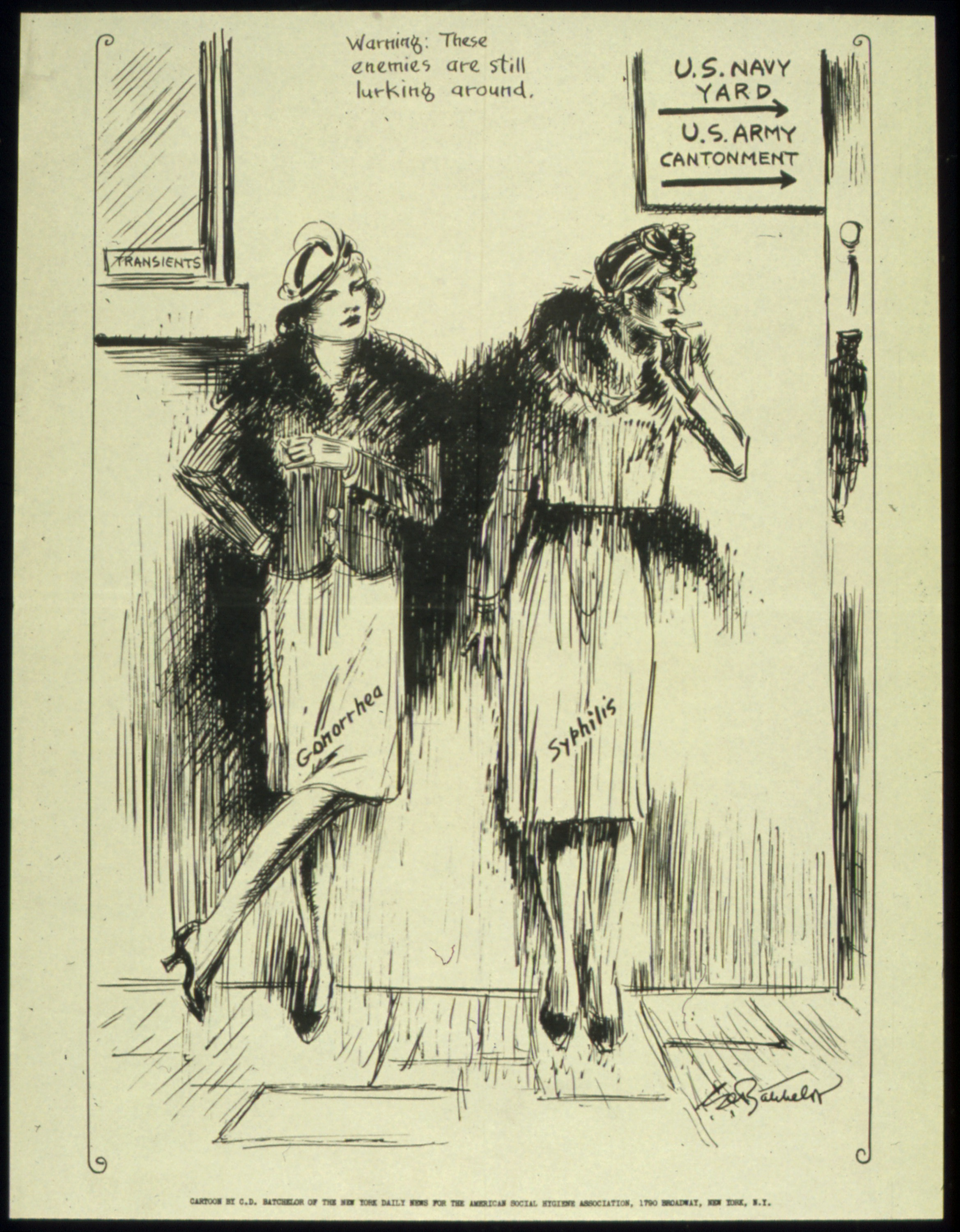
World War II anti-venereal disease poster by Batchelor

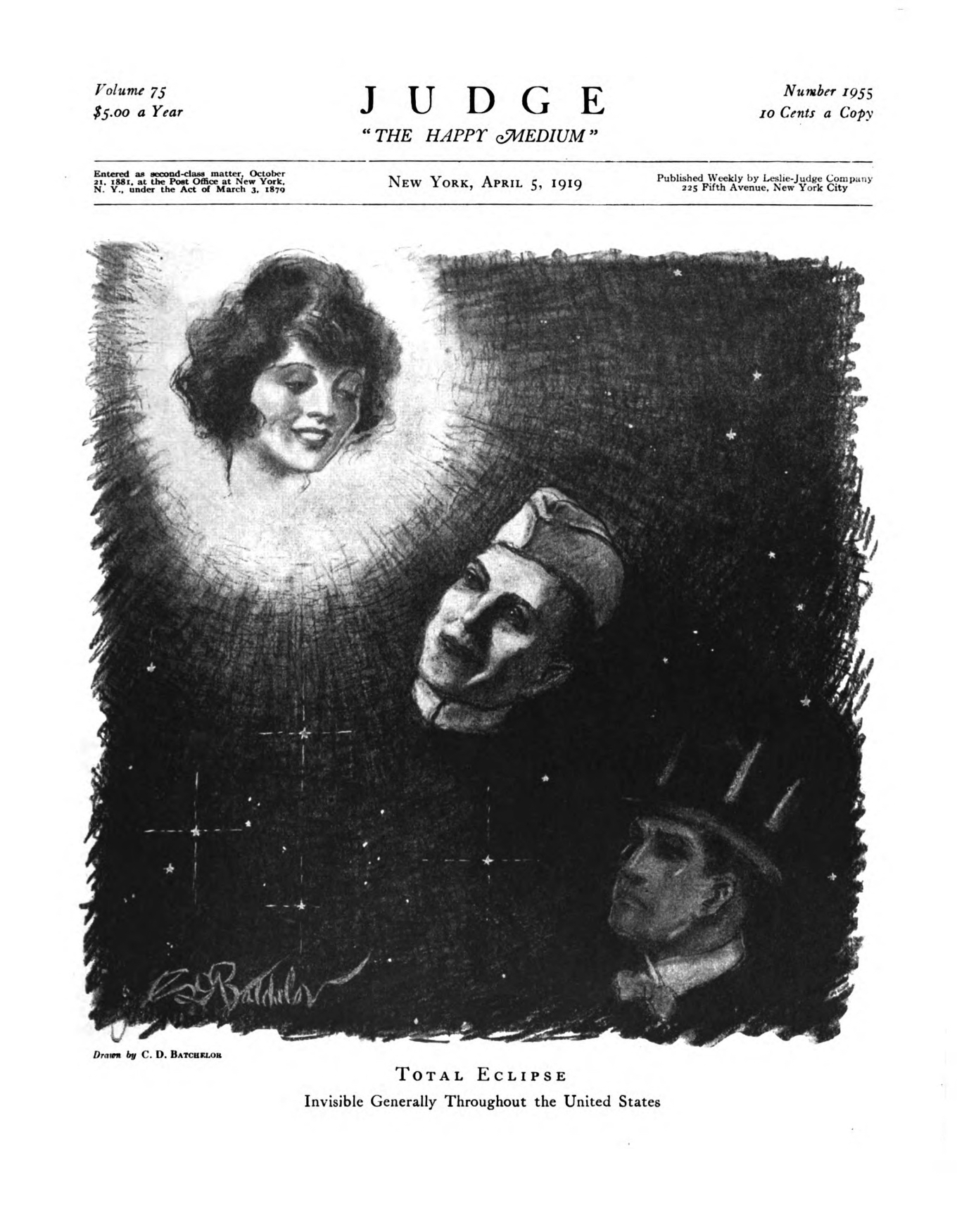
Judge cartoon, 5 Apr 1919

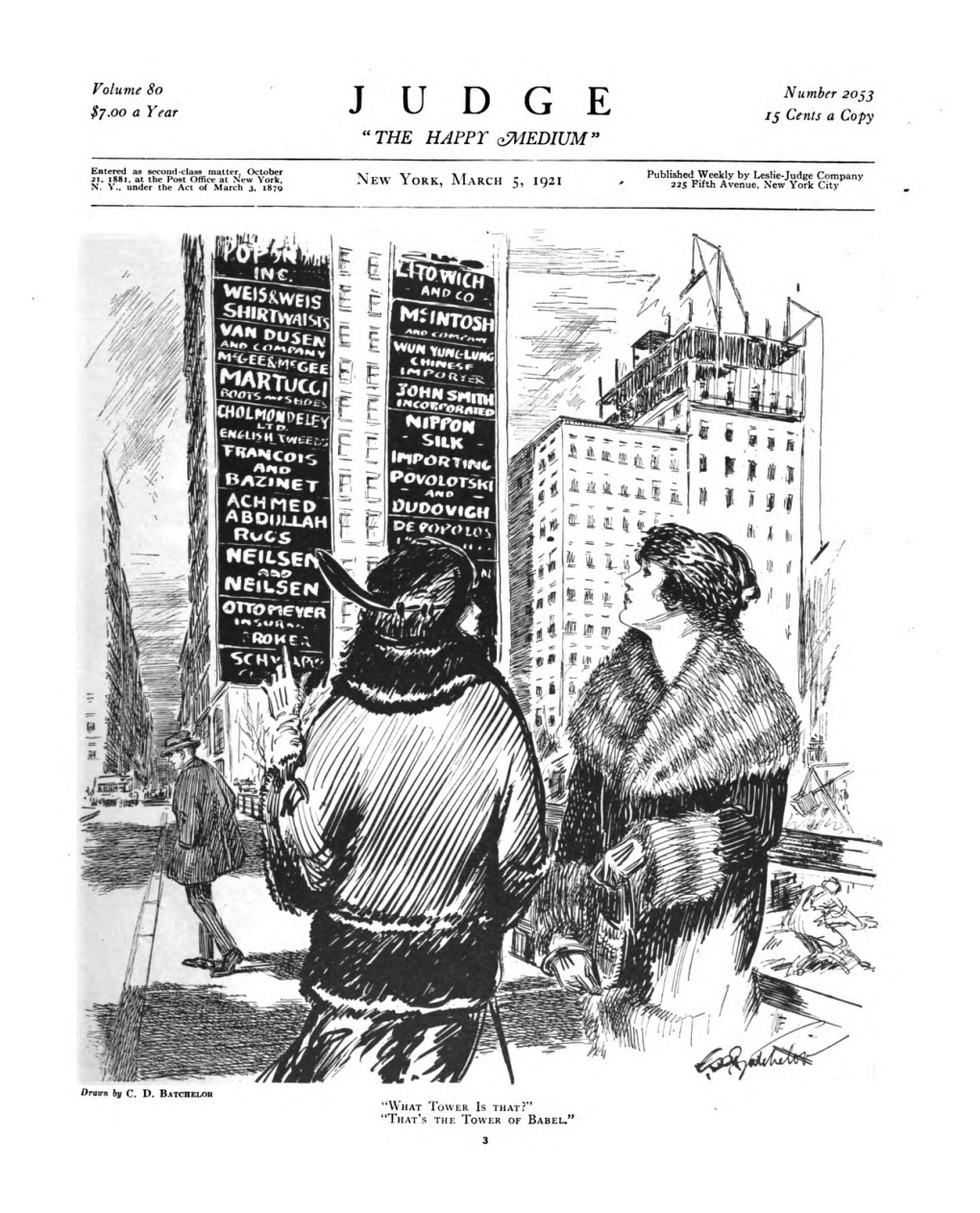
Judge cartoon, 5 Mar 1921
