= The War with Mexico =

1919 nonfiction book by Justin Harvey Smith

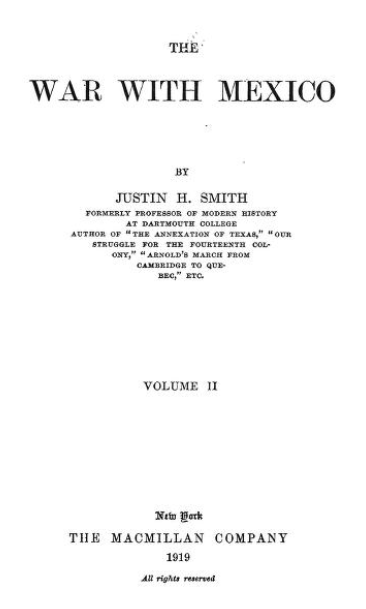
- Title page for The War with Mexico (1919)
- Author: Justin Harvey Smith
- Language: English
- Subject: Mexican-American War
- Genre: Non-fiction
- Publisher: Macmillan
- Publication date: 1919
- Publication place: United States

The War with Mexico is a 1919 nonfiction book by Justin Harvey Smith on the Mexican–American War. It won the 1920 Pulitzer Prize for History.
