= Lauren D. Lyman =

American reporter and aviation writer

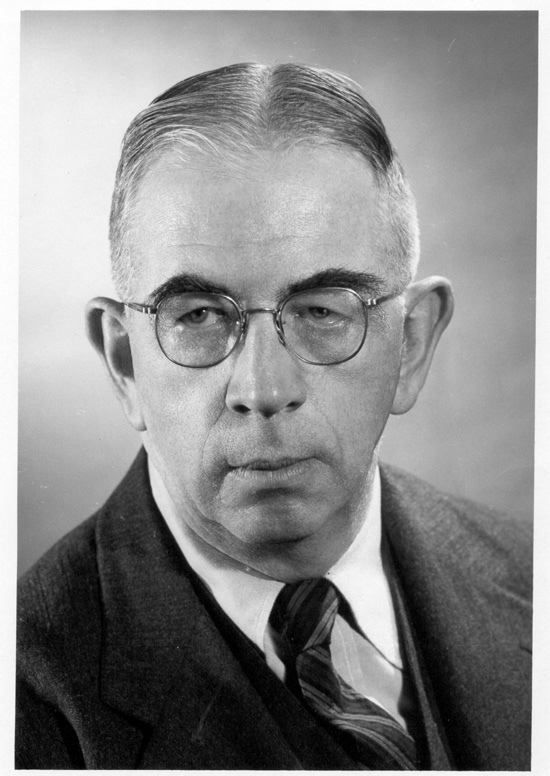

Lauren Dwight "Deac" Lyman (April 24, 1891 – July 12, 1972) was an American reporter and aviation writer. He worked for The New York Times from 1919 to 1937 and from 1937 to 1959 as a public relations executive for United Aircraft, a predecessor to United Technologies Corporation. He won a Pulitzer Prize in 1936 for "his exclusive story revealing that the Charles A. Lindbergh family was leaving the United States to live in England."

Born on a farm in Easthampton, Massachusetts, Lyman was known all his life by the nickname "Deac", which he inherited from his father and grandfather who were both New England church deacons. In 1917 he dropped out of Yale University to join the Army when the United States entered World War I. After two years of service in France, he was discharged in 1919 and joined The New York Times as an assistant real estate editor and general assignment reporter. In 1927 Lyman was named aviation editor and one of the first stories he covered was Charles Lindbergh's non-stop "New York to Paris" solo flight in May 1927; the two remained friends for 45 years, to Lyman's death in 1972. Late in December 1935, Lyman provided exclusive coverage of the Lindbergh family flight from the U.S., made in secret, to live in self-imposed exile. For that coup, he won the annual Pulitzer Prize for Reporting. In 1938 Lyman and Carl B. Allen co-wrote The Wonder Book of the Air (John C. Winston Co., 1939), a 340-page illustrated volume for children and young adults, covering all aspects of aviation.

Following his death in 1972, the former Aviation/Space Writers Association established the Lauren D. Lyman Award in his honor to be presented annually "for distinguished, career-long achievements in aviation journalism or public relations". The Award is now administered by the Aerospace Industries Association.
