= John Joseph O'Neill (journalist) =

John Joseph O'Neill (1889–1953), of the New York Herald Tribune, along with William L. Laurence of the New York Times. Howard Blakeslee of AP, Gobind Behari Lal of Universal Service and David Dietz of Scripps-Howard, won the 1937 Pulitzer Prize for Reporting "for their coverage of science at the tercentenary of Harvard University."

He was a self-taught journalist whose formal education did not go beyond public schooling. He is also the author of Prodigal genius; the life of Nikola Tesla (1944), which was published in 18 editions in German and English. and several other non-technical books on 20th century science. In 1953 he observed a feature on the Moon, on the western shore of Mare Crisium, which he interpreted as a giant natural bridge, but it turned out to be an illusion. Now this illusion is known as O'Neill's Bridge.

He died at his home in Freeport, New York on August 30, 1953.
