= William E. Vaughan =

- Born: October 8, 1915; St. Louis, Missouri, U.S.
- Died: February 25, 1977 (aged 61)
- Occupation: Columnist

William E. Vaughan (October 8, 1915 – February 25, 1977) was an American columnist and author. Born in Saint Louis, Missouri, he wrote a syndicated column for the Kansas City Star from 1946 until his death in 1977. He was published in Reader's Digest and Better Homes and Gardens under the pseudonym Burton Hillis. He attended Washington University in St. Louis.

He is known and still quoted decades later for his folksy aphorisms, some of which were published in his "Starbeams" feature. They have been collected in books and on Internet sites. Bill Vaughan died at age 61 of lung cancer.

== Aphorisms ==
Examples of his aphorisms which have been quoted long after his death include:

- "To Err is Human; To Really Foul Things Up Requires a Computer"
- "The best of all gifts around any Christmas tree: the presence of a family all wrapped up in each other."
- "Frankly, the feeling of the adult contingent in the second house from the corner is that, instead of taking down the Christmas decorations, it will be easier to move."
- "A real patriot is the fellow who gets a parking ticket and rejoices that the system works."

== Books ==
He wrote three books, Bird Thou Never Wert, a 1962 collection of columns, Sorry I Stirred It 1964, and Half the Battle 1967. Posthumous collections were published, columns in 1979, The Best of Bill Vaughan. and aphorisms in 1981, Starbeams.

== Sources ==
- Basic Famous People
- Kansas City Public Library
