= A. B. MacDonald =

American journalist

Alexander Black MacDonald (May 6, 1871 — April 9, 1942) was an American journalist for the Kansas City Star who won a Pulitzer Prize for Reporting in 1931 for "his work in connection with a murder in Amarillo, Texas." On that assignment, he "solved a murder mystery . . . and brought a guilty man to justice."

== Biography ==
Macdonald was born in New Brunswick, Canada, the son of Alexander Black Macdonald and Jemima McDonald. He later described his father:

- "The greatest man I ever knew ... was a preacher in a little Canadian village. He preached in three villages, riding on circuit, helping people. He did that for sixty years and died possessing a black broadcloth suit and $125. A great man and a great life."

Macdonald emigrated to the United States in 1890, and became naturalized as a citizen in 1896. He quickly established himself as reporter, working first for the Kansas City Times (1891-1893), then the Kansas City World (1893), and The Kansas City Star (1894-1920). He took a leave from newspaper reporting to serve on the staff of Country Gentleman and Ladies’ Home Journal (1920-1928), but returned to the Kansas City Star in 1928, and continued there until his death.

Earlier, he had been sent to Oklahoma to cover the chase of Henry Starr, "a bandit who rode safely through a surrounding posse because his sweetheart was on the horse with him and the possemen were too gallant to shoot."

After he was assigned to interview evangelist Billy Sunday, he took a leave from the Star to go to New York to work as Sunday's publicity agent.
