= Hell-Bent Fer Heaven =

1924 melodrama play by Hatcher Hughes

Hell-Bent fer Heaven
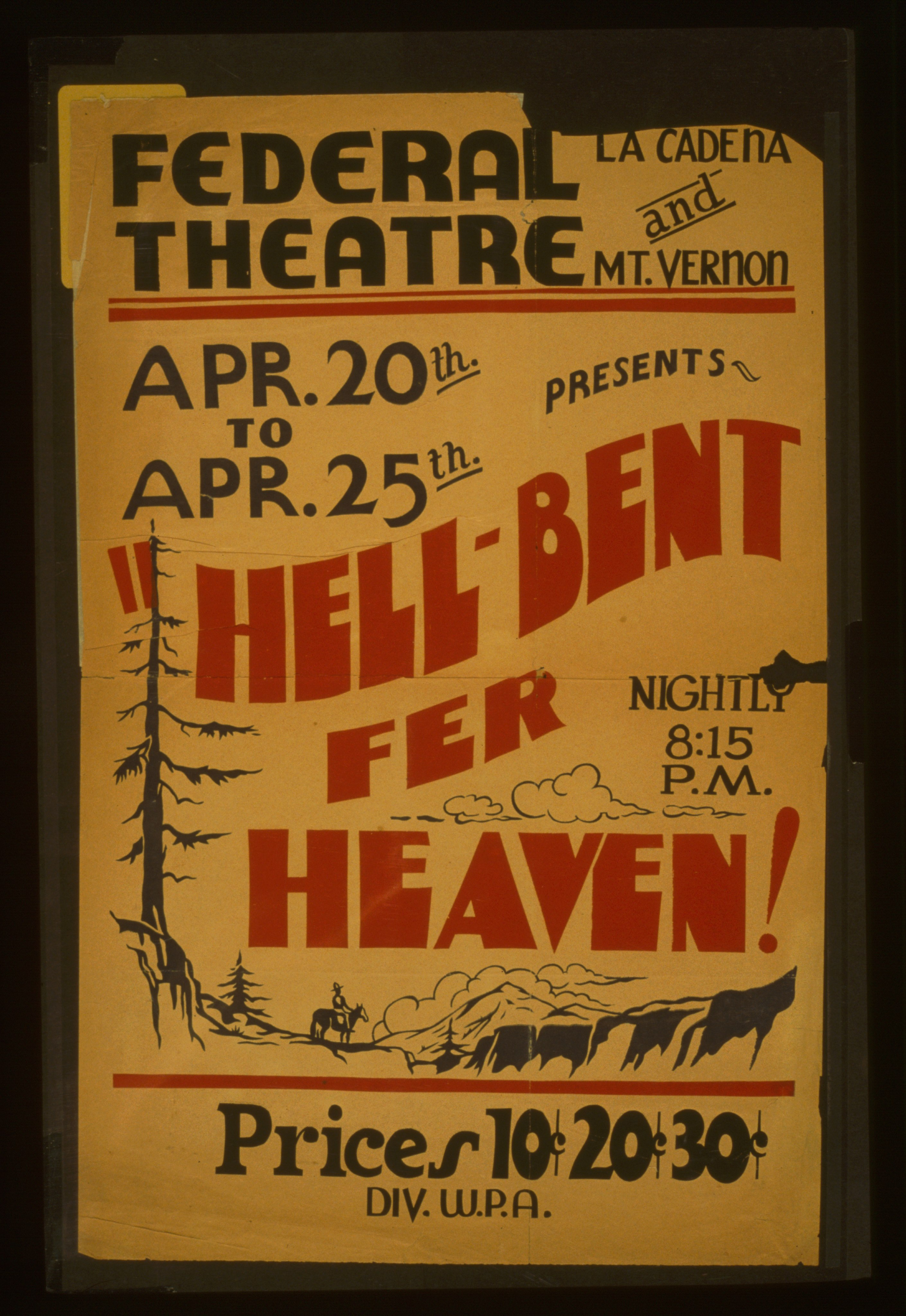
- Poster for 1936 production
- Written by: Hatcher Hughes
- Original language: English
- Genre: melodrama
- Setting: The Hunt family home in the Blue Ridge Mountains

Premiere
- Date premiered: January 4, 1924
- Place premiered: Klaw Theatre; New York City, New York

Hell-Bent fer Heaven is a melodrama play by Hatcher Hughes.

== Production ==
The play ran at the Klaw Theatre from January 4 to April 1924 and was produced by Marc Klaw. The cast featured George Abbott, Glenn Anders and Margaret Borough. The play was staged by Augustin Duncan.

It also helped launch the career of Clara Blandick, who later appeared as Auntie Em in the classic 1939 adaptation of The Wizard of Oz.

The play was included in Burns Mantle's The Best Plays of 1923-1924.

=== Pulitzer Prize ===
The play won the Pulitzer Prize for Drama in 1924. The choice sparked controversy in literary circles and the media because the prize jury had actually selected George Kelly's The Show-Off, but was overruled by Columbia University, which was administering that year's Pulitzers as Hatcher Hughes was a professor there.

== Plot ==
Set in the Carolina mountains, late one afternoon to 9 o'clock that evening during the summer. Rufe Pryor is a religious fanatic who works for the Hunts. Sid Hunt returns to the family home from the war. He has a girlfriend, Jude Lowry, who Rufe also is interested in. Rufe inspires old clan rivalry between the Hunts and the Lowrys, in an attempt to remove Sid from the picture. When Rufe's plans are discovered, the two families reconcile. (The play was billed as "A High Spirited Tale of the Blue Ridge.")

== Cast ==
- George Abbott as Sid Hunt
- Clara Blandick as Meg Hunt
- Augustin Duncan as David Hunt
- Burke Clarke as Matt Hunt
- Glenn Anders as Andy Lowry
- Margaret Borough as Jude Lowry
- John F. Hamilton as Rufe Pryor

== Film ==
The play was made into the motion picture Hell-Bent for Heaven in 1926.
