= John J. Leary Jr. =

American reporter and newspaper editor

John Joseph Leary Jr.
- Born: February 2, 1874
- Died: January 4, 1944 (aged 69)
- Resting place: Saint Mary's Cemetery, Lynn, Massachusetts
- Occupations: Reporter, Newspaper editor
- Spouse: Alice Ruth Dwyer
- Parent(s): John J. Leary, Mary Ann (Cronon)
- Awards: 1920 Pulitzer prize for reporting

John Joseph Leary Jr. (February 2, 1874 – January 4, 1944) was an American Pulitzer Prize-winning reporter and newspaper editor. He worked for a number of news organizations including Lynn Press, The Denver Times, the New York Herald, New York World, New-York Tribune, The Boston Journal, The Boston Post, and The Boston Record.

Leary's prize-winning work, written while working with the New York World, is still cited in books, more than 70-years after his death, with one author describing him as "the first star labor reporter in the United States. He worked with the World until they closed operations in 1931. Leary was also one of the more fortunate reporters, having the opportunity to interview Theodore Roosevelt; a book of his inverviews was published in 1920, titled "Talks with T.R."

== Career ==
=== Reporting with the New York World ===
Leary was working with the New York World, in 1920, when he was awarded the Pulitzer Prize for Reporting. He was awarded the prize for his series of articles written during the national coal strike during the winter of 1919. The reports covered labor issues and strikes during the West Virginia coal wars.

In his book, No Longer Newsworthy: How the Mainstream Media Abandoned the Working Class, Christopher R. Martin described Leary as "the first star labor reporter in the United States." Leary had begun covering the labor disputes, strikes and violence, between the United Mineworkers of America and the mine operators, beginning in 1918. His Pulitzer prize-winning stories were the first to be awarded the prize for labor reporting.

His story, "Coal Strike in West Virginia," (December 9, 1919, New York Herald) was reported on by various union labor journals all over the country, noting that he promised to continue reporting on the violence and efforts to stop unionization in Logan County, West Virginia.

The Buffalo Labor Journal ran one story headline, in December 1919, that read:

"Guyan Last Stand of Big Coal Kings, says "World" Writer. Only Law That of Mine Operators, John J. Leary Jr., Writes, Enforced "at Point of Pistol and Rifle" by Deputies Who Really Are "Servants" of the Operators, Who Pay the Sheriff a Lump Sum for Protection."

The journal article reported on "conditions that bordered on feudalism," to prevent future unionization in the Guyan River coal fields, in Guyan Valley, Huntington, West Virginia.

As the fight to allow unions to speak with non-union coal miners in West Virginia continued, the coal companies fought with injunctions against the union members. Leary described the filing of injunctions as showing "that, as usual with West Virginia decrees, they are sweeping...No gains in membership in the recently formed local unions in the Winding Gulf field have been made since the injunction order, cheerfully comments one West Virginia mine operator."

Leary continued reporting on the labor issues in West Virginia, writing, in 1922, about the inaction of then, Secretary of State, Herbert Hoover, and congress. In his article, "Coal-The Roosevelt Way Out," he wrote "'There is, " Secretary Hoover declared when the subject was put up to him, "no machinery for the purpose. We can only wait on developments."' He added that although President Harding had given much attention to the issue, "the attitude of official Washington reflects...the attitude of the man in the street...he knows that the situation is bad. But there have been situations as bad before and we have, some way or other, muddled through.'"

=== On Theodore Roosevelt ===
Leary's collection of conversations with Theodore Roosevelt, the 26th President of the United States, was published in a book titled, "Talks with T.R.," first published in 1920. Roosevelt died in January 1919, Leary was one of a very few number of people who had the opportunity to interview him in-depth.

=== Late career ===
Leary reported for The New York World until they closed operations in 1931. However, that didn't keep him out of the news.

Leary was a trusted reporter and his trips abroad were followed closely by the media. Upon his return from Europe, in 1931, during Great Depression, The New York Times reported on Leary's return with the headline reading, "LEARY, BACK, TELLS OF EUROPE'S PLIGHT," the story continued to read, "Depression Has Affected Us Least, He Reports After Survey for Labor Department. HAILS HOOVER'S PROGRAM: Former Newspaper Man Asserts It Averted Revolution in Germany and Austria."

== Personal and death ==
Leary was born to parents, John J. Leary and Mary Ann (Cronon). He married, Alice Ruth Dwyer (1876–1942), in 1896, she died, two years before his death, in 1942. Leary was buried, along with other family members, at Saint Mary's Cemetery, in Lynn, Massachusetts.
