= Pulitzer Prize for Drama =

American award for distinguished plays

The Pulitzer Prize for Drama is one of the seven American Pulitzer Prizes that are annually awarded for Letters, Drama, and Music. It is one of the original Pulitzers, for the program was inaugurated in 1917 with seven prizes, four of which were awarded that year. (No Drama prize was given, however, so that one was inaugurated in 1918, in a sense.) It recognizes a theatrical work staged in the U.S. during the preceding calendar year.

Joseph Pulitzer stipulated that the Pulitzer Prize for Drama should be awarded, "...Annually, for the original American play, performed in New York, which shall best represent the educational value and power of the stage in raising the standard of good morals, good taste, and good manners." The original prize was $1,000.

Until 2007, eligibility for the Drama Prize ran from March 1 to March 2 to reflect the Broadway "season" rather than the calendar year that governed most other Pulitzer Prizes.

The drama jury is composed of four members and a chair. Typically, these are three or four critics, complemented by academics or playwrights. The jury reviews scripts submitted by New York and regional theater productions, taking the production of the play into account. The jury makes recommendations to the Pulitzer board, which the board is not required to accept. This can result in the prize being awarded to another play, or in no prize being awarded.

== Rejections of the jury's recommendations ==
In 1924, the board's selection of Hell-Bent fer Heaven over the jury's recommendation of George Kelly's The Show-Off caused a minor scandal as the recipient of the award, Hatcher Hughes, taught at Columbia, which oversees the award. The jury resigned.

In 1955 Joseph Pulitzer, Jr. pressured the prize jury into presenting the Prize to Cat on a Hot Tin Roof, which the jury considered the weakest of the five shortlisted nominees ("amateurishly constructed... from the stylistic points of view annoyingly pretentious"), instead of Clifford Odets' The Flowering Peach or Maxwell Anderson's The Bad Seed.

Edward Albee's Who's Afraid of Virginia Woolf? was selected for the 1963 Pulitzer Prize for Drama by that year's jury. However, the jury was overruled by the award's advisory board, the trustees of Columbia University, because of the play's then-controversial use of profanity and sexual themes. The jurors, John Gassner and John Mason Brown, resigned, calling the decision "a farce."

In 1986, the jury's only recommendation was Robert Wilson's the CIVIL warS and the board declined to award a prize. Critic Dan Sullivan criticized both the board, for ignoring the jury of experts and refusing to acknowledge the avant-garde auteur Wilson, and the jury, for not selecting other plays as finalists, such as Aunt Dan and Lemon by Wallace Shawn or The Normal Heart by Larry Kramer.

== Awards and nominations ==
No award for said category was presented when the Prizes were first held in 1917.

The most recipients of the prize in one year was five, when Michael Bennett, James Kirkwood, Jr., Nicholas Dante, Marvin Hamlisch, and Edward Kleban shared the 1976 prize for the musical A Chorus Line.

=== Notes ===
† marks winners of the Tony Award for Best Play.
* marks winners of the Tony Award for Best Musical.
≠ marks nominees of the Tony Award for Best Play or the Tony Award for Best Musical.
‡ marks plays or musicals that have been staged at a Broadway theatre at least once.

=== 1910s ===
Year	Production	Author
1917
1917	no award	—N/a
1918
1918	Why Marry?‡	Jesse Lynch Williams
1919
1919	no award	—N/a

=== 1920s ===
Year	Production	Author
1920
1920	Beyond the Horizon‡ (Note: The 1920 jury noted their admiration for the ineligible Abraham Lincoln by John Drinkwater)	Eugene O'Neill
1921
1921	Miss Lulu Bett‡ (Note: The 1921 jury shortlisted The First Year by Frank Craven and Nemesis by Augustus Thomas.)	Zona Gale
1922
1922	Anna Christie‡	Eugene O'Neill
1923
1923	Icebound‡ (Note: The 1923 jury shortlisted Merton of the Movies by George S. Kaufman and Marc Connelly.)	Owen Davis
1924
1924	Hell-Bent fer Heaven‡ (Note: The 1924 jury unanimously recommended The Show-Off by George Kelly. The Advisory Board bypassed their suggestion for Hell-Bent Fer Heaven by Hatcher Hughes.)	Hatcher Hughes
1925
1925	They Knew What They Wanted‡ (Note: The 1925 jury shortlisted What Price Glory? by Maxwell Anderson and Laurence Stallings.)	Sidney Howard
1926
1926	Craig's Wife‡ (Note: The 1926 jury shortlisted In a Garden by Philip Barry, A Man's Man by Patrick Kearney and The Wisdom Tooth by Marc Connelly.)	George Kelly
1927
1927	In Abraham's Bosom	Paul Green
1928
1928	Strange Interlude‡ (Note: The 1928 jury shortlisted Behold the Bridegroom by George Kelly, Coquette by Ann Preston Bridgers and George Abbott, Four Walls by George Abbott and Dana Burnet, Paris Bound by Philip Barry, The Racket by Bartlett Cormack, The Royal Family by George S. Kaufman and Edna Ferber, and The Trial of Mary Dugan by Bayard Veiller.)	Eugene O'Neill
1929
1929	Street Scene‡	Elmer Rice

=== 1930s ===
Year	Production	Author
1930
1930	The Green Pastures‡	Marc Connelly
1931
1931	Alison's House‡	Susan Glaspell
1932
1932	Of Thee I Sing‡ (Note: The 1932 jury shortlisted, in order of preference, Mourning Becomes Electra by Eugene O'Neill, The Animal Kingdom by Philip Barry, The House of Connelly by Paul Green and The Left Bank by Elmer Rice.)	George S. Kaufman, Morrie Ryskind and Ira Gershwin
1933
1933	Both Your Houses‡ (Note: The 1933 jury shortlisted Another Language by Rose Franken and When Ladies Meet by Rachel Crothers.)	Maxwell Anderson
1934
1934	Men in White‡ (Note: The 1934 jury unanimously recommended Mary of Scotland by Maxwell Anderson. They also shortlisted Ah, Wilderness! by Eugene O'Neill, eventual winner Men in White by Sidney Kingsley, Peace on Earth by George Sklar and Albert Maltz, They Shall Not Die by John Wexley, Wednesday's Child by Leopold L. Atlas and Yellow Jack by Sidney Howard.)	Sidney Kingsley
1935
1935	The Old Maid‡ (Note: The 1935 jury shortlisted, in order of preference, Personal Appearance by Lawrence Riley, Merrily We Roll Along by George S. Kaufman and Moss Hart, and Valley Forge by Maxwell Anderson.)	Zoë Akins
1936
1936	Idiot's Delight‡ (Note: The 1936 jury chose End of Summer by S. N. Behrman as runner-up.)	Robert E. Sherwood
1937
1937	You Can't Take It with You‡ (Note: The 1937 jury shortlisted High Tor by Maxwell Anderson, Marching Song by John Howard Lawson and Rising Tide by George Brewer, Jr.)	Moss Hart and George S. Kaufman
1938
1938	Our Town‡	Thornton Wilder
1939
1939	Abe Lincoln in Illinois‡ (Note: The 1939 jury shortlisted Family Portrait by Lenore Coffee and William J. Cowen.)	Robert E. Sherwood

=== 1940s ===
Year	Production	Author
1940
1940	The Time of Your Life‡ (Note: The 1940 jury shortlisted Key Largo by Maxwell Anderson, Life with Father by Howard Lindsay and Russel Crouse, The Male Animal by James Thurber and Elliott Nugent, The Man Who Came to Dinner by George S. Kaufman and Moss Hart, Night Music by Clifford Odets and Two on an Island by Elmer Rice.)	William Saroyan
1941
1941	There Shall Be No Night‡ (Note: The 1941 jury shortlisted Arsenic and Old Lace by Joseph Kesselring, Claudia by Rose Franken, Johnny Belinda by Elmer Blaney Harris, Native Son by Paul Green and Richard Wright, The Talley Method by S. N. Behrman and Watch on the Rhine by Lillian Hellman.)	Robert E. Sherwood
1942
1942	no award (Note: The 1942 jury discussed Cafe Crown by H. S. Kraft and The Moon Is Down by John Steinbeck, but unanimously recommended that the Pulitzer board give no award.)	—N/a
1943
1943	The Skin of Our Teeth‡ (Note: The 1943 jury shortlisted The Eve of St. Mark by Maxwell Anderson, Harriet by Florence Ryerson and The Patriots by Sidney Kingsley.)	Thornton Wilder
1944
1944	no award (Note: Two members of the 1944 jury recommended The Voice of the Turtle by John Van Druten, whose eligibility was in question because he was a British national in the process of applying for American citizenship. The Pulitzer board independently presented Richard Rodgers and Oscar Hammerstein II with a Special Award and Citation for the musical Oklahoma!)	—N/a
1945
1945	Harvey‡ (Note: The 1945 jury shortlisted Dark of the Moon by Howard Richardson and William Berney.)	Mary Coyle Chase
1946
1946	State of the Union‡	Russel Crouse and Howard Lindsay
1947
1947	no award (Note: The 1947 jury was not unanimous, but multiple jurors each shortlisted All My Sons by Arthur Miller, Christopher Blake by Moss Hart, The Fatal Weakness by George Kelly and The Iceman Cometh by Eugene O'Neill.)	—N/a
1948
1948	A Streetcar Named Desire‡ (Note: The 1948 jury shortlisted Command Decision by William Wister Haines and Mister Roberts by Thomas Heggen and Joshua Logan.)	Tennessee Williams
1949
1949	Death of a Salesman†‡ (Note: The 1949 jury shortlisted Anne of the Thousand Days by Maxwell Anderson and Summer and Smoke by Tennessee Williams.)	Arthur Miller

=== 1950s ===
Year	Production	Author
1950
1950	South Pacific*‡ (Note: The 1950 jury recommended The Consul by Gian Carlo Menotti, an opera that had been chosen by the jury for the Pulitzer Prize for Music, which it won. The jury shortlisted The Member of the Wedding by Carson McCullers. They also considered The Cocktail Party by T. S. Eliot, but Eliot had renounced his American citizenship. The Advisory Board made their own choice: South Pacific by Richard Rodgers, Oscar Hammerstein II and Joshua Logan.)	Richard Rodgers, Oscar Hammerstein II and Joshua Logan
1951
1951	no award (Note: The 1951 jury shortlisted, in order, Billy Budd by Louis O. Coxe and Robert Chapman, Darkness at Noon by Sidney Kingsley and Second Threshold by Philip Barry and Robert E. Sherwood. The Pulitzer board decided to give no award.)	—N/a
1952
1952	The Shrike‡ (Note: The 1952 jury shortlisted, in order, Point of No Return by Paul Osborn and One Bright Day by Sigmund Miller.)	Joseph Kramm
1953
1953	Picnic‡ (Note: The 1953 jury shortlisted The Crucible by Arthur Miller and The Time of the Cuckoo by Arthur Laurents.)	William Inge
1954
1954	The Teahouse of the August Moon†‡ (Note: The 1954 jury considered The Caine Mutiny Court-Martial by Herman Wouk, but noted they "cannot in all conscience recommend" it for the prize because it was an adaptation of Wouk's novel The Caine Mutiny, for which he had already won the Pulitzer Prize for Fiction. They also shortlisted Tea and Sympathy by Robert Anderson and gave honorable mention to In the Summer House by Jane Bowles.)	John Patrick
1955
1955	Cat on a Hot Tin Roof≠‡ (Note: The 1955 jury shortlisted, in order, The Bad Seed by Maxwell Anderson, The Flowering Peach by Clifford Odets, The Desperate Hours by Joseph Hayes, Bus Stop by William Inge and Cat on a Hot Tin Roof by Tennessee Williams. The jury gave extremely faint praise to Cat on a Hot Tin Roof, calling it "amateurishly constructed," but the Pulitzer board awarded it the prize based on the recommendation of chairman Joseph Pulitzer Jr.)	Tennessee Williams
1956
1956	The Diary of Anne Frank†‡ (Note: The 1956 jury shortlisted Inherit the Wind by Jerome Lawrence and Robert E. Lee, and Time Limit! by Henry Denker and Ralph Berkey.)	Albert Hackett and Frances Goodrich
1957
1957	Long Day's Journey into Night†‡ (Note: The 1957 jury shortlisted Orpheus Descending by Tennessee Williams and Visit to a Small Planet by Gore Vidal.)	Eugene O'Neill
1958
1958	Look Homeward, Angel≠‡ (Note: The 1958 jury shortlisted The Dark at the Top of the Stairs by William Inge and Sunrise at Campobello by Dore Schary.)	Ketti Frings
1959
1959	J.B.†‡ (Note: The 1959 jury gave honorable mention to A Raisin in the Sun by Lorraine Hansberry.)	Archibald MacLeish

=== 1960s ===
Year	Production	Author
1960
1960	Fiorello!*‡ (Note: The 1960 jury recommended Toys in the Attic by Lillian Hellman. The Pulitzer board awarded the prize to Fiorello! by Jerome Weidman, George Abbott, Jerry Bock and Sheldon Harnick, a musical which had not even been mentioned in the jury's report.)	Jerome Weidman, George Abbott, Jerry Bock and Sheldon Harnick
1961
1961	All the Way Home≠‡	Tad Mosel
1962
1962	How to Succeed in Business without Really Trying*‡ (Note: The 1962 jury shortlisted Gideon by Paddy Chayefsky, The Night of the Iguana by Tennessee Williams and Purlie Victorious by Ossie Davis.)	Frank Loesser and Abe Burrows
1963
1963	no award (Note: The 1963 jury recommended Who's Afraid of Virginia Woolf? by Edward Albee, but the Pulitzer board, who have sole discretion in awarding the prize, rejected the recommendation, due to the play's perceived vulgarity, and no award was given instead.)	—N/a
1964
1964	no award	—N/a
1965
1965	The Subject Was Roses†‡	Frank D. Gilroy
1966
1966	no award	—N/a
1967
1967	A Delicate Balance≠‡	Edward Albee
1968
1968	no award	—N/a
1969
1969	The Great White Hope†‡ (Note: The 1969 jury shortlisted 1776 by Sherman Edwards and Peter Stone, The Boys in the Band by Mart Crowley and Ceremonies in Dark Old Men by Lonne Elder III.)	Howard Sackler

=== 1970s ===
Year	Production	Author
1970
1970	No Place to Be Somebody‡ (Note: Though the 1970 jury was unanimous in recommending No Place to Be Somebody by Charles Gordone for the prize, juror Richard Watts Jr. also asked for consideration of Child's Play by Robert Marasco and Last of the Red Hot Lovers by Neil Simon.)	Charles Gordone
1971
1971	The Effect of Gamma Rays on Man-in-the-Moon Marigolds‡ (Note: The 1971 jury also considered Les Blancs by Lorraine Hansberry and The House of Blue Leaves by John Guare.)	Paul Zindel
1972
1972	no award (Note: The 1972 jury recommended no award be given, but mentioned in their report that they had considered Follies by Stephen Sondheim and James Goldman, Moonchildren by Michael Weller, Sticks and Bones by David Rabe and Twigs by George Furth as possibilities.)	—N/a
1973
1973	That Championship Season†‡ (Note: The 1973 jury shortlisted The River Niger by Joseph A. Walker.)	Jason Miller
1974
1974	no award (Note: The 1974 jury stated they could not "wholeheartedly recommend" any play for the Pulitzer, but included a shortlist of plays "worthy of some serious consideration." These were, in order, Short Eyes by Miguel Piñero, What the Wine‐Sellers Buy by Ron Milner, The Great MacDaddy by Paul Carter Harrison, The Life and Times of Joseph Stalin by Robert Wilson, Bad Habits by Terrence McNally and Baba Goya (Nourish the Beast) by Steve Tesich.)	—N/a
1975
1975	Seascape≠‡	Edward Albee
1976
1976	A Chorus Line*‡ (Note: The 1976 jury shortlisted The First Breeze of Summer by Leslie Lee and Streamers by David Rabe.)	Michael Bennett, Nicholas Dante, James Kirkwood, Jr., Marvin Hamlisch and Edward Kleban
1977
1977	The Shadow Box†‡ (Note: The 1977 jury unanimously recommended The Shadow Box by Michael Cristofer for the prize. However, juror Richard L. Coe also commended A Texas Trilogy by Preston Jones, while juror Brendan Gill favored The Runner Stumbles by Milan Stitt.)	Michael Cristofer
1978
1978	The Gin Game≠‡ (Note: The 1978 jury unanimously recommended The Gin Game by Donald L. Coburn for the prize. They also considered the following plays by "new young writers," but noted "that any award in this group would be premature": Curse of the Starving Class by Sam Shepard, Feedlot by Patrick Meyers, Landscape of the Body by John Guare, A Life in the Theatre and The Water Engine by David Mamet, A Prayer for My Daughter by Thomas Babe and Uncommon Women and Others by Wendy Wasserstein.)	Donald L. Coburn
1979
1979	Buried Child‡	Sam Shepard

=== 1980s ===
Year	Production	Author
1980
1980	Talley's Folly≠‡	Lanford Wilson
1981
1981	Crimes of the Heart≠‡	Beth Henley
1982
1982	A Soldier's Play‡	Charles Fuller
1983
1983	'night, Mother≠‡	Marsha Norman
1983	True West‡	Sam Shepard
1984
1984	Glengarry Glen Ross≠‡	David Mamet
1984	Fool for Love‡	Sam Shepard
1984	Painting Churches	Tina Howe
1985
1985	Sunday in the Park with George≠‡	James Lapine and Stephen Sondheim
1985	The Dining Room	A. R. Gurney
1985	The Gospel at Colonus‡	Lee Breuer and Bob Telson
1986
1986	no award (Note: The Nominating Jury acknowledged their first choice, The Civil Wars, was unconventional and "not a play in any traditional sense of the word". The only other option the jury offered was Hannah and Her Sisters by Woody Allen, which they realized was not a traditional nominee for a drama award, due to it being a film, but thought they would "raise the question of... eligibility" anyway. Fischer, Heinz-Dietrich (2008). Chronicle of the Pulitzer Prizes for Drama: Discussions, Decisions and Documents. Boston: K. G. Saur. p. 374. ISBN 9786611995324.)	—N/a
1986	the CIVIL warS: a tree is best measured when it is down	Robert Wilson
1987
1987	Fences†‡	August Wilson
1987	Broadway Bound≠‡	Neil Simon
1987	A Walk in the Woods‡	Lee Blessing
1988
1988	Driving Miss Daisy‡	Alfred Uhry
1988	Boys' Life	Howard Korder
1988	Talk Radio‡	Eric Bogosian
1989
1989	The Heidi Chronicles†‡	Wendy Wasserstein
1989	The Piano Lesson≠‡	August Wilson
1989	M. Butterfly†‡	David Henry Hwang

=== 1990s ===
Year	Production	Author
1990
1990	The Piano Lesson≠‡	August Wilson
1990	And What of the Night?	María Irene Fornés
1990	Love Letters‡	A. R. Gurney
1991
1991	Lost in Yonkers†≠‡	Neil Simon
1991	Prelude to a Kiss≠‡	Craig Lucas
1991	Six Degrees of Separation≠‡	John Guare
1992
1992	The Kentucky Cycle≠‡	Robert Schenkkan
1992	Conversations with My Father‡	Herb Gardner
1992	Miss Evers' Boys	David Feldshuh
1992	Two Trains Running≠‡	August Wilson
1992	Sight Unseen‡	Donald Margulies
1993
1993	Angels in America: Millennium Approaches†‡	Tony Kushner
1993	The Destiny of Me	Larry Kramer
1993	Fires in the Mirror	Anna Deavere Smith
1994
1994	Three Tall Women‡	Edward Albee
1994	Keely and Du	Jane Martin
1994	A Perfect Ganesh	Terrence McNally
1995
1995	The Young Man from Atlanta‡	Horton Foote
1995	The Cryptogram	David Mamet
1995	Seven Guitars≠‡	August Wilson
1996
1996	Rent*‡	Jonathan Larson
1996	A Fair Country	Jon Robin Baitz
1996	Old Wicked Songs	Jon Marans
1997
1997	no award	—N/a
1997	Collected Stories‡	Donald Margulies
1997	The Last Night of Ballyhoo†‡	Alfred Uhry
1997	Pride's Crossing	Tina Howe
1998
1998	How I Learned to Drive‡	Paula Vogel
1998	Freedomland	Amy Freed
1998	Three Days of Rain‡	Richard Greenberg
1999
1999	Wit‡	Margaret Edson
1999	Running Man	Cornelius Eady and Diedre Murray
1999	Side Man†‡	Warren Leight

=== 2000s ===
Year	Production	Author
2000
2000	Dinner with Friends	Donald Margulies
2000	In the Blood	Suzan-Lori Parks
2000	King Hedley II≠‡	August Wilson
2001
2001	Proof†‡	David Auburn
2001	The Play about the Baby	Edward Albee
2001	The Waverly Gallery‡	Kenneth Lonergan
2002
2002	Topdog/Underdog≠‡	Suzan-Lori Parks
2002	The Glory of Living	Rebecca Gilman
2002	Yellowman	Dael Orlandersmith
2003
2003	Anna in the Tropics≠‡	Nilo Cruz
2003	The Goat, or Who Is Sylvia?†‡	Edward Albee
2003	Take Me Out†‡	Richard Greenberg
2004
2004	I Am My Own Wife†‡	Doug Wright
2004	Man from Nebraska	Tracy Letts
2004	Omnium Gatherum	Theresa Rebeck and Alexandra Gersten-Vassilaros
2005
2005	Doubt: A Parable†‡	John Patrick Shanley
2005	The Clean House	Sarah Ruhl
2005	Thom Pain (based on nothing)	Will Eno
2006
2006	no award	—N/a
2006	Miss Witherspoon	Christopher Durang
2006	The Intelligent Design of Jenny Chow	Rolin Jones
2006	Red Light Winter	Adam Rapp
2007
2007	Rabbit Hole≠‡	David Lindsay-Abaire
2007	Bulrusher	Eisa Davis
2007	Orpheus X	Rinde Eckert
2007	Elliot, a Soldier's Fugue	Quiara Alegría Hudes
2008
2008	August: Osage County†‡	Tracy Letts
2008	Dying City	Christopher Shinn
2008	Yellow Face‡	David Henry Hwang
2009
2009	Ruined	Lynn Nottage
2009	Becky Shaw‡	Gina Gionfriddo
2009	In the Heights*‡	Lin-Manuel Miranda and Quiara Alegría Hudes

=== 2010s ===
Year	Production	Author
2010
2010	Next to Normal≠‡	Tom Kitt and Brian Yorkey
2010	Bengal Tiger at the Baghdad Zoo‡	Rajiv Joseph
2010	The Elaborate Entrance of Chad Deity	Kristoffer Diaz
2010	In the Next Room (or The Vibrator Play)≠‡	Sarah Ruhl
2011
2011	Clybourne Park†‡	Bruce Norris
2011	Detroit	Lisa D'Amour
2011	A Free Man of Color‡	John Guare
2012
2012	Water by the Spoonful	Quiara Alegría Hudes
2012	Other Desert Cities≠‡	Jon Robin Baitz
2012	Sons of the Prophet	Stephen Karam
2013
2013	Disgraced≠‡	Ayad Akhtar
2013	Rapture, Blister, Burn	Gina Gionfriddo
2013	4000 Miles	Amy Herzog
2014
2014	The Flick	Annie Baker
2014	The (Curious Case of the) Watson Intelligence	Madeleine George
2014	Fun Home*‡	Jeanine Tesori and Lisa Kron
2015
2015	Between Riverside and Crazy≠‡	Stephen Adly Guirgis
2015	Marjorie Prime ‡	Jordan Harrison
2015	Father Comes Home From the Wars (Parts 1, 2, & 3)	Suzan-Lori Parks
2016
2016	Hamilton*‡	Lin-Manuel Miranda
2016	The Humans†‡	Stephen Karam
2016	Gloria‡	Branden Jacobs-Jenkins
2017
2017	Sweat≠‡	Lynn Nottage
2017	A 24-Decade History of Popular Music	Taylor Mac
2017	The Wolves	Sarah DeLappe
2018
2018	Cost of Living≠‡	Martyna Majok
2018	Everybody	Branden Jacobs-Jenkins
2018	The Minutes≠‡	Tracy Letts
2019
2019	Fairview	Jackie Sibblies Drury
2019	Dance Nation	Clare Barron
2019	What the Constitution Means to Me≠‡	Heidi Schreck

=== 2020s ===
Year	Production	Author	Ref
2020
2020	A Strange Loop*‡	Michael R. Jackson	
2020	Heroes of the Fourth Turning	Will Arbery	
2020	Soft Power	David Henry Hwang and Jeanine Tesori	
2021
2021	The Hot Wing King	Katori Hall	
2021	Circle Jerk	Michael Breslin and Patrick Foley	
2021	Stew	Zora Howard	
2022
2022	Fat Ham≠‡	James Ijames	
2022	Kristina Wong, Sweatshop Overlord	Kristina Wong	
2022	Selling Kabul	Sylvia Khoury	
2023
2023	English≠‡	Sanaz Toossi	
2023	The Far Country	Lloyd Suh	
2023	On Sugarland	Aleshea Harris	
2024
2024	Primary Trust	Eboni Booth	
2024	Here There Are Blueberries‡	Amanda Gronich and Moises Kaufman	
2024	Public Obscenities	Shayok Misha Chowdhury	
2025
2025	Purpose†‡	Branden Jacobs-Jenkins	
2025	The Ally	Itamar Moses	
2025	Oh, Mary!≠‡	Cole Escola	
2026
2026	Liberation†‡	Bess Wohl	
2026	Bowl EP	Nazareth Hassan	
2026	Meet the Cartozians	Talene Monahon	

== Musicals ==
Ten musicals have won the Pulitzer Prize for Drama, roughly one per decade from the 1930s to the 2020s¹. They are: George and Ira Gershwin's Of Thee I Sing (1932), Rodgers and Hammerstein's South Pacific (1950), Bock & Harnick's Fiorello! (1960), Frank Loesser's How to Succeed in Business Without Really Trying (1962), Marvin Hamlisch, Edward Kleban, James Kirkwood, Jr., and Nicholas Dante's A Chorus Line (1976), Stephen Sondheim's and James Lapine's Sunday in the Park with George (1985), Jonathan Larson's Rent (1996), Brian Yorkey and Tom Kitt's Next to Normal (2010), Lin-Manuel Miranda's Hamilton (2016), and Michael R. Jackson's A Strange Loop (2020). Though it did not win for Drama, Oklahoma! was awarded a special Pulitzer Prize in 1944.

Of note, South Pacific won the 1950 Pulitzer for Drama but its source material, James Michener's Tales of the South Pacific, also won the 1948 Pulitzer Prize for Fiction. Similarly, non-musical All the Way Home by Tad Mosel won the 1961 Pulitzer and was based on James Agee's 1957 Pulitzer winning novel A Death in the Family.

Sunday in the Park with George and Next to Normal are the only musicals that won the Pulitzer Prize and did not also win the Tony Award for Best Musical; the latter won the authors Tonys for Best Original Score and Best Orchestrations. Of Thee I Sing opened before the Tony Awards existed.

The award goes to the playwright, although production of the play is also taken into account. In the case of a musical being awarded the prize, the composer, lyricist and book writer are generally the recipients. An exception to this was the first Pulitzer ever awarded to a musical: when Of Thee I Sing won in 1932, book authors George S. Kaufman and Morrie Ryskind, as well as lyricist Ira Gershwin, were cited as the winners, while composer George Gershwin's contribution was overlooked by the committee. The reason given was that the Pulitzer Prize for Drama is a dramatic award, and not a musical one. However, by 1950 the Pulitzer committee included composer Richard Rodgers as a recipient when South Pacific won the award, in recognition of music as an integral and important part of the theatrical experience.

Additionally, since 1983, when the identity of finalists was first disclosed, six musicals have been finalists for the Pulitzer Prize for Drama. They are: Lee Breuer and Bob Telson's The Gospel at Colonus (1985); Rinde Eckert's Orpheus X (2007), Lin-Manuel Miranda and Quiara Alegría Hudes' In the Heights (2009); Jeanine Tesori and Lisa Kron's Fun Home (2014); Taylor Mac's A 24-Decade History of Popular Music (2017); and David Henry Hwang and Jeanine Tesori's Soft Power (2020). Additionally, Robert Wilson's opera The Civil Wars: A Tree Is Best Measured When It Is Down was a finalist in 1986.

_{¹All listed dates are Prize years. Generally, the musical in question opened in New York during either the preceding calendar year or the preceding Broadway season.}

== Multiple wins and nominations ==
The following individuals received two or more Pulitzer Prizes for Drama:

Wins	Playwright	Nominations
4	Eugene O'Neill	4
3	Edward Albee	5
3	Robert E. Sherwood	3
2	August Wilson	6
2	George S. Kaufman	2
2	Lynn Nottage	2
2	Thornton Wilder	2
2	Tennessee Williams	2

The following individuals received two or more nominations:

Nominations	Playwright
6	August Wilson
5	Edward Albee
4	Eugene O'Neill
3	Quiara Alegría Hudes
3	David Henry Hwang
3	Branden Jacobs-Jenkins
3	Tracy Letts
3	Donald Margulies
3	Suzan-Lori Parks
3	Robert E. Sherwood
3	Sam Shepard
2	Jon Robin Baitz
2	Gina Gionfriddo
2	John Guare
2	A.R. Gurney
2	Richard Greenberg
2	Tina Howe
2	Stephen Karam
2	George S. Kaufman
2	David Mamet
2	Lin-Manuel Miranda
2	Lynn Nottage
2	Sarah Ruhl
2	Neil Simon
2	Jeanine Tesori
2	Alfred Uhry
2	Thornton Wilder
2	Tennessee Williams

Lynn Nottage is the only female playwright to win the prize twice. She and August Wilson are the only playwrights of color to accomplish this feat.

Jon Robin Baitz, Gina Gionfriddo, John Guare, A.R. Gurney, Richard Greenberg, Tina Howe, Stephen Karam, Sarah Ruhl and Jeanine Tesori have each been named finalists twice without winning. David Henry Hwang is the only person to have been named a finalist thrice without winning. Lin-Manuel Miranda and Jeanine Tesori are the only people to be named as a finalist twice for writing/composing a musical, with Miranda winning in 2016.
