= John F. Knott =

Austro-Hungarian and American cartoonist

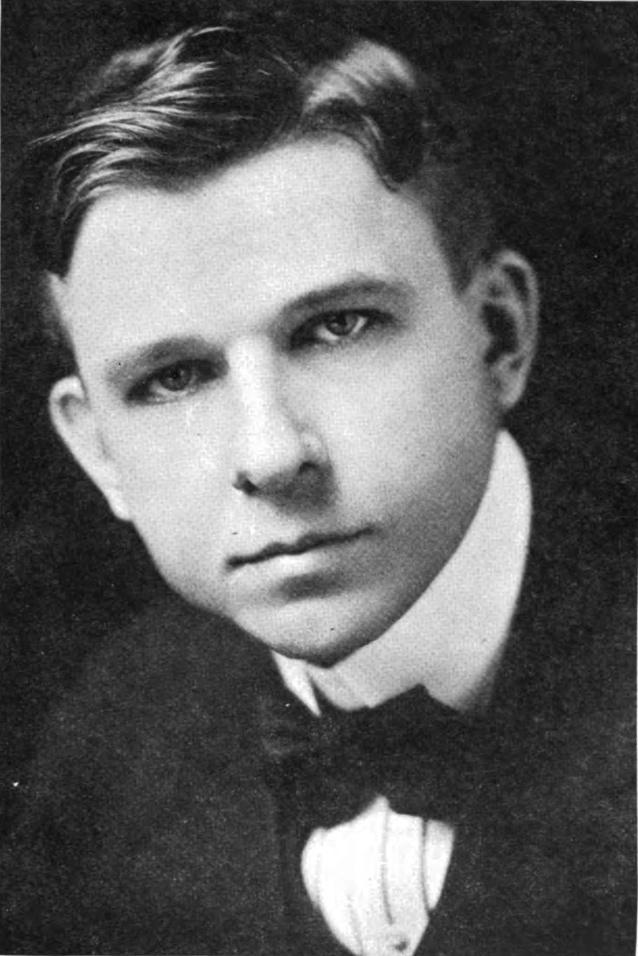
- Born: December 7, 1878; Plzeň, Austria-Hungary
- Died: February 16, 1963 (aged 84)
- Known for: Cartooning

John Francis Knott (December 7, 1878 – February 16, 1963) was an Austro-Hungarian and American cartoonist. He was born in Plzeň, Austria-Hungary, and emigrated to Sioux City, Iowa with his widowed mother at the age of five.

Knott started working at The Dallas Morning News in 1905. He drew daily cartoons in the paper during Woodrow Wilson's first presidential campaign and World War I. His works used to be marked with his distinct, signature style of incisive humor through simple and effective portrayal of Texan life. Knott's most famous cartoon character "Old Man Texas" was a champion for government honesty, low taxes, and property ownership. It is believed his cartoons supporting American entry into World War I helped increase the sales of Liberty Bonds and donations towards the war effort.

Knott's cartoons were reprinted in several publications including The Literary Digest, Review of Reviews, The Wall Street Journal, Los Angeles Times, New York Evening Post, the New York Herald Tribune, the St. Louis Post-Dispatch, and the Philadelphia Public Ledger.

== Personal information ==
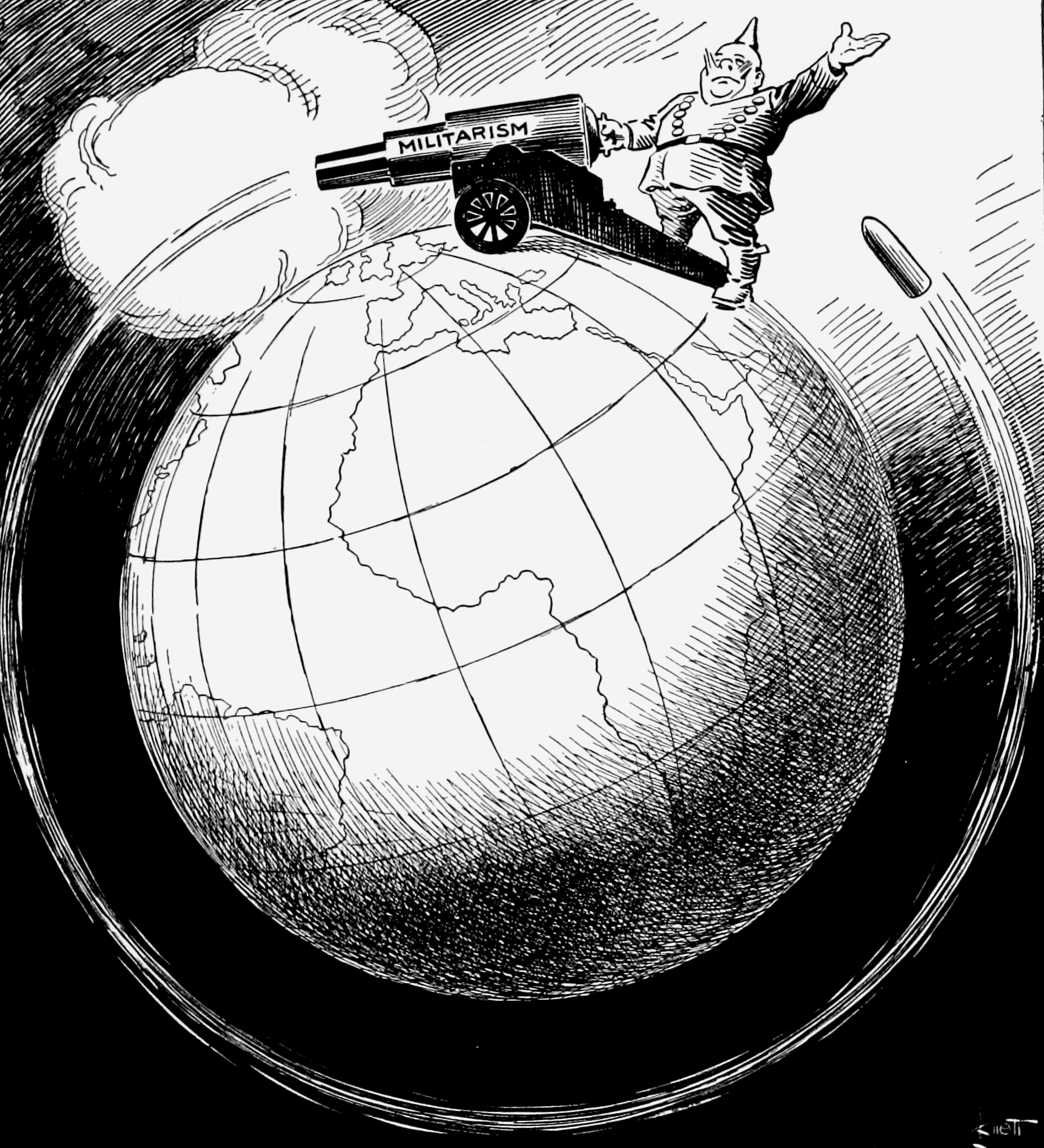
It Shoots Further Than He Dreams by John F. Knott. War cartoon depicting the Kaiser shooting a canon labeled "Militarism." First published on March 26, 1918.

Knott was born in Pilsen, Bohemia, to his father Francis Joseph and mother, Anna Knott. At 5 years of age, he and his widowed mother moved to Sioux City, Iowa. When Knott was only 16, he published his first drawing for the Sioux City Journal. After much persuasion, he talked his mother into letting him go to Chicago, Illinois. He was hoping to become a staff cartoonist with a newspaper but instead accepted to work as a cub draftsman for an architect. While working, he also took night classes at the Holmes School of Illustration.

In 1901, Knott took up a job offer from a Sioux City engraver. He spent his first four years in Dallas, Texas illustrating harness and saddlery catalogs for White Engraving Company. He later met D. Prescott Toomey, an artist and the managing editor of the Dallas Morning News. Toomey later offered Knott work as a full-time artist for the newspaper. Knott started his career with the News on December 1, 1905, where he would perform artistic duties and general illustration. Knott was losing hope for his talent to be recognized in Dallas. On January 1, 1906, he signed his first piece of artwork. Several years later, after realizing he needed more training and practice, Knott and his family moved to Munich, Germany. There he spent three semesters at the Royal Academy of Art and spent all of his money. He later accepted the job opportunity that the News offered him. In November 1911, Knott's work started to appear on the front page of the news. During Woodrow Wilson's first presidential campaign and World War I, Knott began drawing daily cartoons and attracted national and international attention. In 1957, Knott retired from the News. During his fifty-year career as a cartoonist, he created more than 15,000 cartoons. Knott taught painting in Dallas public schools for almost twenty years.

Knott was a member of the Philosophical Society of Texas and the Texas State Historical Association.

On February 22, 1907, Knott married Carrie Louise Bowen, and together they had four children. Knott died in Dallas on February 16, 1963.

== Awards ==
- Honorary degree by Baylor University (1920)
- National Headliners' Club Award (1939)
- National Safety Council citation (1941)
- The State Department (1950)
- Society of Professional Journalists recognized him as best cartoonist (1951)

== Books ==
- War Cartoons (1918)
