= The Kansas City Star =

American daily newspaper serving Kansas City, Missouri

Coordinates: 39°5′34″N 94°34′51″W

- The May 2, 2011, front page of The Kansas City Star, with headline reporting the killing of Osama bin Laden
- Type: Daily newspaper
- Format: Broadsheet
- Owner: McClatchy
- Editor: Andale Gross
- Founded: 1880; 146 years ago
- Headquarters: 1601 McGee; Kansas City, MO 64108; USA
- Circulation: 89,175 Daily; 109,438 Sunday (as of 2020).
- ISSN: 0745-1067
- OCLC number: 3555868
- Website: kansascity.com

The Kansas City Star is a newspaper based in Kansas City, Missouri. Published since 1880, the paper is the recipient of eight Pulitzer Prizes.

The Star is most notable for its influence on the career of President Harry S. Truman and as the newspaper where a young Ernest Hemingway honed his writing style. The paper is the major newspaper of the Kansas City metropolitan area and has widespread circulation in western Missouri and eastern Kansas.

== History ==
=== Nelson family ownership (1880–1926) ===
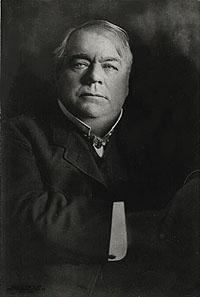
William Rockhill Nelson

The paper, originally called The Kansas City Evening Star, was founded September 18, 1880, by William Rockhill Nelson and Samuel E. Morss. The two moved to Missouri after selling the newspaper that became the Fort Wayne News Sentinel (and earlier owned by Nelson's father) in Nelson's Indiana hometown, where Nelson was campaign manager in the unsuccessful presidential run of Samuel Tilden.

Morss quit the newspaper business within a year and a half because of ill health. At the time there were three daily competitors – the Evening Mail; The Kansas City Times; and the Kansas City Journal.

Competitor Times editor Eugene Field wrote this about the new newspaper:

Twinkle, twinkle, little Star
Bright and gossipy you are;
We can daily hear you speak
For a paltry dime a week.

Nelson's business strategy called for cheap advance subscriptions and an intention to be "absolutely independent in politics, aiming to deal by all men and all parties with impartiality and fearlessness.".

He purchased the Kansas City Evening Mail (and its Associated Press evening franchise) in 1882. The paper name was changed to The Kansas City Star in 1885. Nelson started the Weekly Kansas City Star in 1890 and the Sunday Kansas City Star in 1894. In 1901 Nelson also bought the morning paper The Kansas City Times (and its morning Associated Press franchise). Nelson announced the arrival of the "24 Hour Star."

In August 1902, future president Harry S. Truman worked in the mailroom for two weeks, making $7.00 the first week and $5.40 the second. In 1950, then-president Truman half joked in an unmailed letter to Star editor Roy Roberts, "If the Star is at all mentioned in history, it will be because the President of the U.S. worked there for a few weeks in 1901 [sic]."

The paper was first printed on the second story of a three-story building at 407–409 Delaware. In 1881, it moved 14 W. 5th Street. In 1882, it moved to 115 W. 6th. In 1889, it moved to 804–806 Wyandotte. Sometime between 1896 and 1907, it was located at 1025–1031 Grand. In 1911, it moved into its Jarvis Hunt-designed building at 18th and Grand.

Nelson died in 1915. Nelson provided in his will that his newspaper was to support his wife and daughter and then be sold.

Ernest Hemingway was a reporter for the Star from October 1917 to April 1918. Hemingway credited Star editor C.G. "Pete" Wellington with changing a wordy high-schooler's writing style into clear, provocative English. Throughout his lifetime, Hemingway referred to this admonition from The Star Copy Style, the paper's famous and often used style guide:

Use short sentences. Use short first paragraphs. Use vigorous English. Be positive, not negative.

Nelson's wife died in 1921; his daughter Laura Kirkwood died in a Baltimore hotel room in 1926 at the age of 43.

=== Employee ownership (1926–1977) ===
Laura's husband Irwin Kirkwood, who was editor of the paper, led the employee purchase. Kirkwood in turn died of a heart attack in 1927 in Saratoga Springs, New York, where he had gone to sell thoroughbred horses. Stock in the company was then distributed among other employees.

Virtually all proceeds from the sale and remains of Nelson's $6 million personal fortune were donated to create the Nelson-Atkins Museum of Art on the site of Nelson's home, Oak Hall. Both papers were purchased by the employees in 1926 following the death of Nelson's daughter.

The Star enjoyed a pivotal role in American politics beginning in the late 1920s when Iowa-native Herbert Hoover was nominated at the 1928 Republican convention in Kansas City and continuing through 1960 at the conclusion of the presidency of Kansas favorite Dwight D. Eisenhower.

Editor Roy A. Roberts (1887–1967) was to make the newspaper a major force in Kansas politics. Roberts joined the paper in 1909 and was picked by Nelson for the Washington bureau in 1915. Roberts became managing editor in 1928. He was instrumental in pushing Kansas Governor Alf Landon for the Republican nomination in 1936; Landon was defeated in the general election by Franklin D. Roosevelt.

In 1942, the Journal, the last daily competitor, ceased publication. The Journal had offered unwavering support of Tom Pendergast's political machine; once Pendergast had fallen from power, the paper suffered.

In 1945, the paper bought the Flambeau Paper Mill in Park Falls, Wisconsin to provide newsprint. The mill had labor problems and would eventually be cited for pollution problems, and the Star eventually divested itself of the mill in 1971.

Roberts was elevated to president of the Star in 1947. The Star was not particularly kind to hometown Democrat Harry Truman, who had been backed by famed big city Democratic machine boss Tom Pendergast. In 1953, the Truman administration in its closing days filed antitrust charges against the Star over its ownership of WDAF-TV. The Star launched radio station WDAF on May 16, 1922, and television outlet WDAF-TV on October 19, 1949. The Star lost its case and had to sign a consent decree in 1957 that led to the sale of the broadcast stations.

With the influence of the Star in Truman's hometown, the newspaper and Roberts were the subject of an April 12, 1948, cover issue of Time magazine.

In 1954, Topeka correspondent Alvin McCoy won a Pulitzer Prize for a series of articles questioning the business dealings of the Republican national chairman. Roberts reported the Pulitzer Prize in a four-paragraph item.

Roberts semi-retired in 1963, officially retired in 1965, and died in 1967.

=== Corporate ownership (1977–present) ===
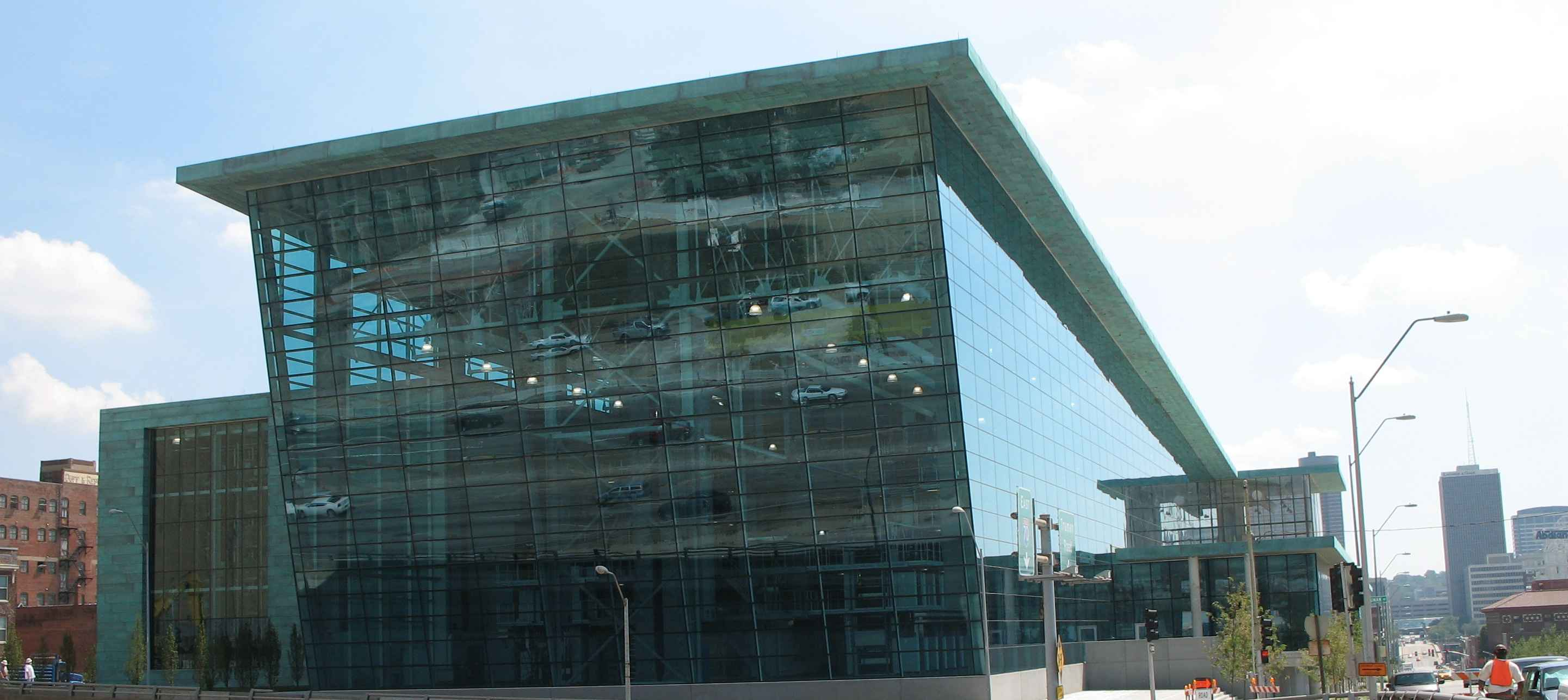
The printing plant which opened in June 2006. The headquarters is the red brick building on the lower right.

==== Capital Cities/Disney (1977–1997) ====
Employee ownership of the Times and Star ended in 1977 with their purchase by Capital Cities Communications. In 1990, the Star became a morning newspaper, taking the place of what was then the larger Kansas City Times, which ceased publication. The Walt Disney Company acquired Capital Cities/ABC in January 1996. Disney sold the paper to Knight Ridder in May 1997 as Disney moved to concentrate on broadcast rather than newspaper investments. Under Capital Cities ownership, the newspaper won three Pulitzer Prizes (1982, 1982, 1992).

==== Knight Ridder/McClatchy (1997–2020) ====
Knight Ridder's legacy is a massive $199 million, two-block long, glass-enclosed printing and distribution plant on the northeast side of the Star's landmark red brick headquarters at 1729 Grand Avenue (now Boulevard). The plant began printing in June 2006. It took nearly four years to build and is considered a major part of the effort to revitalize downtown Kansas City. The plant contains four 60-foot-high presses. On June 4, 2006, the first edition of the Star came out from the new presses with a major redesign in the sections and the logo. The new paper design involved shrinking its broadsheet width from 15 to 12 inches and shrinking the length from 22 3/4 to 21 1/2 inches.

The McClatchy Company bought Knight Ridder in June 2006.

In 2017, the Star sold its historic headquarters building at 1729 Grand Boulevard and moved its offices across McGee Street to its pressroom building. The Star then sold the pressroom building in 2019 and leased it back for 30 years.

In February 2020, McClatchy filed for bankruptcy and Chatham Asset Management LLC bought it at auction.

In March 2020, The Star moved to a six day printing schedule, eliminating its printed Saturday edition.

On November 10, 2020, the Star reported, "Printing of The Star will move up Interstate 35 to The Des Moines Register".

==== Apology for racism in coverage ====
On December 21, 2020, the paper issued an apology for a history of racism in its news coverage. A column by Mike Fannin, president and editor, said "For 140 years, it has been one of the most influential forces in shaping Kansas City and the region. And yet for much of its early history—through sins of both commission and omission—it disenfranchised, ignored and scorned generations of Black Kansas Citians. It reinforced Jim Crow laws and redlining. Decade after early decade it robbed an entire community of opportunity, dignity, justice and recognition." His column launched a six-part series in which the paper promised to deeply examine past coverage by the paper and its former sister paper the Kansas City Times, in coverage he described as routinely sickening the reporters who worked on the story.

== Pulitzer Prizes ==
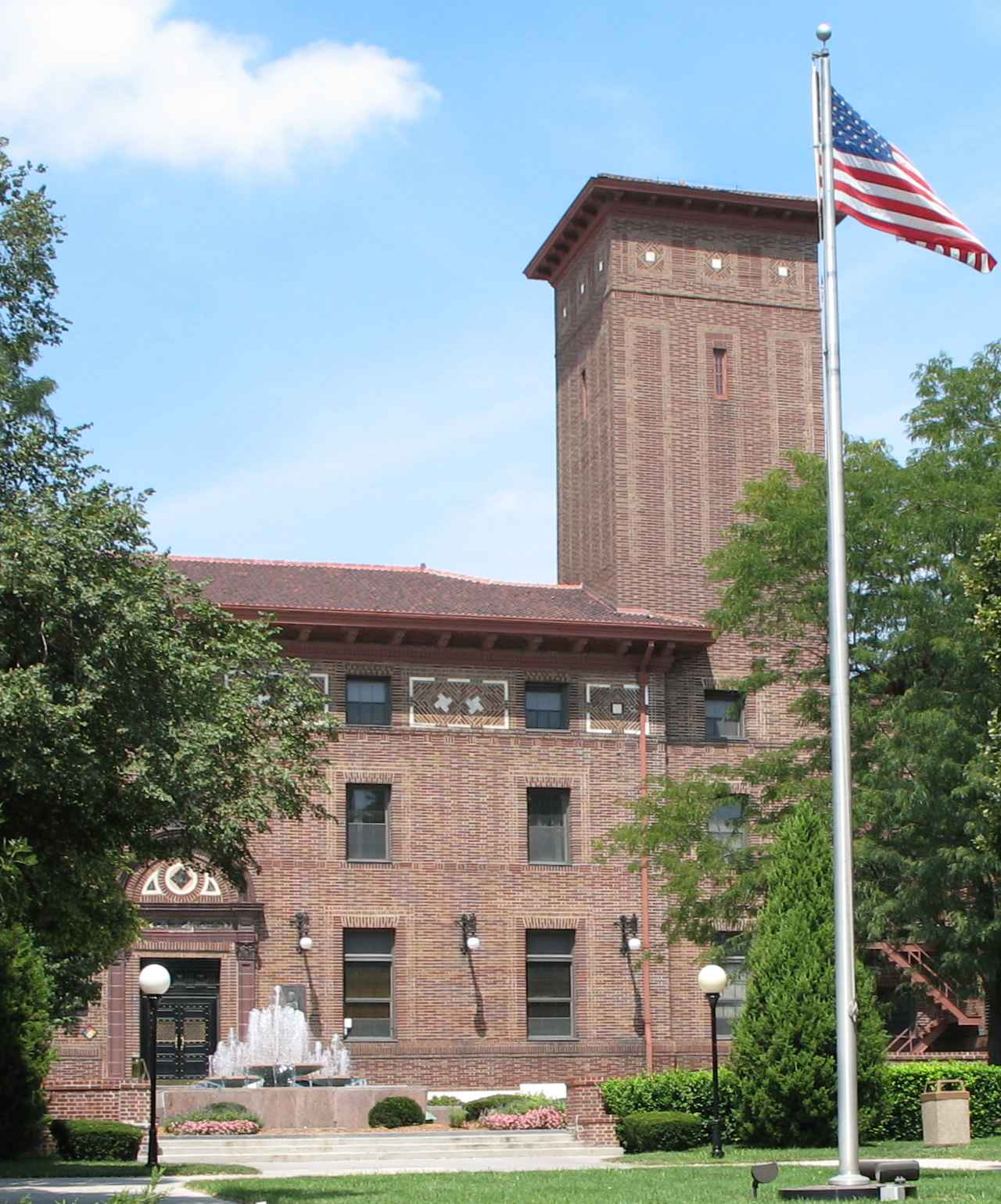
Star headquarters in the 1911 Jarvis Hunt–designed building that is on the National Register of Historic Places

The newspaper has won eight Pulitzer Prizes:

- 1931 Pulitzer Prize for Reporting – A. B. MacDonald, "for his work in connection with a murder in Amarillo, Texas."
- 1933 Pulitzer Prize for Editorial Writing – no author named
- 1944 Pulitzer Prize for Editorial Writing – Henry Haskell, "for editorials written during the calendar year 1943."
- 1952 Pulitzer Prize Special Citation – "for the news coverage of the great regional flood of 1951 in Kansas and Northwestern Missouri –– a distinguished example of editing and reporting that also gave the advance information that achieved the maximum of public protection."
- 1954 Pulitzer Prize for Local Reporting, No Edition Time – Alvin Scott McCoy, "for a series of exclusive stories which led to the resignation under fire of C. Wesley Roberts as Republican National Chairman."
- 1982 Pulitzer Prize for Local General or Spot News Reporting – "for coverage of the Hyatt Regency Hotel disaster and identification of its causes" (along with the Kansas City Times)
- 1982 Pulitzer Prize for National Reporting – Rick Atkinson (of the Kansas City Times), "for the uniform excellence of his reporting and writing on stories of national import."
- 1992 Pulitzer Prize for National Reporting – Jeff Taylor and Mike McGraw, "for their critical examination of the U.S. Department of Agriculture."
- 2022 Pulitzer Prize for Commentary – Melinda Henneberger, "for persuasive columns demanding justice for alleged victims of a retired police detective accused of being a sexual predator."

=== Finalists ===
The newspaper has been a finalist for Pulitzers on three occasions:

- 1996 Pulitzer Prize for Explanatory Journalism – Chris Lester and Jeffrey Spivak, "for their series on the impact of spreading suburban growth."
- 2018 Pulitzer Prize for Public Service – "for courageous, revelatory journalism that exposed a state government's decades-long 'obsession with secrecy,' intended to shield executive decisions and suppress transparency and accountability in law enforcement agencies, child welfare services and other sectors of the government.".
- 2019 Pulitzer Prize for Commentary – Melinda Henneberger, "for examining, in spare and courageous writing, institutional sexism and misogyny within her hometown NFL team, her former governor's office and the Catholic Church."

== Other awards ==
In 2018, the paper received two awards at the Scripps Howard Foundation's National Journalism Awards. The paper itself won in the First Amendment category for its 2017 feature "Why so secret, Kansas?," on the topic of official state agency resistance to the release of public records, while columnist Melinda Henneberger won in the Opinion category.

== Notable past columnists ==
- Edna Marie Dunn
- Ernest Hemingway
- Joe McGuff
- Joe Posnanski
- Lee Shippey
- William D. Tammeus
- William E. Vaughan
- William Allen White
- Jason Whitlock
