= Hatcher Hughes =

American dramatist

- Born: 12 February 1881; Polkville, North Carolina
- Died: 19 October 1945 (aged 64); New York City
- Education: University of North Carolina, Chapel Hill (BA, MA)
- Occupation: Playwright
- Years active: 1918–1934
- Spouse: Janet Ranney

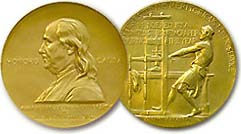

Harvey Hatcher Hughes (12 February 1881, Polkville, North Carolina – 19 October 1945, New York City) was an American playwright. He was on the teaching staff of Columbia University from 1912 onward. He was awarded the 1924 Pulitzer Prize for Drama for his 1923 play Hell-Bent Fer Heaven.

== Early life and education ==
He was the tenth of eleven children of Andrew Jackson Hughes and Martha Jane Gold Hughes. He received both his undergraduate degree (1907) and master's degree (1909) in English from the University of North Carolina at Chapel Hill.

== Career ==
Hell-bent fer Heaven (1923) was performed 128 times at the Klaw Theater (which later became the Avon and then CBS Theater #2). The play starred multiple Tony Award and Pulitzer Prize winner George Abbott (author of The Pajama Game, Fiorello, and Damn Yankees) and Clara Blandick (who played Auntie Em in The Wizard of Oz). It won a Pulitzer Prize was made into a movie in 1926.

Hughes was a professor at Columbia University. His detailed correspondence is kept in the University of North Carolina archives.

== Family ==
In 1930 he married Janet Ranney Cool. The marriage produced a daughter, Ann Ranney Hughes. During the First World War, he served as an Army captain. He and his family divided their time between their home in New York City and their farm in West Cornwall, Connecticut.

== Works ==
- A Marriage Made in Heaven (1918)
- Wake Up, Jonathan! (with Elmer Rice, 1921)
- Hell-Bent Fer Heaven (1923), made into the 1926 motion picture of the same name
- Ruint (1920)
- It's a Grand Life (1930)
- The Lord Blesses the Bishop (co-author, 1934)
