= Justin Harvey Smith =

American historian (1857-1930)

Justin Harvey Smith (born January 13, 1857, Boscawen, New Hampshire; died March 21, 1930, Brooklyn, New York) was an American historian and specialist on the Mexican–American War.

Smith was educated at Dartmouth College (B.A. 1877; M.A. 1881) and Union Theological Seminary (1879–1881). He was awarded an honorary L.L. D. degree from Norwich University, Norwich, VT in 1908. Smith worked for Charles Scribner's Sons publishers 1881–1883 and Ginn & Co. 1883–1898 (becoming a partner in 1890); he was Professor of Modern History at Dartmouth 1899–1908. He resigned his professorship in 1908 to pursue historical research, and published The Annexation of Texas in 1911 and The War with Mexico in 1919. For the latter, he received the Pulitzer Prize in 1920 and the first Loubat Prize in 1923. From 1917 to 1923, Smith was chairman of the Historical Manuscripts Commission of the American Historical Association.

Smith also wrote Our Struggle for the Fourteenth Colony in 1907. He wrote Arnold's March from Cambridge to Quebec in 1903. In 1899 he wrote The Troubadours at Home.

Smith's papers were donated to the Latin American collection of the University of Texas library, (now the Benson Latin American Collection), by a book dealer, Michael M. Russel, who had acquired them. The collection enriched the university's materials on the Mexican–American War.

On May 22, 1892, Smith married Mary Ellen Barnard in Boston, Massachusetts; they divorced in 1895. Her stage name was Marie Ellene Barna, also known as Marie Russak.

Smith was the son of Rev. Ambrose Smith (1820–1882) and Cynthia Marie Egerton (1821–1899), and a descendant of Gov. William Bradford of the Mayflower via his mother's father, Ariel Egerton (1789–1859).
