= William L. Laurence =

American journalist

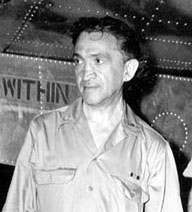
- Laurence on the island of Tinian before the atomic bombings of Hiroshima and Nagasaki.
- Born: Leib Wolf Siew; March 7, 1888; Salantai, Lithuania, Russian Empire
- Died: March 19, 1977 (aged 89); Mallorca, Spain
- Other name: "Atomic Bill"
- Citizenship: United States (naturalized 1913)
- Education: Boston University
- Employer: The New York Times
- Known for: Reporting on the Atomic Age

William Leonard Laurence (born Leib Wolf Siew, March 7, 1888 – March 19, 1977) was an American science journalist best known for his work at The New York Times. Born in the Russian Empire, he won two Pulitzer Prizes. As the official historian of the Manhattan Project, he was the only journalist to witness the Trinity test and the atomic bombing of Nagasaki. He is credited with coining the term "Atomic Age," which became popular in the 1950s. He dismissed the destructive effects of radiation sickness as Japanese propaganda in The New York Times. Even though he had seen the effects first-hand, he moonlighted for the War Department's press office, and United States military officials instructed him to do so in order to discredit earlier reports by independent journalist Wilfred Burchett, the first Western reporter on-site after the bombings.

== Early life and career ==
Laurence was born Leib Wolf Siew in Salantai, a city in the Russian Empire that is now in Lithuania. His family was Jewish, and his brother, sister, and mother, who stayed in Lithuania, perished in the Holocaust. At the age of 17 and after participating in the Russian Revolution of 1905, where his nose had been pushed in by the butt of a Cossack rifle, he emigrated to the United States in 1905, and he soon changed his name, taking "William" after William Shakespeare, "Leonard" after Leonardo da Vinci, and "Laurence" after a street he lived on in Roxbury, Massachusetts (but spelled with a "u” instead of a “w” in reference to Friedrich Schiller's Laura).

Although he attended Harvard University (1908–1911; 1914–1915) and allegedly completed all coursework for an undergraduate degree in philosophy, Laurence "struggled academically and financially" throughout his studies; according to biographer Vincent Kiernan, his institutional records contained "multiple complaints that he failed to repay loans from the university and individuals," while "holds on his account repeatedly interrupted his studies." Following a September 1915 skirmish with roommate Benjamin Stolberg, Laurence was found guilty of assault and battery before being "released without having to spend any time in jail." A subsequent May 1917 graduation attempt was thwarted due to another block on his account from residual debt. (Laurence maintained in a later Columbia University oral history that his degree was not conferred due to his debt and a personality conflict with the dean of Harvard College.)

Following additional studies at the University of Besançon (1919) and Harvard Law School (1921), he received an LL.B. from the Boston University School of Law which he seldom emphasized in press accounts in 1925. That same year, Laurence was "caught trying to take an examination in elementary German for a Harvard College student whom Laurence had been tutoring"; while he would aggressively lobby for the retroactive conferral of his Harvard degree and membership in the Harvard Club of New York City between 1937 and 1948 (claiming that he only took the exam amid the threat of suicide from the student while soliciting assistance at various junctures from Harvard College Dean Wilbur J. Bender, Harvard Board of Overseers member Ralph Lowell and University President James B. Conant), Bender eventually concluded that an exception to the cheating policy would have been inappropriate regardless of his status within the university. A 1955 article about Laurence in the internal Times Talk newsletter asserted that he graduated from Harvard in 1915, while Laurence claimed to have graduated with honors in four years in a 1970 interview.

He became a naturalized US citizen in 1913. During World War I, he served with the US Army Signal Corps.

Eschewing a legal career, he began working as a journalist for the New York World in 1926. In 1930, he joined The New York Times and specialized when possible in reporting scientific issues. He married Florence Davidow in 1931.

In 1934, Laurence co-founded the National Association of Science Writers, and in 1936, he covered the Harvard Tercenary Conference of Arts and Sciences; he and four other science reporters shared the 1937 Pulitzer Prize for Reporting for that work.

== Nicknamed "Atomic Bill" ==
A front page copy of The New York Times city edition dated August 7, 1945, featuring the atomic bombing of Hiroshima, Japan

On May 5, 1940, Laurence published a front-page exclusive in the New York Times on successful attempts in isolating uranium-235 which were reported in Physical Review, and outlined many (somewhat hyperbolic) claims about the possible future of nuclear power. He had assembled it in part out of his own fear that Nazi Germany was attempting to develop atomic energy, and had hoped the article would galvanize a U.S. effort.

Though his article had no effect on the U.S. bomb program, it was passed to the Soviet mineralogist Vladimir Vernadsky by his son, George Vernadsky, a professor of history at Yale University. It motivated Vernadsky to urge Soviet authorities to embark on their own atomic program, and established one of the first commissions to formulate "a plan of measures which it would be necessary to realize in connection with the possibility of using intraatomic energy". A Soviet atomic bomb project got started c. 1942; a full-scale Soviet atomic energy program began after the war.

On September 7, 1940, The Saturday Evening Post ran an article by Laurence on nuclear fission, "The Atom Gives Up". In 1943, government officials asked librarians nationwide to withdraw the issue.

In 1945, Major General Leslie Groves approached Jack Lockhart, Assistant Director of The Censorship Office, to serve as press release writer and official historian of the Manhattan Project. Lockhart turned the role down and instead recommended Laurence. In the spring of 1945, Groves met with Laurence, then aged 57, and later summoned him to the secret Los Alamos laboratory in New Mexico to serve as the official historian of the Manhattan Project.

In this capacity he was also the author of many of the first official press releases about nuclear weapons, including some delivered by the Department of War and President Harry S. Truman. He was the only journalist present at the Trinity test in July 1945, and beforehand prepared statements to be delivered in case the test ended in a disaster which killed those involved. As part of his work related to the Project, he also interviewed the airmen who flew on the mission to drop the atomic bomb on the city of Hiroshima, Japan. Laurence himself flew aboard the B-29 The Great Artiste, which served as a blast instrumentation aircraft, for the atomic bombing of Nagasaki.

US military encouraged Laurence to write articles dismissing the reports of radiation sickness as part of Japanese efforts to undermine American morale. Laurence, who was also being paid by the US War Department, wrote the articles the US military wanted even though he was aware of the effects of radiation after observing the first atomic bomb test on July 16, 1945, and its effect on local residents and livestock.

For his 1945 coverage of the atomic bomb, beginning with the eyewitness account from Nagasaki, he won a second Pulitzer Prize for Reporting in 1946. At the office of the Times he was thereafter referred to as "Atomic Bill", to differentiate him from William H. Lawrence, a political reporter at the newspaper.

Laurence visited the test Able site at Bikini Atoll aboard the press ship Appalachian, for the Trinity test on July 1, 1946. In his autobiography, Richard Feynman, who had initially shown Laurence around the Los Alamos site, mentioned Laurence standing next to him during the Trinity test. Feynman stated, "I had been the one who was supposed to have taken him around. Then it was found that it was too technical for him, and so later H.D. Smyth came and I showed him around." In 1946, Laurence published an account of the Trinity test as Dawn Over Zero, which went through at least two revisions.

He continued to work at the Times through the 1940s and into the 1950s, and published a book on defense against nuclear war in 1950. In 1951, his book The Hell Bomb warned about the use of a cobalt bomb – a form of hydrogen bomb (still an untested device at the time he wrote it) engineered to produce a maximum amount of nuclear fallout.

In 1956, he was present at the testing of a hydrogen bomb at the Pacific Proving Grounds. That same year, he was appointed science editor of the Times, succeeding Waldemar Kaempffert. He served in this capacity until he retired in 1964.

He received honorary doctorates from Boston University (Sc.D., 1946), the Stevens Institute of Technology (Sc.D., 1951), Grinnell College (D.H.L., 1951) and Yeshiva University (D.H.L., 1957).

== Personal life and death ==
Laurence married Florence Davidow in 1931. They had no children and retired to Mallorca, Spain in 1968. He died in 1977 on Mallorca, of complications from a blood clot in his brain.

== Legacy, posthumous criticism ==
Laurence is one of the first commentators to have compared the atomic bomb to a monster, which helped to create a cultural trope that may have influenced such films as The Beast from 20,000 Fathoms and Godzilla: "It kept struggling in an elemental fury, like a creature in act of breaking the bonds that held it down" and "a monstrous prehistoric creature."

Nuclear historian Alex Wellerstein has called Laurence "part huckster, part journalist, all wild card ... improbable in every way, a real-life character with more strangeness than would seem tolerable in pure fiction." In 2021, Wellerstein wrote that Laurence was "willingly complicit in the government's propaganda project", referring to Laurence's collaboration with the United States Department of War to produce articles on the atomic bomb, its production and effects.

== Bibliography ==
- Dawn Over Zero: The Story of the Atomic Bomb, New York: Knopf, 1946.
- We Are Not Helpless: How We Can Defend Ourselves against Atomic Weapons, New York, 1950.
- The Hell Bomb, New York: Knopf, 1951.
- Men and Atoms: The Discovery, the Uses, and the Future of Atomic Energy, New York: Simon and Schuster, 1959.

== See also ==
- Propaganda in the United States
- American propaganda during World War II

== Sources ==
- Keever, Beverly Deepe. News Zero: the New York Times and the Bomb. Common Courage Press, 2004. ISBN 1-56751-282-8
- Weart, Spencer. Nuclear Fear: A History of Images. Cambridge, MA: Harvard University Press, 1988.
