= Howard W. Blakeslee =

American journalist

Howard W. Blakeslee

Howard Walter Blakeslee (March 21, 1880 - May 2, 1952) was an American journalist. He was the Associated Press's first full-time science reporter and was awarded the Pulitzer Prize for Reporting in 1937.

Blakeslee was born in 1880 to Jesse Walter Blakeslee and Jennie (Howard) in New Dungeness (now Dungeness), Washington. After attending the University of Michigan, he became, in 1901, a news writer (soon after, feature writer) for the Detroit Journal. Between 1903 and 1905, he was a sports writer for Chicago and Detroit newspapers.

He joined the Associated Press in 1906. Between then and 1916, he was a bureau chief in New Orleans, Atlanta, and Dallas. He was news editor in Chicago from 1916 to 1926, then moved to New York where, after two years as photo service editor, his title became Science Editor, AP's first.

Blakeslee (along with four other reporters from different papers) won the 1937 Pulitzer Prize for the group's collective coverage of science at Harvard University's tercentenary celebration. A better-known winner that year was Margaret Mitchell, who won for Gone With the Wind.

Blakeslee reported extensively on the atomic bomb in the immediate post-war era and was among the group of reporters who witnessed the early tests at Yucca Flat. Also interested in the subject of atomic power, his book publications include Miracle of Atomics (1945), The Atomic Future (1946), and Atomic Progress: The Hydrogen Race (1951).

In addition to the Pulitzer, his awards include the National Headliners Club award (1940), the George Westinghouse Science Writers award of the American Association for the Advancement of Science (1946). The Howard W. Blakeslee Award of the American Heart Association is named in his honor.

Blakeslee was married twice, first in 1906 to Marguerite Fortune and second, after the death of his first wife, to Rosamund Robinson in 1936. Blakeslee and Rosamund had three children: Howard, Rosamund, and Alan. His son from his first marriage, Alton Blakeslee, eventually succeeded him as science editor at AP, retiring in 1985. His granddaughter (Alton's daughter) is Sandra Blakeslee, a long-time science reporter for the New York Times. Sandra's son Matthew Blakeslee is also a full-time science writer, thus representing the fourth generation of Howard Blakeslee's notable science-reportorial dynasty. Howard Blakeslee died in 1952, shortly after returning from return a visit to the atomic bomb testing site in Nevada.
