= David Dietz =

David David Henry Dietz (6 October 1897 Cleveland – 9 December 1984 Cleveland) was an American science journalist and writer. He won a Pulitzer Prize in 1937.

Dietz attended Case Western Reserve University and received his bachelor's degree in 1919. In 1921 he took a position as science editor for the Scripps-Howard Newspapers, a job he kept until his retirement in 1977. From 1927 until his retirement, he was a lecturer in general science at his alma mater.

Dietz was a member of the Publicity Committee of the United States National Research Council's Division of Medical Science and of Harvard University's Institute on War Problems, and was a consultant to the U. S. Army Surgeon General from 1944 to 1947. He served as science correspondent for NBC News from 1940–1950, and was heard on Morgan Beatty News of the World over 181 stations.

== Awards ==
Dietz was recognized many times during his career for his contributions to science journalism. For "coverage of science at the tercentenary of Harvard University" in 1936, with Scripps-Howard, he shared the Pulitzer Prize for Reporting with writers for four other publishers. He also received the B. F. Goodrich Award for distinguished public service (1940), the Westinghouse Distinguished Science Writers Award (1946), the Lasker Award for medical journalism (1954), and the James T. Grady Award from the American Chemical Society (1961).

He received honorary degrees from Western Reserve (D. Litt., 1948) and from Bowling Green State University (1954).
