= 1927 Pulitzer Prize =

Awards for journalism and related fields

The following are the Pulitzer Prizes for 1927.

== Journalism awards ==
- Public Service:
  - Canton Daily News, for its brave, patriotic and effective fight for the ending of a vicious state of affairs brought about by collusion between city authorities and the criminal element, a fight which had a tragic result in the assassination of the editor of the paper, Mr. Don R. Mellett.
- Reporting:
  - John T. Rogers of the St. Louis Post-Dispatch, for the inquiry leading to the impeachment of Judge George W. English of the U.S. Court for the Eastern District of Illinois.
- Editorial Writing:
  - F. Lauriston Bullard of the Boston Herald, for "We Submit".

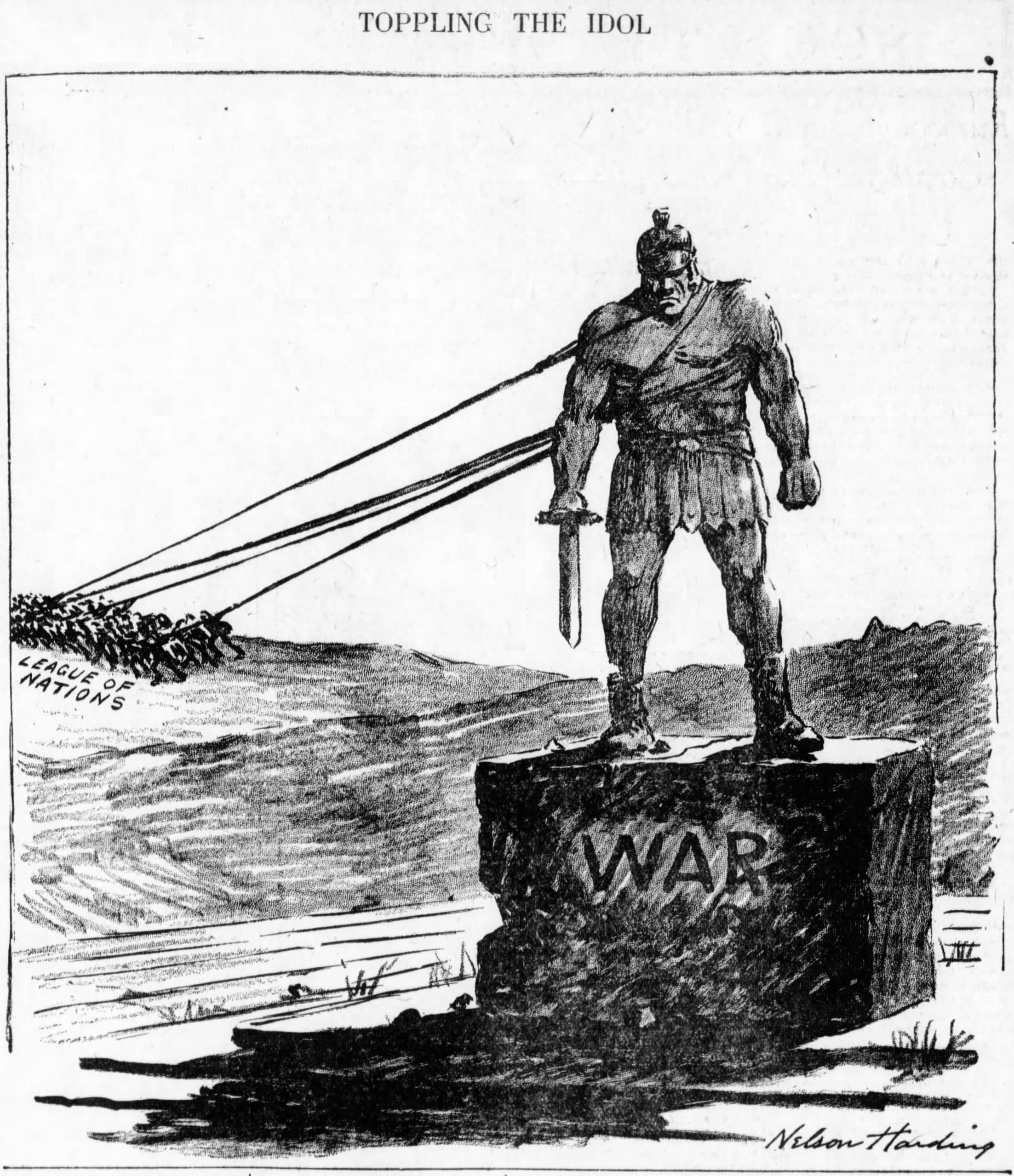
"Toppling the Idol", winner of the prize for Editorial Cartooning

- Editorial Cartooning:
  - Nelson Harding of the Brooklyn Daily Eagle, for "Toppling the Idol".

== Letters and Drama Awards ==
- Novel:
  - Early Autumn by Louis Bromfield (Stokes)
- Drama:
  - In Abraham's Bosom by Paul Green (McBride)
- History:
  - Pinckney's Treaty by Samuel Flagg Bemis (Johns Hopkins)
- Biography or Autobiography:
  - Whitman by Emory Holloway (Knopf)
- Poetry:
  - Fiddler's Farewell by Leonora Speyer (Knopf)
