= 1939 Pulitzer Prize =

Awards for journalism and related fields

The following are the Pulitzer Prizes for 1939

== Journalism awards ==
- Public Service:
  - Miami Daily News for its campaign for the recall of the Miami City Commission.
  - Honorable mention to the Waterbury Republican (Connecticut) for "exposure of municipal graft".
- Reporting:
  - Thomas Lunsford Stokes of the Scripps-Howard Newspaper Alliance for his series of articles on alleged intimidation of workers for the Works Progress Administration in Pennsylvania and Kentucky during an election. The articles were published in The New York World-Telegram.
- Correspondence:
  - Louis P. Lochner of the Associated Press for his dispatches from Berlin.
- Editorial Writing:
  - Ronald G. Callvert of The Oregonian (Portland, Oregon) for his distinguished editorial writing during the year as exemplified by the editorial entitled "My Country 'Tis of Thee".

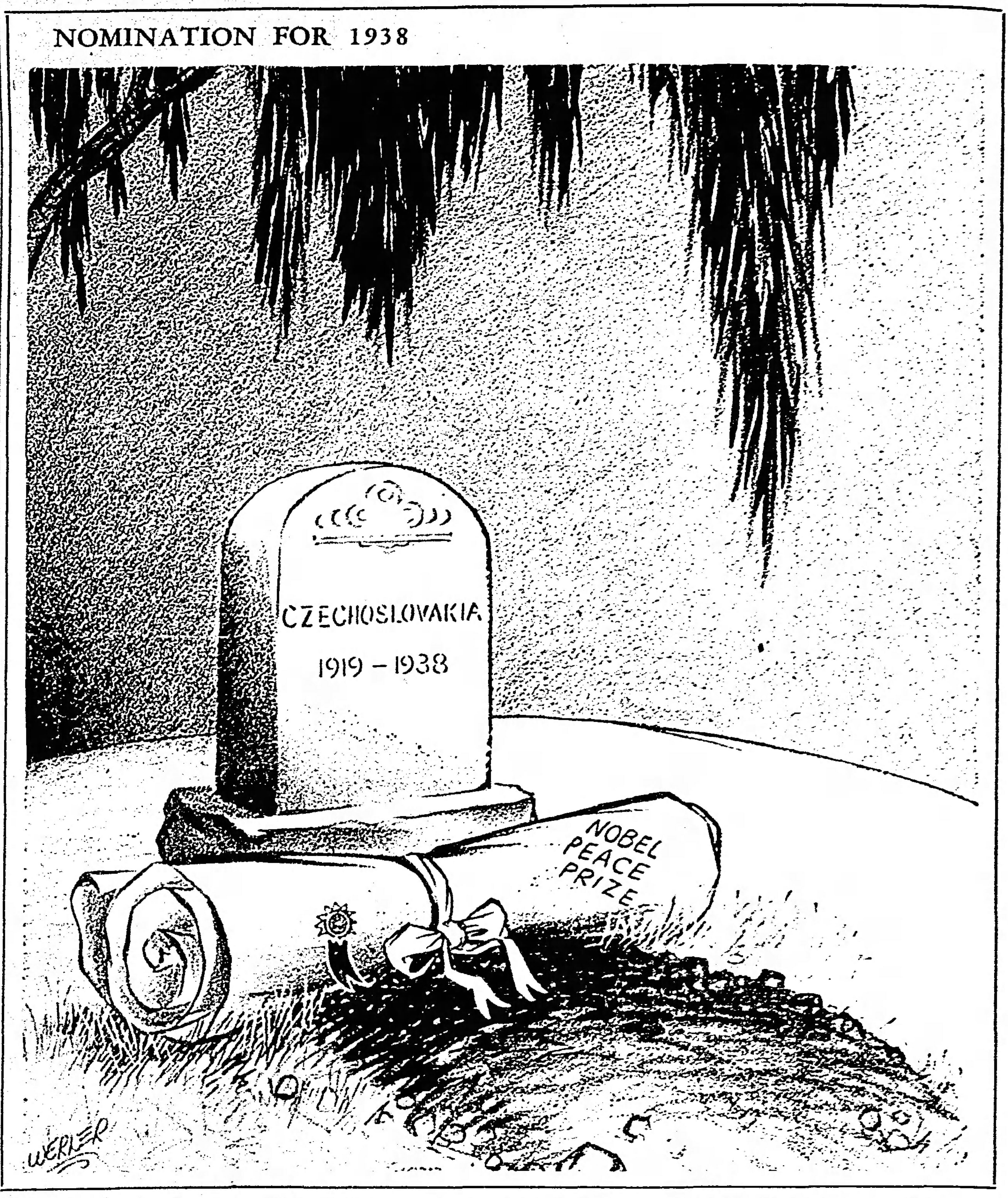
"Nomination for 1938", the prize-winning editorial cartoon

- Editorial Cartooning:
  - Charles G. Werner of the Daily Oklahoman for "Nomination for 1938".

== Letters and Drama Awards ==
- Novel:
  - The Yearling by Marjorie Kinnan Rawlings (Scribner).
- Drama:
  - Abe Lincoln in Illinois by Robert E. Sherwood (Scribner).
- History:
  - A History of American Magazines by Frank Luther Mott (Harvard Univ. Press).
- Biography or Autobiography:
  - Benjamin Franklin by Carl Van Doren (Viking).
- Poetry:
  - Selected Poems by John Gould Fletcher (Farrar).
