= 1933 Pulitzer Prize =

Awards for journalism and related fields

The following are the Pulitzer Prizes for 1933 .

== Journalism awards ==
- Public Service:
  - New York World-Telegram for its series of articles on veterans relief, on the real estate bond evil, the campaign urging voters in the late New York City municipal election to "write in" the name of Joseph V. McKee, and also the articles exposing the lottery schemes of several fraternal organizations.
  - Honorable mentions:
    - The Detroit Free Press for a series of articles by Clifford A. Prevost entitled "War on Waste: Save the People's Money".
    - Philadelphia Record for its successful drive against a proposed municipal income tax.
- Reporting:
  - Francis A. Jamieson of the Associated Press for his prompt, full, skillful and prolonged coverage of news of the kidnapping of the infant son of Charles Lindbergh on March 1, 1932, from the first announcement of the kidnapping until after the discovery of the baby's body nearby the Lindbergh home on May 12.
  - Honorable mentions:
    - Eddie Neil of the Associated Press for his story of a ride down the Olympic bobsled run at Lake Placid, New York.
    - Lee McCardell of the Baltimore Evening Sun for stories on the Bonus Army.
    - Thomas H. Henry of the Washington Evening Star for stories on the Bonus Army.
    - Chester G. Hanson of the Los Angeles Times for a series on the transient unemployed.
    - Carl Randau of the New York World-Telegram for accounts of a legislative investigation of the government of New York City.
- Correspondence:
  - Edgar Ansel Mowrer of the Chicago Daily News for his day-by-day coverage and interpretation of the series of German political crises in 1932, beginning with the presidential election and the struggle of Adolf Hitler for public office.
  - Honorable mention to Malcolm W. Bingay of The Detroit Free Press for his obituary of British scientist Ronald Ross.
- Editorial Writing:
  - The Kansas City Star for its series of editorials on national and international topics.

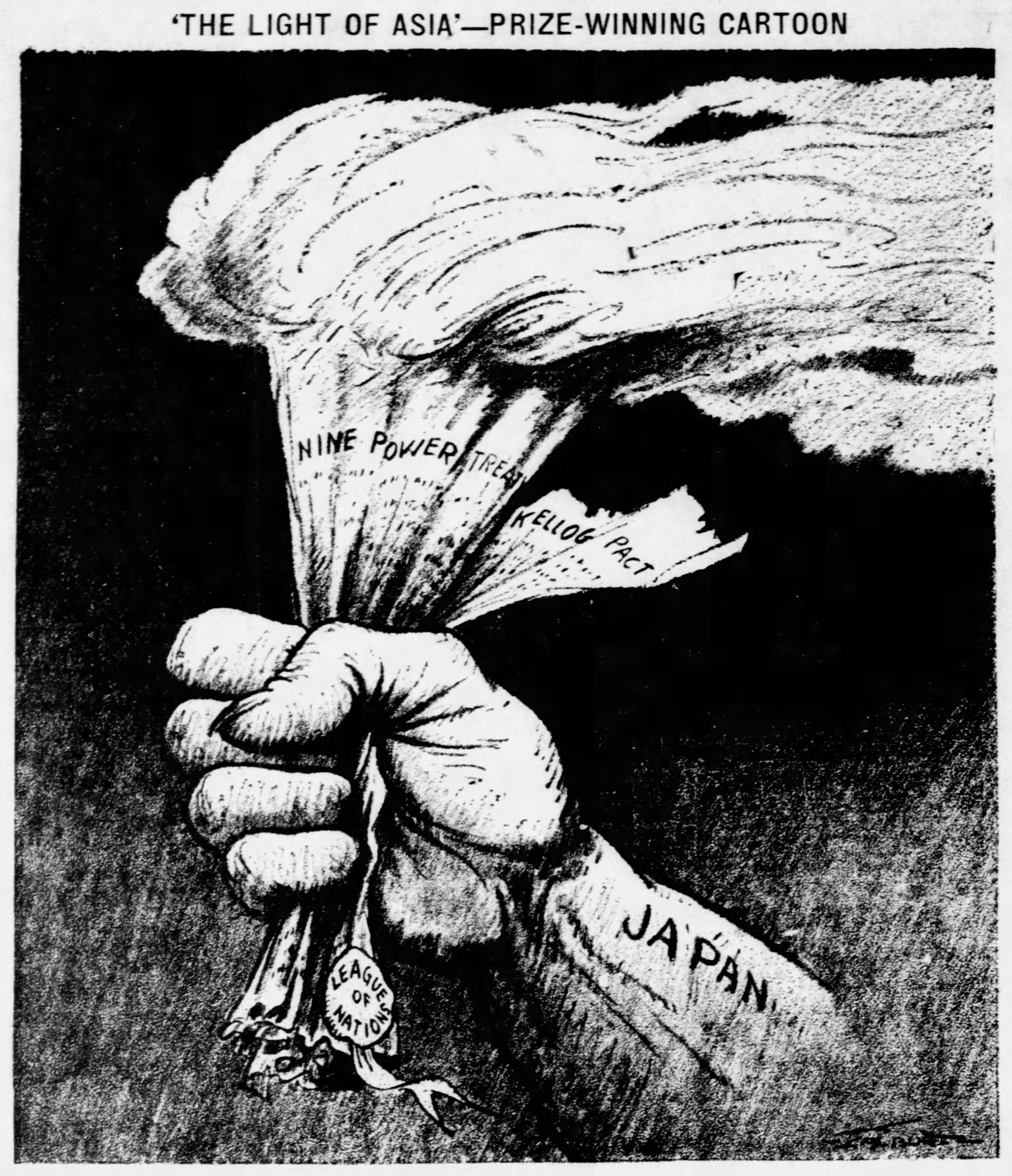
"The Light of Asia", the prize-winning editorial cartoon.

- Editorial Cartooning:
  - H. M. Talburt of The Washington Daily News for "The Light of Asia".

== Letters and Drama Awards ==
- Novel:
  - The Store by T. S. Stribling (Doubleday).
- Drama:
  - Both Your Houses by Maxwell Anderson (S. French).
- History:
  - The Significance of Sections in American History by Frederick Jackson Turner (Holt).
- Biography or Autobiography:
  - Biography of Grover Cleveland by Allan Nevins (Dodd).
- Poetry:
  - Conquistador by Archibald Macleish (Houghton).
