= Pulitzer Prize for Illustrated Reporting and Commentary =

American journalism award

The Pulitzer Prize for Illustrated Reporting and Commentary is one of the fourteen Pulitzer Prizes that is annually awarded for journalism in the United States. It is the successor to the Pulitzer Prize for Editorial Cartooning awarded from 1922 to 2021.

== History ==
Since 1922 the prize had been awarded for a distinguished editorial cartoon or portfolio of cartoons published during the year, characterized by originality, editorial effectiveness, quality of drawing, and pictorial effect.

Since 1980, finalists (usually two) have been announced in addition to the winner.

Only two comic strips have been awarded the prize: Doonesbury by Garry Trudeau in 1976 and Bloom County by Berkeley Breathed in 1987.

In 2021, with Ruben Bolling, Marty Two Bulls Sr, and Lalo Alcaraz the finalists, no winner was selected, which drew controversy. (The same thing happened in the category in 1923, 1936, 1960, 1965, and 1973, but it had not happened in 48 years, and it was the first time no winner was selected when the finalists' names had been made public.)

In 2022, the Editorial Cartooning prize was superseded by the revamped category of Illustrated Reporting and Commentary, In response, the Association of American Editorial Cartoonists "issued a statement calling for the Pulitzer board to reinstate Editorial Cartooning as its own category while also recognizing Illustrated Reporting as a separate form." They wrote:

"'Editorial cartoons are quick, in-the-moment commentary, whose artists have to educate themselves on complex issues and craft well-informed opinions in a single take that emphasizes clarity under daily deadlines. Illustrated reporting, or comics journalism, takes days, weeks, or months to craft a story, which can run for pages, and which may or may not be presenting an opinion.'"

The 2022 award went to a work of comics journalism.

== List of winners ==
Year	Winner	Organization	Rationale
1922	Rollin Kirby	New York World	"For 'On the Road to Moscow.'"
1923	No award given.		
1924	Jay Norwood Darling	Des Moines Register & Tribune	"For 'In Good Old USA.'"
1925	Rollin Kirby	New York World	"For 'News from the Outside World.'"
1926	D. R. Fitzpatrick	St. Louis Post-Dispatch	"For 'The Laws of Moses and the Laws of Today.'"
1927	Nelson Harding	Brooklyn Daily Eagle	"For 'Toppling the Idol.'"
1928	Nelson Harding	Brooklyn Daily Eagle	"For 'May His Shadow Never Grow Less.'"
1929	Rollin Kirby	New York World	"For 'Tammany.'"
1930	Charles R. Macauley	Brooklyn Daily Eagle	"For 'Paying for a Dead Horse.'"
1931	Edmund Duffy	The Baltimore Sun	"For 'An Old Struggle Still Going On.'"
1932	John T. McCutcheon	Chicago Tribune	"For 'A Wise Economist Asks a Question.'"
1933	H. M. Talburt	The Washington Daily News	"For 'The Light of Asia.'"
1934	Edmund Duffy	The Baltimore Sun	"For 'California Points with Pride!'"
1935	Ross A. Lewis	Milwaukee Journal	"For 'Sure, I'll Work for Both Sides.'"
1936	No award given.		
1937	C. D. Batchelor	New York Daily News	"For 'Come on in, I'll treat you right. I used to know your Daddy.'"
1938	Vaughn Shoemaker	Chicago Daily News	"For 'The Road Back.'"
1939	Charles G. Werner	Daily Oklahoman	"For 'Nomination for 1938.'"
1940	Edmund Duffy	The Baltimore Sun	"For 'The Outstretched Hand.'"
1941	Jacob Burck	Chicago Daily Times	"For 'If I Should Die Before I Wake.'"
1942	Herbert Lawrence Block	Newspaper Enterprise Association	"For 'British Plane.'"
1943	Jay Norwood Darling	Des Moines Register & Tribune	"For 'What a Place For a Waste Paper Salvage Campaign.'"
1944	Clifford K. Berryman	The Evening Star	"For 'But Where Is the Boat Going?'"
1945	Sergeant Bill Mauldin	United Feature Syndicate, Inc.	"For distinguished service as a cartoonist, as exemplified by the cartoon entitled, 'Fresh, spirited American troops, flushed with victory, are bringing in thousands of hungry, ragged, battle-weary prisoners,' in the series entitled, 'Up Front With Mauldin.'"
1946	Bruce Alexander Russell	Los Angeles Times	"For 'Time to Bridge That Gulch.'"
1947	Vaughn Shoemaker	Chicago Daily News	"For his cartoon, 'Still Racing His Shadow.'"
1948	Reuben L. Goldberg	New York Sun	"For 'Peace Today.'"
1949	Lute Pease	Newark Evening News	"For 'Who Me?'"
1950	James T. Berryman	The Evening Star	"For 'All Set for a Super-Secret Session in Washington.'"
1951	Reg (Reginald W.) Manning	Arizona Republic	"For 'Hats.'"
1952	Fred L. Packer	New York Mirror	"For 'Your Editors Ought to Have More Sense Than to Print What I Say!'"
1953	Edward D. Kuekes	Cleveland Plain Dealer	"For 'Aftermath.'"
1954	Herbert L. Block (Herblock)	The Washington Post and Times-Herald	"For a cartoon depicting the robed figure of Death saying to Stalin after he died, 'You Were Always A Great Friend of Mine, Joseph.'"
1955	Daniel R. Fitzpatrick	St. Louis Post-Dispatch	"For a cartoon published on June 8, 1954 entitled, 'How Would Another Mistake Help?' showing Uncle Sam, bayoneted rifle in hand, pondering whether to wade into a black marsh bearing the legend 'French Mistakes in Indo-China.' The award is also given for distinguished body of the work of Mr. Fitzpatrick in both 1954 and his entire career."
1956	Robert York	Louisville Times	"For his cartoon, 'Achilles' showing a bulging figure of American prosperity tapering to a weak heel labeled 'Farm Prices.'"
1957	Tom Little	The Nashville Tennessean	"For 'Wonder Why My Parents Didn't Give Me Salk Shots?' Published on January 12, 1956."
1958	Bruce M. Shanks	Buffalo Evening News	"For 'The Thinker,' published on August 10, 1957, depicting the dilemma of union membership when confronted by racketeering leaders in some labor unions."
1959	William H. (Bill) Mauldin	St. Louis Post-Dispatch	"For 'I won the Nobel Prize for Literature. What was your crime?' Published on October 30, 1958."
1960	No award given.		
1961	Carey Orr	Chicago Tribune	"For 'The Kindly Tiger,' published on October 8, 1960."
1962	Edmund S. Valtman	The Hartford Times	"For 'What You Need, Man, Is a Revolution Like Mine,' published on August 31, 1961."
1963	Frank Miller	Des Moines Register	"For a cartoon which showed a world destroyed with one ragged figure calling to another: 'I said we sure settled that dispute, didn't we!'"
1964	Paul Conrad	The Denver Post	"For his editorial cartooning during the past year"
1965	No award given.		
1966	Don Wright	The Miami News	"For 'You Mean You Were Bluffing?'"
1967	Patrick B. Oliphant	The Denver Post	"For 'They Won't Get Us To The Conference Table...Will They?' Published February 1, 1966."
1968	Eugene Gray Payne	The Charlotte Observer	"For his editorial cartooning in 1967."
1969	John Fischetti	Chicago Daily News	"For his editorial cartooning in 1968."
1970	Thomas F. Darcy	Newsday	"For his editorial cartooning during 1969."
1971	Paul Conrad	Los Angeles Times	"For his editorial cartooning during 1970."
1972	Jeffrey K. MacNelly	Richmond News-Leader	"For his editorial cartooning during 1971."
1973	No award given.		
1974	Paul Szep	The Boston Globe	"For his editorial cartooning during 1973."
1975	Garry Trudeau	Universal Press Syndicate	"For his cartoon strip Doonesbury."
1976	Tony Auth	The Philadelphia Inquirer	"For 'O beautiful for spacious skies, For amber waves of grain,' published on July 22, 1975."
1977	Paul Szep	The Boston Globe	
1978	Jeffrey K. MacNelly	Richmond News Leader	
1979	Herbert L. Block	The Washington Post	"For the body of his work."
1980	Don Wright	The Miami News	
1981	Mike Peters	Dayton Daily News	
1982	Ben Sargent	Austin American-Statesman	
1983	Richard Locher	Chicago Tribune	
1984	Paul Conrad	Los Angeles Times	
1985	Jeff MacNelly	Chicago Tribune	
1986	Jules Feiffer	The Village Voice	
1987	Berke Breathed	The Washington Post Writers Group	
1988	Doug Marlette	The Atlanta Constitution and Charlotte Observer	
1989	Jack Higgins	Chicago Sun-Times	
1990	Tom Toles	The Buffalo News	"For his work during the year as exemplified by the cartoon 'First Amendment.'"
1991	Jim Borgman	The Cincinnati Enquirer	
1992	Signe Wilkinson	The Philadelphia Daily News	
1993	Stephen R. Benson	The Arizona Republic	
1994	Michael P. Ramirez	Commercial Appeal	"For his trenchant cartoons on contemporary issues."
1995	Mike Luckovich	The Atlanta Constitution	
1996	Jim Morin	The Miami Herald	
1997	Walt Handelsman	Times-Picayune	
1998	Stephen P. Breen	Asbury Park Press	
1999	David Horsey	The Seattle Post-Intelligencer	
2000	Joel Pett	Lexington Herald-Leader	
2001	Ann Telnaes	Los Angeles Times Syndicate	
2002	Clay Bennett	The Christian Science Monitor	
2003	David Horsey	The Seattle Post-Intelligencer	"For his perceptive cartoons executed with a distinctive style and sense of humor."
2004	Matt Davies	The Journal News	"For his piercing cartoons on an array of topics, drawn with a fresh, original style."
2005	Nick Anderson	The Courier-Journal	"For his unusual graphic style that produced extraordinarily thoughtful and powerful messages."
2006	Mike Luckovich	The Atlanta Journal-Constitution	"For his powerful cartoons on an array of issues, drawn with a simple but piercing style."
2007	Walt Handelsman	Newsday	"For his stark, sophisticated cartoons and his impressive use of zany animation."
2008	Michael Ramirez	Investor's Business Daily	"For his provocative cartoons that rely on originality, humor and detailed artistry."
2009	Steve Breen	The San Diego Union-Tribune	"For his agile use of a classic style to produce wide ranging cartoons that engage readers with power, clarity and humor."
2010	Mark Fiore	Self-syndicated; appearing on SFGate.com	"For his animated cartoons appearing on SFGate.com, the San Francisco Chronicle Web site, where his biting wit, extensive research and ability to distill complex issues set a high standard for an emerging form of commentary."
2011	Mike Keefe	The Denver Post	"For his widely ranging cartoons that employ a loose, expressive style to send strong, witty messages."
2012	Matt Wuerker	Politico	"For his consistently fresh, funny cartoons, especially memorable for lampooning the partisan conflict that engulfed Washington."
2013	Steve Sack	Star Tribune	"For his diverse collection of cartoons, using an original style and clever ideas to drive home his unmistakable point of view."
2014	Kevin Siers	The Charlotte Observer	"For his thought provoking cartoons drawn with a sharp wit and bold artistic style."
2015	Adam Zyglis	The Buffalo News	"Who used strong images to connect with readers while conveying layers of meaning in a few words."
2016	Jack Ohman	The Sacramento Bee	"For cartoons that convey wry, rueful perspectives through sophisticated style that combines bold line work with subtle colors and textures."
2017	Jim Morin	Miami Herald	"For editorial cartoons that delivered sharp perspectives through flawless artistry, biting prose and crisp wit."
2018	Jake Halpern and Michael Sloan	The New York Times	"For an emotionally powerful series, told in graphic narrative form, that chronicled the daily struggles of a real-life family of refugees and its fear of deportation."
2019	Darrin Bell	Freelancer	"For beautiful and daring editorial cartoons that took on issues affecting disenfranchised communities, calling out lies, hypocrisy and fraud in the political turmoil surrounding the Trump administration."
2020	Barry Blitt	The New Yorker	"For work that skewers the personalities and policies emanating from the Trump White House with deceptively sweet watercolor style and seemingly gentle caricatures."
2021	No award given.		
2022	Fahmida Azim, Anthony Del Col, Walt Hickey and Josh Adams	Insider	"For using graphic reportage and the comics medium to tell a powerful yet intimate story of the Chinese oppression of the Uyghurs, making the issue accessible to a wider public."
2023	Mona Chalabi	The New York Times	"For striking illustrations that combine statistical reporting with keen analysis to help readers understand the immense wealth and economic power of Amazon founder Jeff Bezos."
2024	Medar de la Cruz	The New Yorker	"For his visually-driven story set inside Rikers Island jail using bold black-and-white images that humanize the prisoners and staff through their hunger for books."
2025	Ann Telnaes	The Washington Post	"For delivering piercing commentary on powerful people and institutions with deftness, creativity—and a fearlessness that led to her departure from the news organization after 17 years."
2026	Natalie Obiko Pearson	Bloomberg News	"For “trAPPed,” a riveting account of a neurologist in India held under “digital arrest” by her phone, reporting that uses visuals and words to cast light on the growing global challenges of surveillance and digital scams."
2026	Anand RK	Bloomberg News	"For “trAPPed,” a riveting account of a neurologist in India held under “digital arrest” by her phone, reporting that uses visuals and words to cast light on the growing global challenges of surveillance and digital scams."
2026	Suparna Sharma	Bloomberg News	"For “trAPPed,” a riveting account of a neurologist in India held under “digital arrest” by her phone, reporting that uses visuals and words to cast light on the growing global challenges of surveillance and digital scams."

== Repeat winners ==
Through 2017, eighteen people have won the Editorial Cartooning Pulitzer twice, and five of those have won it three times.

Name	No.	Years won
Rollin Kirby	3	1922, 1925, 1929
Edmund Duffy	3	1931, 1934, 1940
Herbert L. Block	3	1942, 1954, 1979
Paul Conrad	3	1964, 1971, 1984
Jeff MacNelly	3	1972, 1978, 1985
Jay Norwood Darling	2	1924, 1943
Daniel R. Fitzpatrick	2	1926, 1955
Nelson Harding	2	1927, 1928
Vaughn Shoemaker	2	1938, 1947
Bill Mauldin	2	1945, 1959
Don Wright	2	1966, 1980
Paul Szep	2	1974, 1977
Michael Ramirez	2	1994, 2008
Mike Luckovich	2	1995, 2006
Jim Morin	2	1996, 2017
Walt Handelsman	2	1997, 2007
Steve Breen	2	1998, 2009
David Horsey	2	1999, 2003

Nelson Harding is the only cartoonist to have won the prize in two consecutive years, 1927 and 1928.
