= 1928 Pulitzer Prize =

Awards for journalism and related fields

The following are the Pulitzer Prizes for 1928.

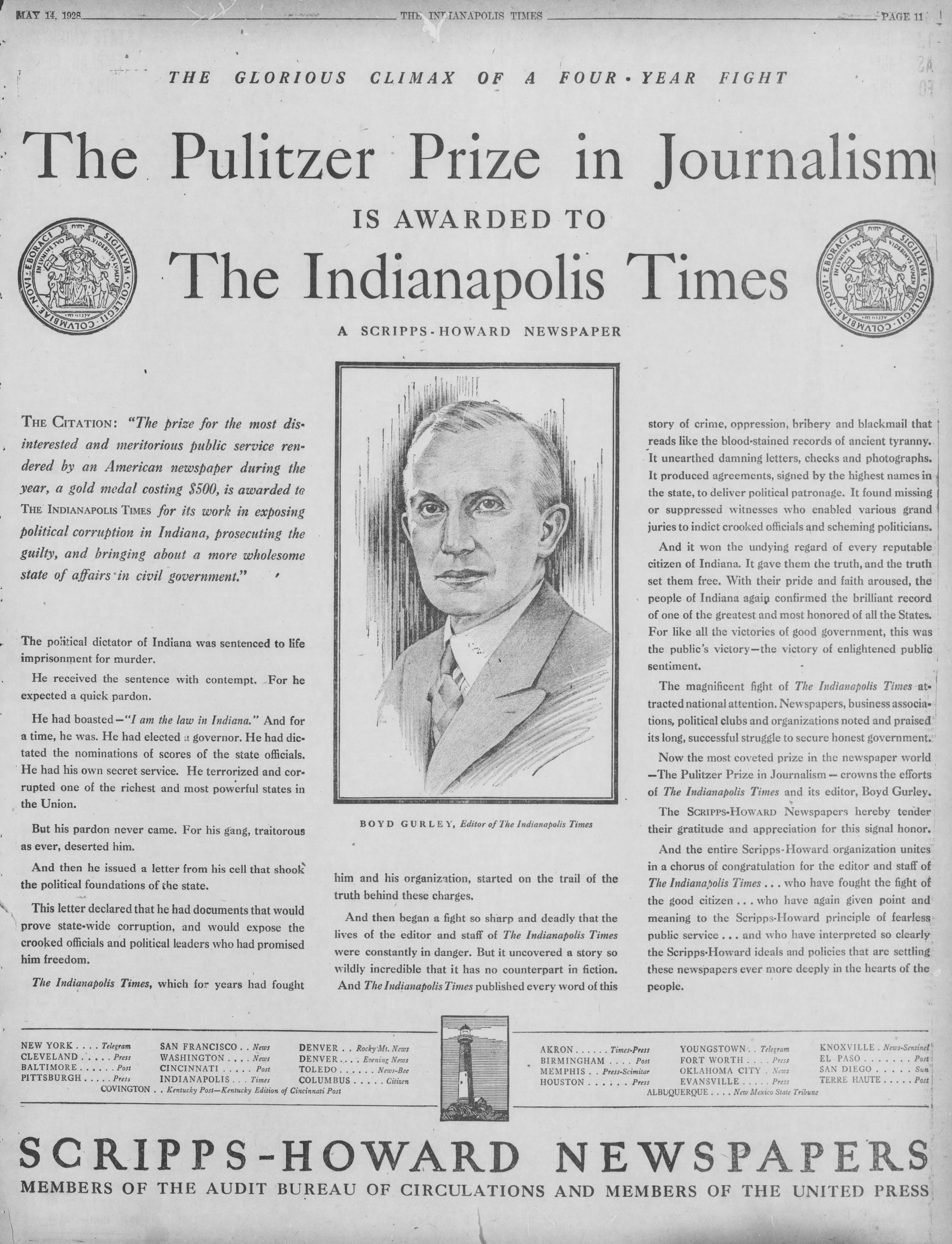
The Indianapolis Times received the prize for Public Service.

== Journalism awards ==
- Public Service:
  - The Indianapolis Times, "for its work in exposing political corruption to Indiana, prosecuting the guilty and bringing about a more wholesome state of affairs in civil government". The prize recognized the Times's investigation of Ku Klux Klan connections among city and state officials, including Governor Ed Jackson.
- Reporting:
  - No award given
- Editorial Writing:
  - Grover Cleveland Hall of The Montgomery Advertiser, for his editorials against gangsterism, floggings and racial and religious intolerance. "The Advertiser waged war against the resurgent Ku Klux Klan", the paper says today.

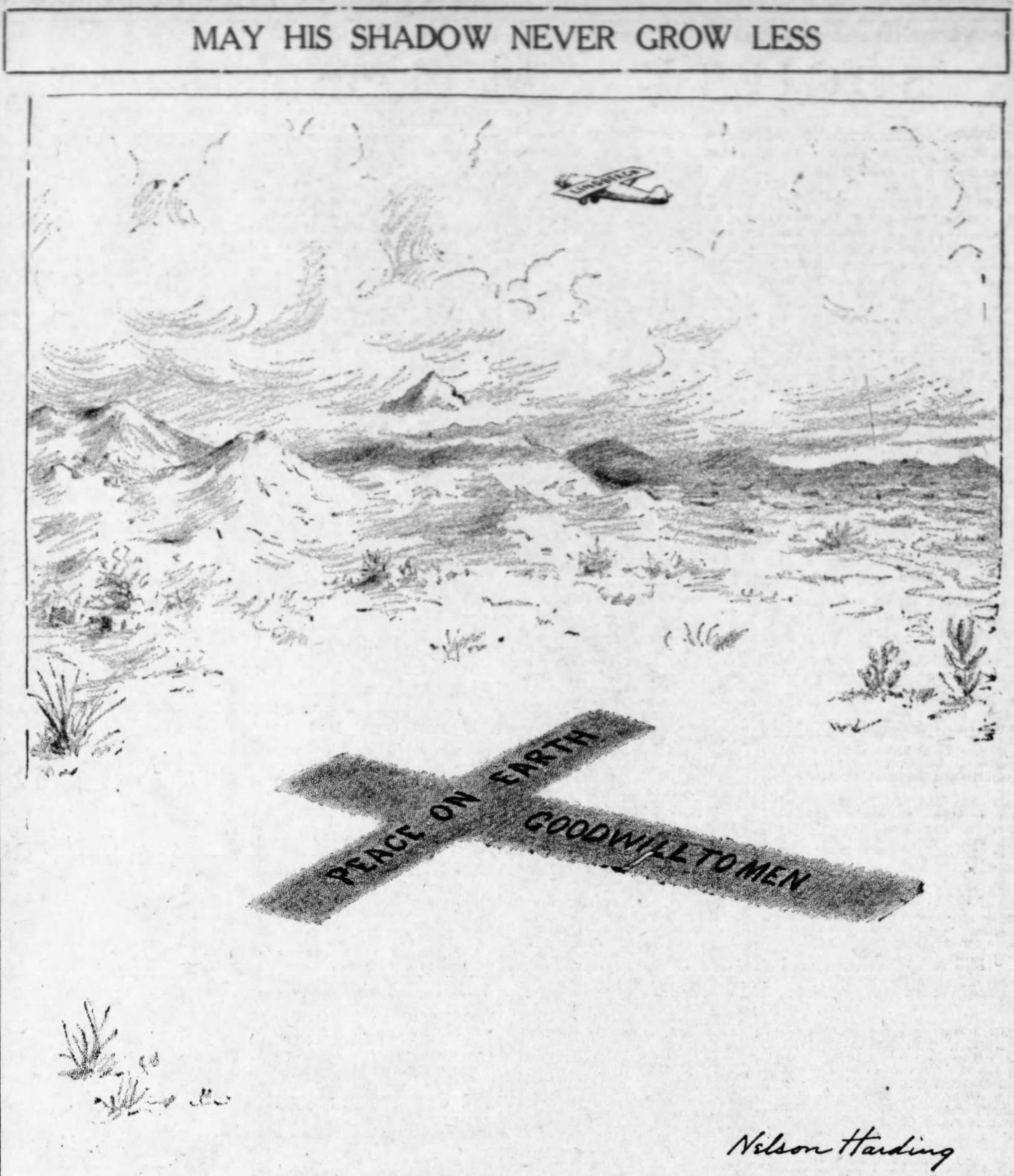
"May His Shadow Never Grow Less", the winning editorial cartoon, which pays tribute to Charles Lindbergh's goodwill tour of Latin America

- Editorial Cartooning:
  - Nelson Harding of the Brooklyn Daily Eagle, "May His Shadow Never Grow Less."

== Letters and Drama Awards ==
- Novel:
  - The Bridge of San Luis Rey by Thornton Wilder (Boni)
- Drama:
  - Strange Interlude by Eugene O'Neill (Boni)
- History:
  - Main Currents in American Thought, 2 vols. by Vernon Louis Parrington (Harcourt)
- Biography or Autobiography:
  - The American Orchestra and Theodore Thomas by Charles Edward Russell (Doubleday)
- Poetry:
  - Tristram by Edwin Arlington Robinson (Macmillan)
