= Bruce Shanks =

American cartoonist

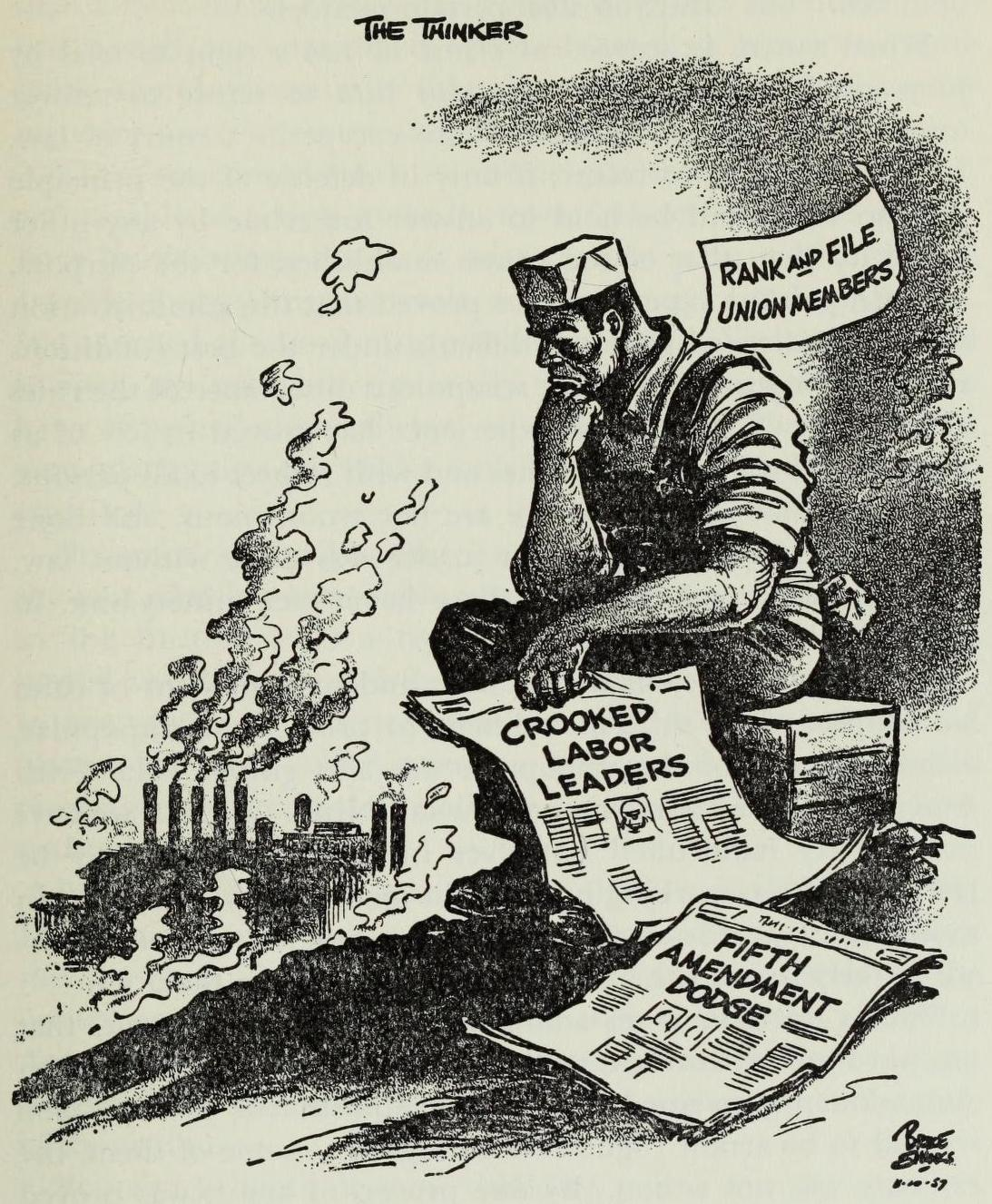
"The Thinker", for which Shanks received the 1958 Pulitzer Prize for Editorial Cartooning

Bruce McKinley Shanks (January 29, 1908 – April 12, 1980) was an American editorial cartoonist who worked for the Buffalo Evening News during the middle of the 20th century. There he won the annual Pulitzer Prize for Editorial Cartooning for "The Thinker" (August 10, 1957), which showed "the dilemma of union membership when confronted by corrupt leaders in some labor unions".

Shanks was born in Buffalo, New York, the son of George Shanks, who owned a local sign painting business. From 1924 to 1927, he attended Lafayette High School, where he was taught by art instructor Elizabeth Weiffenbach, who later (1936-1939) also influenced the style of science-fiction cover artist Kelly Freas. Shanks began his employment with the Buffalo Evening News as a copy boy. His first cartoons appeared in the sports pages.

One character created by Shanks was Olaf Fub, a name derived from "Buffalo" spelled backward. A drawing of Fub and the phrase, "Olaf Fub sez ..." continued to introduce the commentary of Evening News writers on local events even well after Shanks' death.

Another character who appeared frequently in Shanks' editorial cartoons was John Q. Public. That name was created by Vaughn Shoemaker, another editorial cartoonist, and is now a placeholder name in the United States. Shanks' cartoons were widely distributed by syndicators throughout the U.S. and the world at the height of his career, so he may have contributed to the establishment of the placeholder.

Beside the Pulitzer, Shanks won eight Freedoms Foundation awards and several Page One Awards from the American Newspaper Guild.

During World War II, Shanks served in the U.S. Army from 1942 to 1945. He died in Palm Beach, Florida in 1980.
