= Frank Miller (editorial cartoonist) =

American cartoonist

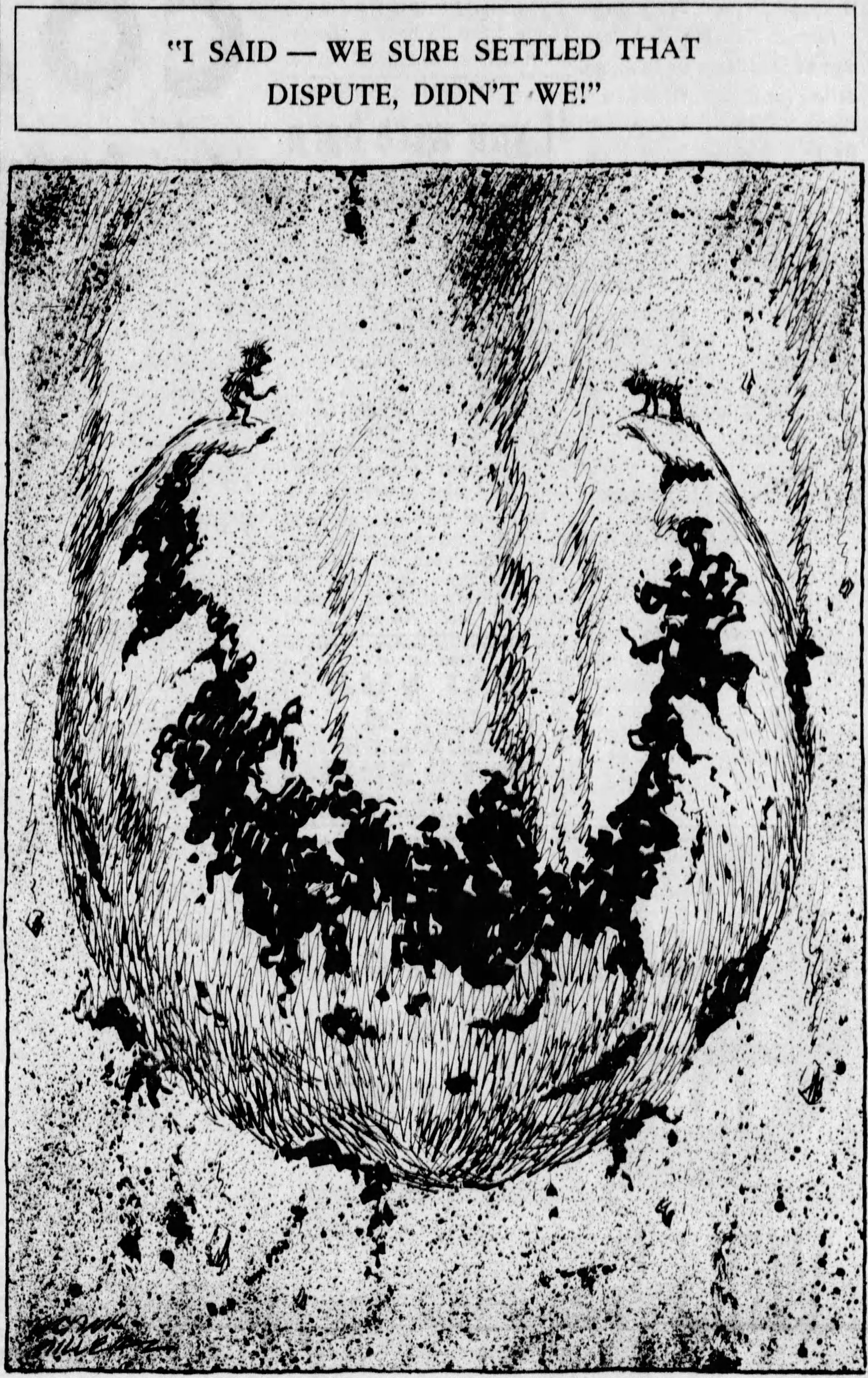
Miller's Pulitzer Prize-winning cartoon, "I said—We sure settled that dispute, didn't we!"

Frank Andrea Miller (March 28, 1925 – February 17, 1983) was an American editorial cartoonist. He was a cartoonist for the Des Moines Register from 1953 to 1983. In 1963, Miller received the Pulitzer Prize for Editorial Cartooning for his notable editorial cartoon on nuclear warfare which depicts a world destroyed and one ragged figure saying to another, "I said—we sure settled that dispute, didn't we!"

== Awards ==
- 1953 - National Headliner Award
- 1963 - Pulitzer Prize for Editorial Cartooning

== Publications ==
- Miller, Frank. Frank Miller Looks At Life, Des Moines Register, 1962.
- Miller, Frank. Cartoons as Commentary: Three Decades at the Register, Des Moines Register, 1983.
- Miller, Frank & Miller, Mindy. "Portraits of Alcoholism, "Plain Talk Publishing, Des Moines, 1988.
