= Jack Higgins (cartoonist) =

American cartoonist (1954–2024)

- Born: John Joseph Higgins; August 19, 1954; Chicago, Illinois, U.S.
- Died: February 10, 2024 (aged 69)
- Education: College of the Holy Cross (BA)
- Occupation: Cartoonist
- Notable work: Editorial cartoons
- Spouse: Missy Higgins
- Children: 6
- Parents: Maurice Higgins (father); Helen Higgins (mother)
- Awards: Pulitzer Prize for Editorial Cartooning (1993, 1995, 2007, 2009)

John Joseph Higgins (August 19, 1954 – February 10, 2024) was an American editorial cartoonist for the Chicago Sun-Times. He received the Pulitzer Prize for Editorial Cartooning in 1989.

== Early life and career ==
Jack Higgins was born in Chicago on August 19, 1954. He graduated from St. Ignatius College Prep and the College of the Holy Cross with a B.A. in Economics.

Higgins began editorial cartooning for its student newspaper before he started freelancing for the Chicago Sun-Times. He became a full-time cartoonist for the paper in 1981. Higgins was a finalist for the Pulitzer Prize for Editorial Cartooning in 1986; he won in 1989.

Higgins was for many years syndicated through Universal Press Syndicate. He ceased syndication in July 2007, opting to create more local cartoons for his paper.

== Death ==
Higgins died after a long illness on February 10, 2024, at the age of 69.

== Awards ==
- 1984, 1987, 1992, 1994, 1996, 1997, 1998, 1999, 2000, 2001, 2003:
  - Peter Lisagor Award, Society of Professional Journalists
- 1986:
  - Pulitzer Prize Finalist for Editorial Cartooning
- 1987:
  - Award for Outstanding Commentary, Chicago Association of Black Journalists
- 1988:
  - Sigma Delta Chi Award for Editorial Cartooning
  - International Salon of Cartoons, First Prize
- 1989:
  - Pulitzer Prize for Editorial Cartooning
- 1993, 1995, 2007, 2009:
  - Herman Kogan Award, Chicago Bar Association
- 1994:
  - Robert F. Kennedy Award finalist
- 1996:
  - Illinois Journalist of the Year
- 1997:
  - The Best of the Press, Illinois Press Association
- 1998:
  - Sigma Delta Chi Award for Editorial Cartooning
  - John Fischetti Award
- 2000:
  - The Best of the Press, Illinois Press Association
- 2004:
  - College of the Holy Cross - Sanctae Crucis Award
