= Ross A. Lewis =

American cartoonist

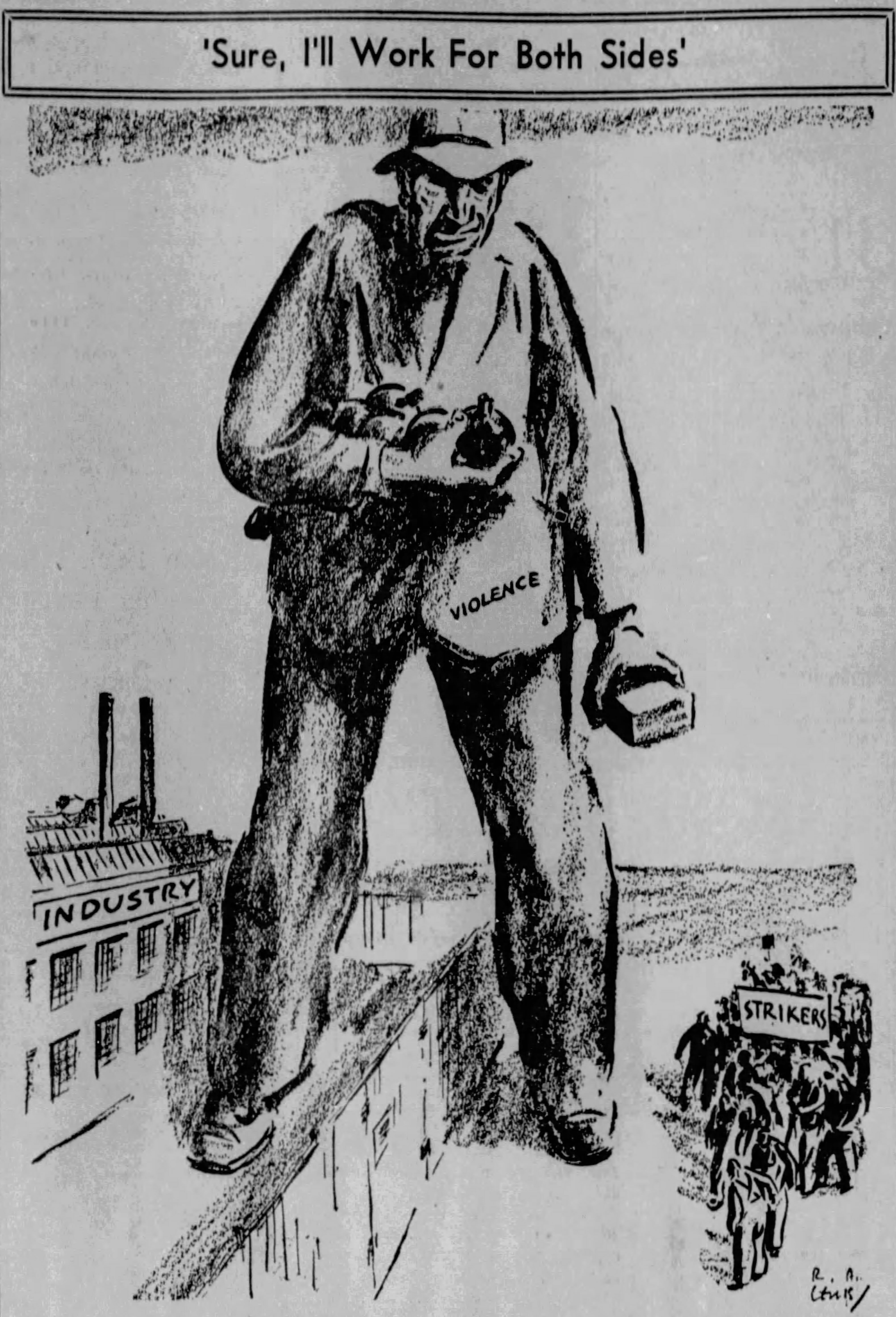
"Sure, I'll Work for Both Sides", Lewis's Pulitzer Prize-winning cartoon

Ross Aubrey Lewis (November 9, 1902 – August 6, 1977) was an American editorial cartoonist who received the 1935 Pulitzer Prize for Editorial Cartooning. Lewis was born in Metamora, Michigan and graduated from Milwaukee State College in 1923.
