= Mike Luckovich =

American cartoonist (born 1960)

- Born: Michael Edward Luckovich; January 28, 1960 (age 66) Seattle, Washington, U.S.
- Area: Cartoonist
- Notable works: Editorial cartoons
- Awards: See full list

Michael Edward Luckovich (/ˈlʌkəvɪtʃ/ LUK-ə-vitch; born January 28, 1960) is an editorial cartoonist who has worked for The Atlanta Journal-Constitution since 1989. He is the 2005 winner of the Reuben, the National Cartoonists Society's top award for cartoonist of the year, and is the recipient of two Pulitzer Prizes.

== Early life ==
Luckovich was born in Seattle, Washington, attended Bishop Kelly High School in Boise, Idaho, before transferring to Sheldon High School in Eugene, Oregon, and graduated in 1982 from the University of Washington with a degree in political science. While a student at UW, he was "one of two non-Jewish members of ZBT frat" on the campus. For two years after graduation, he sold cartoons on a freelance basis to the Everett, Washington, newspaper while working as an insurance salesman.

== Career ==
Luckovich began his career with The Greenville News (South Carolina) in 1984 and moved to the New Orleans Times-Picayune later that year. In 1989 he began his career with the Atlanta Journal-Constitution, which continues to today. In 2000, Luckovich started his comic strip "SuperZeros" about a pair of dim-witted superheroes. It was distributed by Tribune Media Service and lasted a year.

In a September 2001 interview, Luckovich commented on his style of cartooning and how it changed after the 9/11 terrorist attacks:

Normally with my cartoons I try to use humor to get across my point. After Sept. 11th, you just couldn't use humor. The tragedy was so enormous, you couldn't be funny. It's almost like you have to come up with cartoons using a different part of your brain. I was just trying to come up with images that expressed the emotions that I was feeling and tried to focus in on different aspects of the tragedy that I thought were important.

In the same interview Luckovich cited Jeff MacNelly as his "biggest editorial cartoonist role model" and Mort Drucker as his "first hero".

== Awards ==
While at the Atlanta Journal-Constitution, Mike Luckovich won several awards. He won the 1995 Pulitzer Prize and 2006 Pulitzer Prize for Editorial Cartooning. He received the National Cartoonists Society Editorial Cartoon Award for 2001, with additional nominations for 1998 and 2002. He won the 2008 National Journalism Awards, for Editorial Cartooning. In 2018, he received the Advancing American Democracy Award by the Benjamin Harrison Presidential Site.

== Controversy ==
Luckovich attracted a great deal of backlash when the newspaper cartoonist drew a cartoon depicting Michael Jackson's death one day after his death. The comic strip illustrated the leaders Heaven and Hell flipping a coin to see what would be the late King of Pop's final destination would be after his death. Many people, including Jackson's family, friends, and fans deemed the cartoon offensive.

== Books ==
- Lotsa Luckovich (Pocket, 1996) ISBN 978-0-671-54519-2
- Four More Wars! (ECW Press, 2006) ISBN 978-1-55022-737-6
- A Very Stable Genius! (ECW Press, 2018) ISBN 978-1-77041-478-5
