= David Horsey =

American cartoonist

- Born: 1951 (age 74–75); Evansville, Indiana, U.S.
- Education: University of Washington; University of Kent
- Occupation: Cartoonist

David Horsey (born 1951) is an American editorial cartoonist and commentator. His cartoons appeared in the Seattle Post-Intelligencer from 1979 until December 2011 and in the Los Angeles Times since that time. His cartoons are syndicated to newspapers nationwide by Tribune Content Agency. He won the Pulitzer Prize for Editorial Cartooning in 1999 and 2003.

== Life and career ==
Horsey was born in Evansville, Indiana and moved to Seattle, Washington at age 3. He began working as a cartoonist in the Cascade, the school newspaper at Ingraham High School. He was a French horn player in the Seattle Youth Symphony. He attended the University of Washington, where, as a freshman, he became the editorial cartoonist of the student newspaper The Daily. He went on to become the first editorial cartoonist to be chosen as editor-in-chief of The Daily. He graduated in 1976 with a degree in communication studies.

Horsey's first job was as a reporter for the Bellevue Journal-American, but in 1979 he was hired to be the editorial cartoonist of the Post-Intelligencer. In 1986, he earned a master's degree in international relations from the University of Kent in England. In 2004 he received an honorary doctorate degree from Seattle University.

At the end of 2011, he left the Post-Intelligencer and went to work for the Los Angeles Times, where he remained until January 2018. His work then appeared in the Seattle Times until July 2018. He currently works for the Tribune Content Agency.

Horsey has been recognized for his work with the Pulitzer Prize for Editorial Cartooning, first in 1999, when many of his cartoons focused on the Monica Lewinsky scandal, and in 2003, when he lampooned the Bush administration. In 2014, he was again a finalist for the Pulitzer Prize and also received the Robert F. Kennedy Journalism Award for his cartoons related to social justice issues.

== Collections ==
- Politics and Other Perversions: A Book of Political Cartoons by Dave Horsey (Shambala Publications Group, Seattle 1974)
- Horsey's Rude Awakenings (Madrona Publishers, Seattle 1981)
- Horsey's Greatest Hits of the '80s (Seattle Post-Intelligencer, Seattle 1989)
- The Fall of Man (Seattle Post-Intelligencer, Seattle 1994)
- One Man Show (Seattle Post-Intelligencer, Seattle 1999)
- From Hanging Chad to Baghdad (Seattle Post-Intelligencer, Seattle 2003)
- Draw Quick, Shoot Straight (Seattle Post-Intelligencer, Seattle 2007)
- Refuge of Scoundrels (CreateSpace Independent Publishing Platform 2013)

== Sarah Huckabee apology ==
In November 2017, Horsey wrote an entry for his thrice-weekly column, Top of the Ticket, in the Los Angeles Times titled "Sarah Huckabee Sanders is the right mouthpiece for a truth-twisting president" and was criticized shortly thereafter for his disparaging remarks about the appearance of Donald Trump's press secretary, Sarah Huckabee Sanders. Horsey's column included criticisms of her looks and attire. After being criticized for his comments, Horsey updated his column with an apology and removed the comments about Huckabee.
