= Walt Handelsman =

American cartoonist

Walt Handelsman (born December 3, 1956, in Baltimore, Maryland) is an editorial cartoonist for The Advocate in New Orleans. His cartoons are syndicated by Tribune Content Agency. He has twice won the Pulitzer Prize for Editorial Cartooning, in 1997 with the Times-Picayune and in 2007 for Newsday.

== Biography ==
Handelsman graduated from Dean College (Franklin, MA) with an associate degree in Art Therapy in 1977; and the University of Cincinnati in 1979. He began his professional career at a chain of 13 Baltimore, Maryland and Washington, D.C., suburban weeklies from 1982 to 1985, followed by positions at The Scranton Times of Scranton, Pennsylvania, from 1985 to 1989, and The Times-Picayune in New Orleans, Louisiana, from 1989 to 2001, whereupon he joined Newsday, based on Long Island, New York. In 2013 he left Newsday to return to New Orleans with The Advocate, which had recently expanded its coverage to include New Orleans as well as its original home in Baton Rouge, Louisiana. In December 2025, Handelsman announced his retirement effective the end of 2025.

He is the author of seven collections of his editorial cartoons as well as a children's book published in 1995.

He is the brother of NBC news correspondent, Steve Handelsman.

== Awards ==
Handelsman has won many local and national awards for cartooning excellence, including two Pulitzer Prizes, two National Headliner Awards, the Society of Professional Journalists Award, the Robert F. Kennedy Journalism Award and 2003 Scripps Howard National Journalism Awards.
