= Thomas F. Darcy =

American cartoonist

- Born: December 19, 1932 Brooklyn, New York
- Died: December 6, 2000 (aged 67) East Meadow, New York
- Area: Editorial cartoonist
- Awards: Pulitzer Prize for Editorial Cartooning, 1970

"Good news, we've turned the corner in Vietnam!"

Thomas Francis Darcy (December 19, 1932 – December 6, 2000) was an American political cartoonist. While working at Newsday, he won the 1970 Pulitzer Prize for Editorial Cartooning.

Thomas was born in the Brooklyn borough of New York City and served in the U.S. Navy from 1951 to 1953. He attended the Terry Art Institute in Florida from 1953 to 1954 and graduated from the Cartoonists and Illustrators School (now the School of Visual Arts) in New York in 1956, where he studied under Jack Markow and Burne Hogarth. He started at Newsday in 1956 in the advertising department and became a cartoonist for the paper the following year. He left for the Phoenix Gazette in 1959, but he was too liberal for that newspaper, so the next year he headed back east to become an art director for the advertising agency Lenhart & Altschuler. He returned to editorial cartooning with brief stints at the Houston Post (1965-1966) and the Philadelphia Bulletin (1966-1968).

Publisher Bill Moyers brought Darcy back to Newsday, where he would remain until his retirement 1997. Moyers gave him the "latitude" he needed to work. According to the New York Times, he "was the first in a new wave of editorial cartoonists, who abandoned stylized cartooning and went straight for the jugular." He said that his work was "not for the amusement of the comfortable" and that "If it's big and struts through the door, hit it hard." In the World Encyclopedia of Cartoons, Rick Marschall compared Darcy to Herblock and Paul Conrad, noting his bold lines and his use of "facial expressions and emotions to advantage in depicting his characters."

His Pulitzer submissions primarily concerned the Vietnam War and inner-city problems. He drew a cartoon featuring an L-shaped coffin over which a general exclaims "Good news, we've turned the corner in Vietnam!" In other cartoons, Darcy featured President Richard Nixon grabbing the White House columns as if they were jail bars, captioned "Prisoner of War," and another featuring two robed street prophets about to collide, carrying signs reading "Doomsday Is Coming!" and "The Mideast Is Here!" In addition to the Pulitzer, Darcy also won the Thomas Nast Award from the Overseas Press Club in 1970 and 1972 and a National Headliner Award.

In 1977, Darcy left editorial cartooning and created a weekly page of social commentary and reporting called "Tom Darcy on Long Island". He said "After Nixon, Vietnam and civil rights, what's left to attack? I had too much of the sixties and seventies." In 1986, he was one of nine Pulitzer winners and over fifty cartoonists to participate in a collective protest, publishing cartoons against war-oriented toys during the Christmas shopping season.
