= Daniel R. Fitzpatrick =

American cartoonist

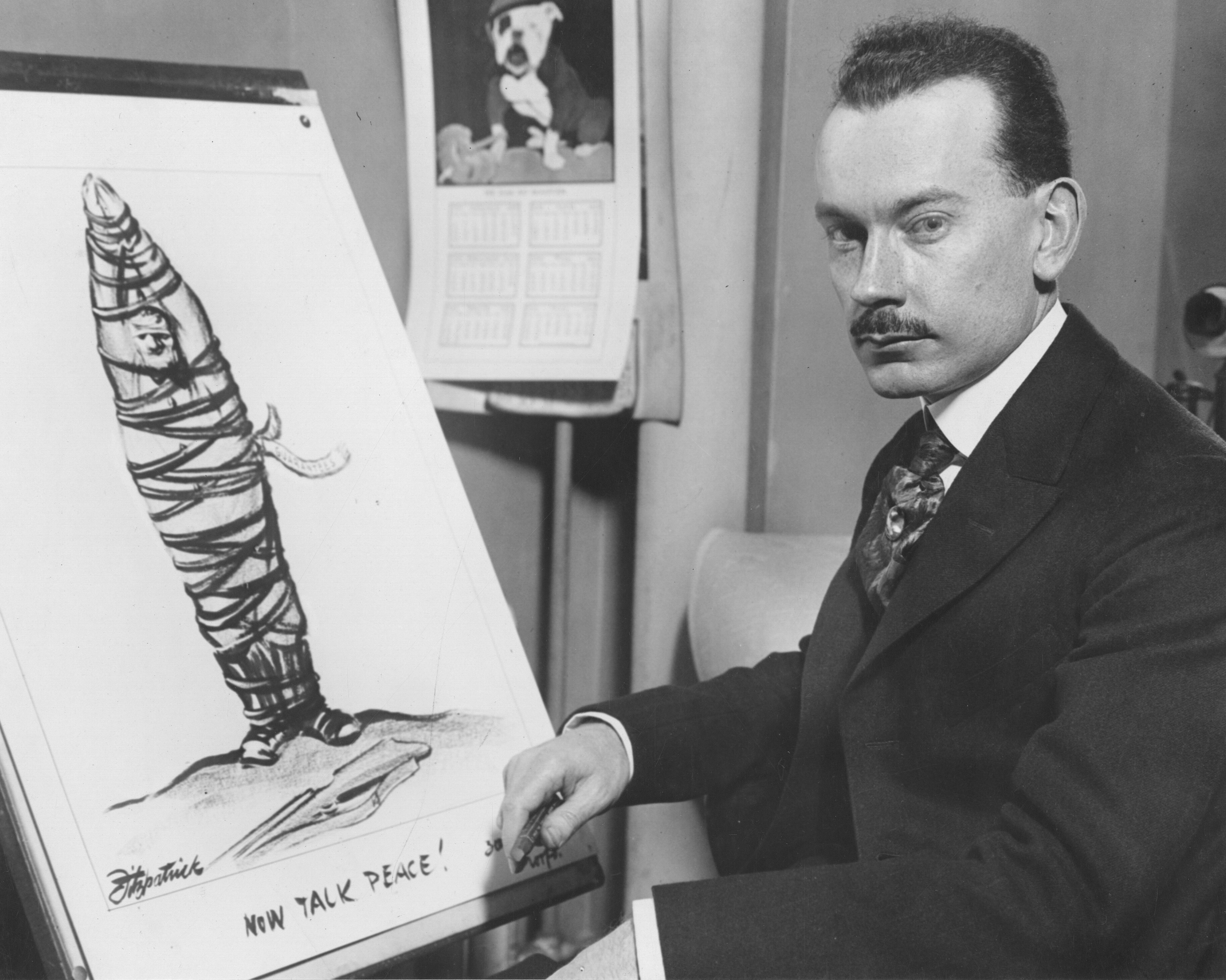
- Fitzpatrick in 1919
- Born: March 5, 1891; Superior, Wisconsin
- Died: May 18, 1969 (aged 78)
- Education: Art Institute of Chicago
- Occupation: Editorial cartoonist

Daniel Robert Fitzpatrick (March 5, 1891 – May 18, 1969) was a two-time Pulitzer Prize winner and an editorial cartoonist for the St. Louis Post-Dispatch from 1913 to 1958.

== Biography ==
Fitzpatrick was born in Superior, Wisconsin. He studied at the Art Institute of Chicago. From 1911 to 1912 he worked as a staff artist and cartoonist at the Chicago Daily News. Joining the St. Louis Post-Dispatch in 1913, Fitzpatrick served as its editorial cartoonist until 1958.

His work and actions received criticism. In 1940 the cartoonist and several other Post-Dispatch staff members were cited with contempt of court because they criticized the dismissal of an extortion suit against a state representative. Fitzpatrick received a ten-day sentence and a $100 fine.

During his lifetime, Fitzpatrick saw cartoons exhibited at the St. Louis Art Museum as well as the Moscow Museum of Modern Western Painting. In the spring of 1941 the New York City's Associated American Artists Gallery held its second exhibition of Fitzpatrick's cartoons.

Washington University in St. Louis presented Fitzpatrick the honorary degree of Doctor of Letters in 1949. Fitzpatrick died on May 18, 1969.

His papers are held at the State Historical Society of Missouri.

== Awards ==
- 1954 The Hillman Prize
- 1926; 1954 Pulitzer Prize for Editorial Cartooning, for his cartoon "The Laws of Moses and the Laws of Today" in the St. Louis Post-Dispatch on April 12, 1926, (the cartoon is known for representing disapproval of the rapid increase of laws and legislation compared to the few laws enacted by Moses); in 1955, for his June 8, 1954 cartoon "How Would Another Mistake Help?" It would not. This particular cartoon was about the French and possible U.S. involvement in Indochina.
- 1958 Missouri Honor Medal for Distinguished Service in Journalism

== Museum collections ==
- Editorial Cartoon Collection | Missouri State Historical Society
- War Cartoons by Daniel R. Fitzpatrick | Saint Louis Art Museum
- 20th Century Cave Man and Had I The Food You Waste | The Cleveland Museum of Art

== Works ==
- As I saw it: a review of our times with 311 cartoons and notes, Simon and Schuster, 1953

== Gallery ==
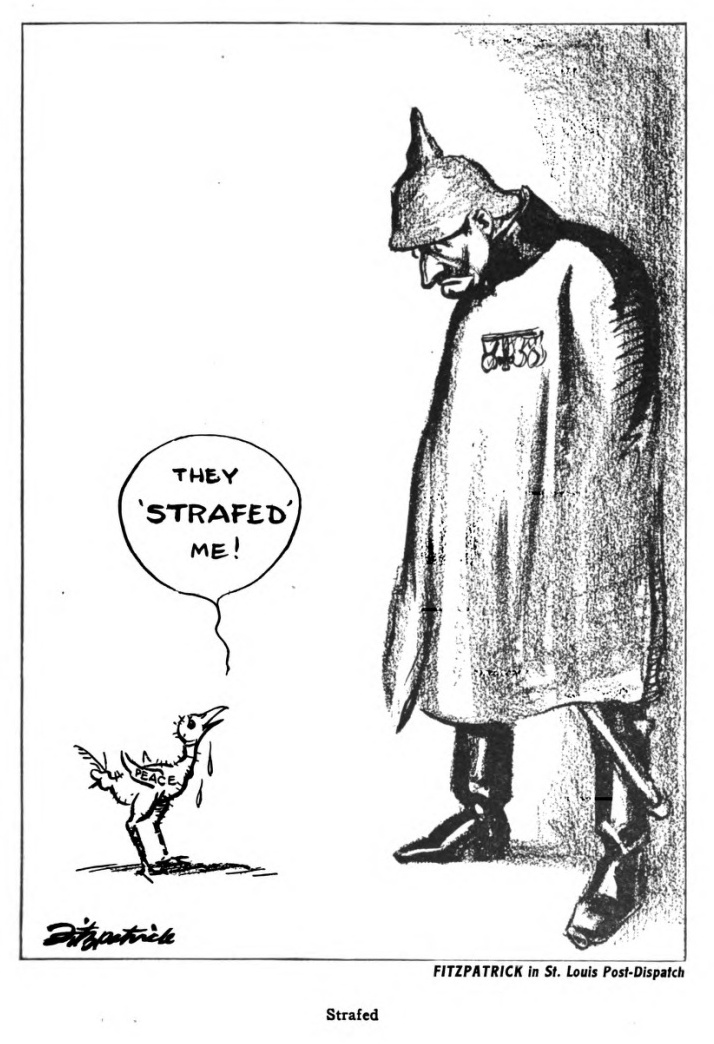
"Strafed" (1917)

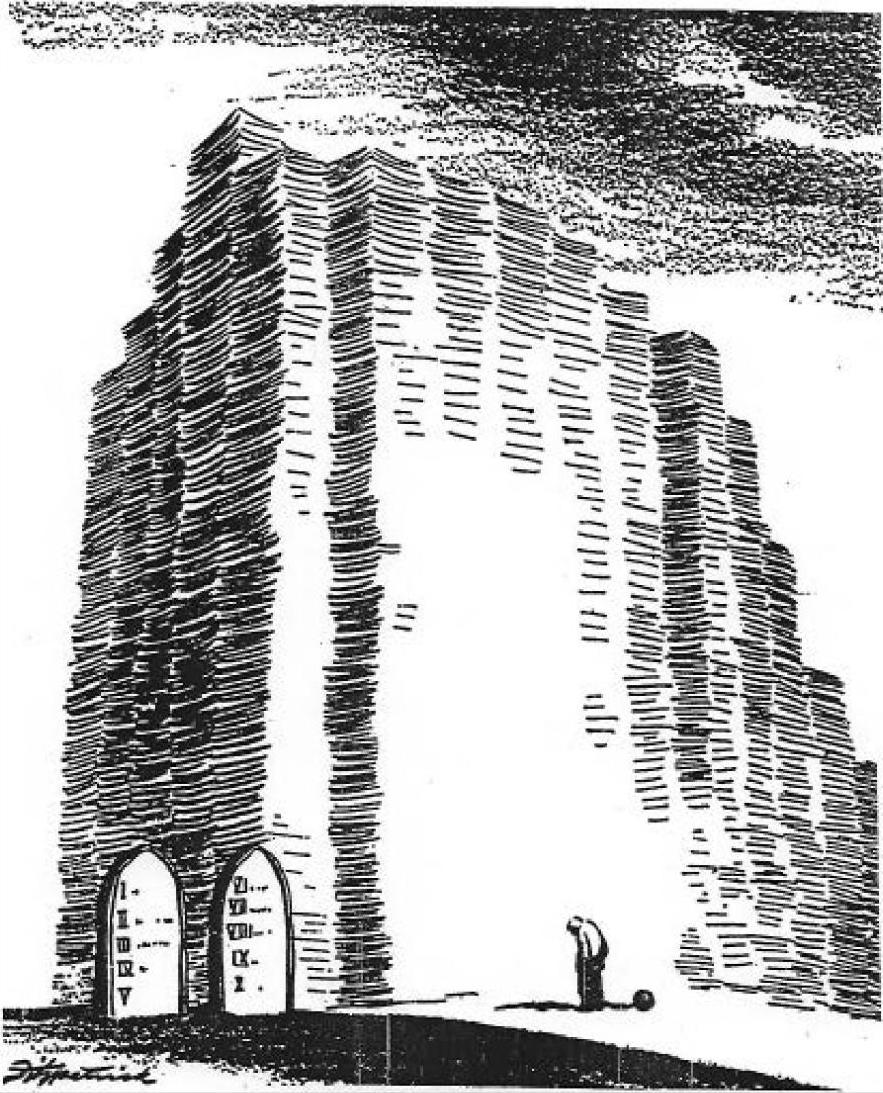
"The Laws of Moses and the Laws of Today", winner of the 1926 Pulitzer Prize

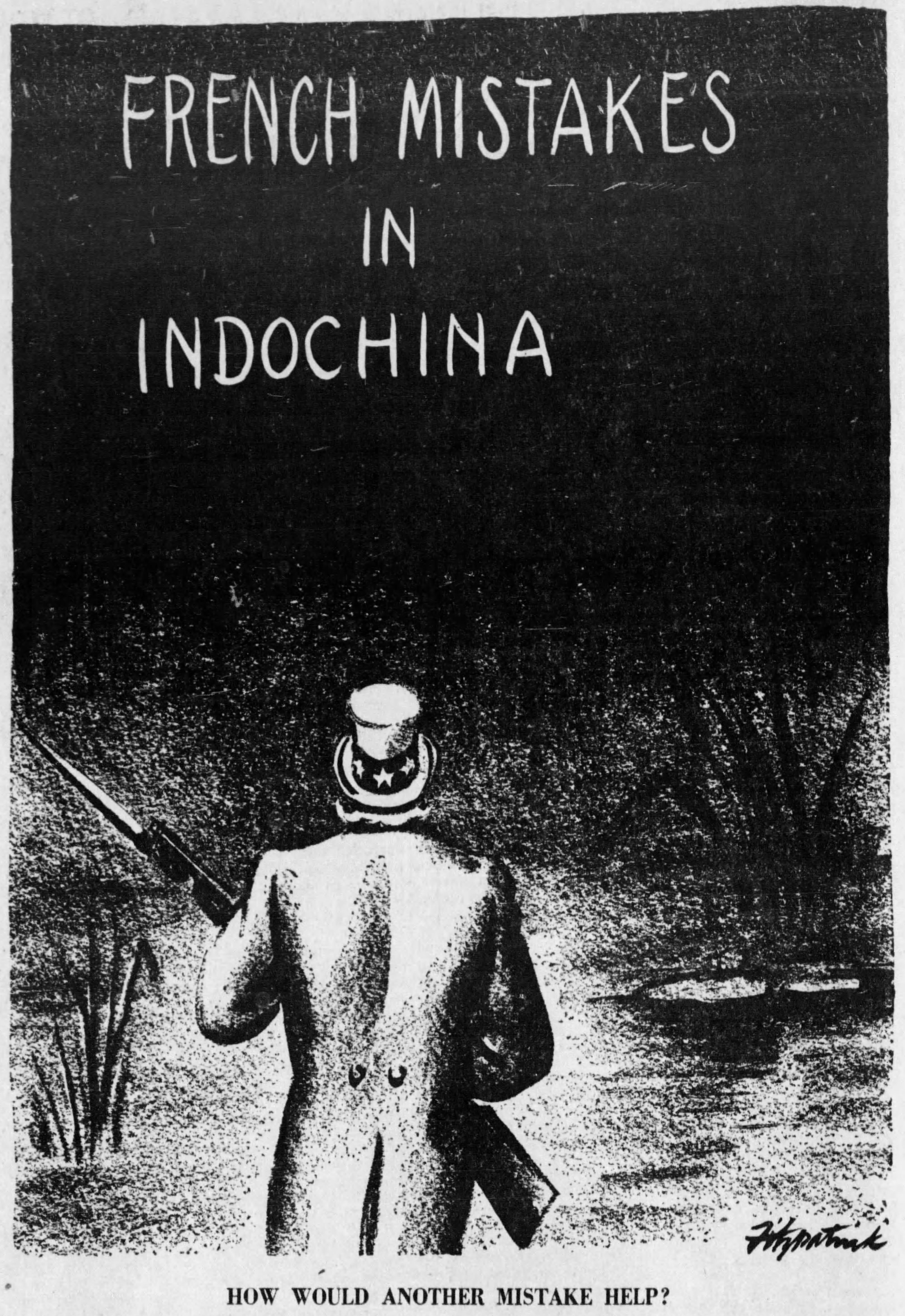
"How Would Another Mistake Help", winner of the 1955 Pulitzer Prize
