= Walt Hickey =

American data journalist and editor

- Education: College of William & Mary
- Occupations: Journalist; editor; author
- Notable work: Numlock News; You Are What You Watch (2023)
- Awards: Pulitzer Prize for Illustrated Reporting and Commentary (2022)

Walter Hickey, who publishes as Walt Hickey, is an American data journalist and editor. In 2022 he shared the Pulitzer Prize for Illustrated Reporting and Commentary with Fahmida Azim, Anthony Del Col and Josh Adams for a work of comics journalism published by Insider about the detention of Uyghurs in China. He writes the daily newsletter Numlock News and is the author of the book You Are What You Watch. After more than a decade at Business Insider and FiveThirtyEight, he became executive editor of Sherwood, the media operation of Robinhood Markets, in 2024.

== Early life and education ==
Hickey was born in New York and went to an all-boys Catholic secondary school in New Jersey, where he ran the debate team. Wanting a change of setting and a public university, he chose the College of William & Mary, entering during the 2008 presidential election campaign. He had been weighing a career in medicine, but has credited the election modelling that Nate Silver was then publishing on his new FiveThirtyEight blog with turning him toward mathematics. He rowed for the college crew team as a freshman before giving up the sport.

In 2010 Hickey joined the staff of the student newspaper The Flat Hat as online editor, at a time when the paper was moving further onto the web; he worked on video, social media and a redesign of its website. One article he produced there anticipated his later work: using records obtained through a freedom of information request to the college's parking service, he compared how often individual lots generated citations. He has said the combination suited him, since a mathematics degree on its own left him without an outlet for other skills.

Hickey graduated in 2012 with a degree in applied mathematics, concentrating in probability and statistics.

== Career ==
Hickey interned at Business Insider and was a full-time reporter there from October 2012 to November 2013, then moved to FiveThirtyEight, where he wrote about entertainment and lifestyle and produced the daily column Significant Digits; his title has been given as lead lifestyle writer and, in later accounts, as chief culture writer. He returned to Insider in 2018 as senior editor for data and also edited the publication's comics journalism project, Insider Comics. In 2022 he led the data analysis for "Red, White and Gray", a project on the oldest Congress in American history.

On December 28, 2021, Insider published "How I escaped a Chinese internment camp", a comic based on interviews with Zumrat Duwat, a Uyghur woman who described being detained in a camp before leaving China for the United States. Hickey was credited as the story's editor, conducted the interviews with Del Col and checked that the artwork met journalistic standards. The Pulitzer board cited the work for "using graphic reportage and the comics medium to tell a powerful yet intimate story of the Chinese oppression of the Uyghurs, making the issue accessible to a wider public". It was Insider's first Pulitzer Prize, and the category was in its first year, having replaced the prize for editorial cartooning with a broader remit.

By 2024, Hickey was deputy editor for data and analysis at Business Insider; in February that year, he was hired as executive editor of Sherwood, the media arm of the retail trading platform Robinhood Markets.

Hickey writes Numlock News, a daily morning newsletter.

== Awards ==
- 2022 – Pulitzer Prize for Illustrated Reporting and Commentary, shared with Fahmida Azim, Anthony Del Col and Josh Adams
