= 1926 Pulitzer Prize =

Awards for journalism and related fields

The following are the Pulitzer Prizes for 1926.

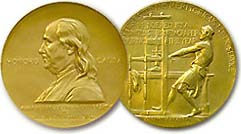
The gold medal awarded for Public Service in Journalism

== Journalism awards ==
- Public Service:
  - Columbus Enquirer Sun, for the service which it rendered in its brave and energetic fight against the Ku Klux Klan; against the enactment of a law barring the teaching of evolution; against dishonest and incompetent public officials and for justice to the Negro and against lynching.
- Reporting:
  - William Burke Miller of Louisville Courier-Journal, for his work in connection with the story of the trapping in Sand Cave, Kentucky, of Floyd Collins.
- Editorial Writing:
  - Edward M. Kingsbury of The New York Times, for "The House of a Hundred Sorrows".

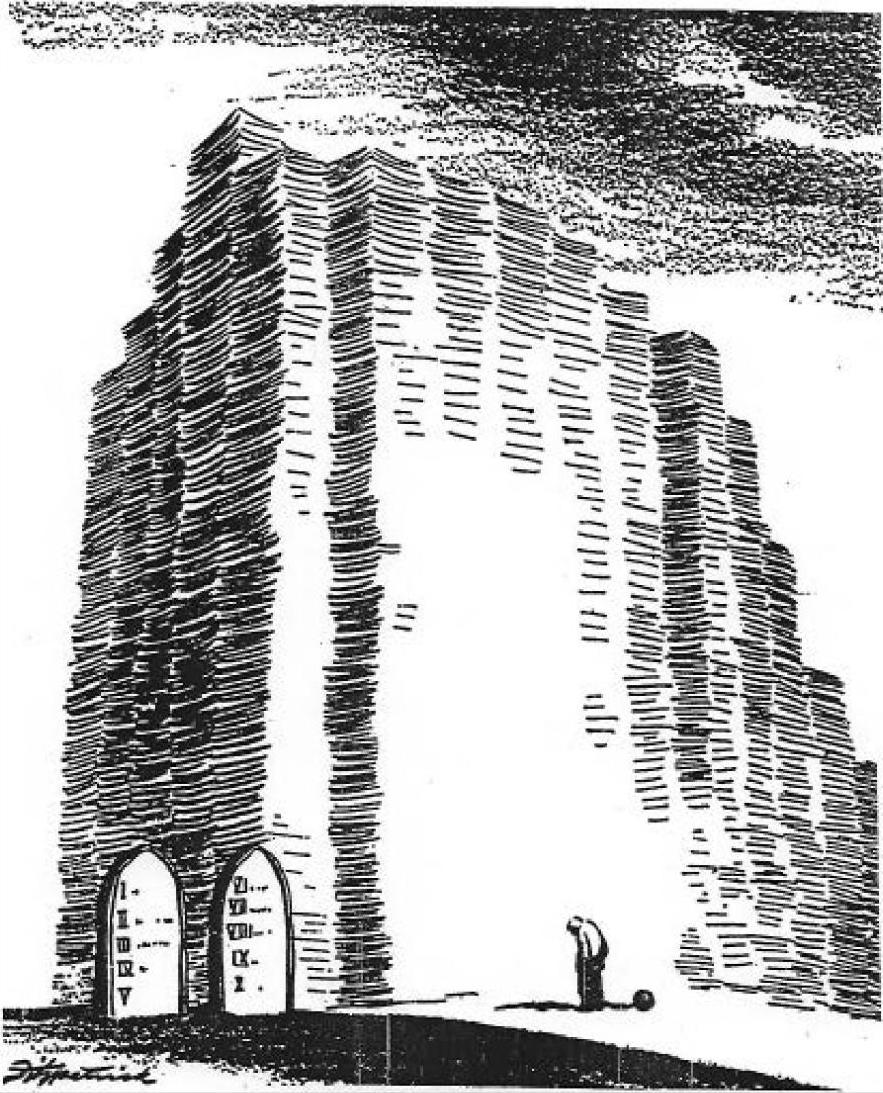
"The Laws of Moses and the Laws of Today", winner of the prize for Editorial Cartooning

- Editorial Cartooning:
  - D. R. Fitzpatrick of St. Louis Post-Dispatch, "The Laws of Moses and the Laws of Today".

== Letters and Drama Awards ==
- Novel:
  - Arrowsmith by Sinclair Lewis (Harcourt (publisher)) (declined)
- Drama:
  - Craig's Wife by George Kelly (Little, Brown and Company)
- History:
  - A History of the United States, Vol. VI: The War for Southern Independence (1849–1865) by Edward Channing (Macmillan Publishers)
- Biography or Autobiography:
  - The Life of Sir William Osler by Harvey Cushing (Oxford University Press)
- Poetry:
  - What's O'Clock by Amy Lowell (Houghton Mifflin Harcourt)
