= Paul Szep =

Canadian political cartoonist

- Born: Paul Michael Szep; July 29, 1941 (age 85) Hamilton, Ontario, Canada
- Area: Cartoonist

Paul Michael Szep (born July 29, 1941) is a Canadian political cartoonist. He was the chief editorial cartoonist at the Boston Globe from 1967 to 2001 and has been syndicated to hundreds of newspapers worldwide. He won the Pulitzer Prize twice for Editorial Cartooning in 1974 and 1977. Szep also won the prestigious international Thomas Nast Prize (1983). The Society of Professional Journalists/Sigma Delta Chi (SDX) honored him twice with its Distinguished Service Award for Editorial Cartooning (1973 and 1976). He won the National Headliner Award in 1977 and the National Cartoonists Society's Editorial Cartoonist of the year (1978). He has written more than a dozen books.

Born in Hamilton, Ontario, Canada, Szep is a graduate of the Ontario College of Art. He first started cartooning at the Financial Post newspaper in Canada. Although born in Canada, he is a naturalized U.S. citizen.

Szep was a strong opponent of the Vietnam War and his cartoons on Edward King, the governor of Massachusetts, resulted in his being sued for libel. In 1987, a court dismissed King's suit. His work is currently syndicated by Creators Syndicate. He has a daughter Amy (artist, born 1967). His son, Jason Szep (born 1969), a Reuters journalist, also won a Sigma Delta Chi Award (2007) and a Pulitzer Prize for International Reporting (2014). Jason Szep, formerly Southeast Asia Bureau Chief at Reuters, is now U.S. National Affairs Editor for Reuters, based in Washington.

He was profiled in a 1975 Dewar's White Label print advertisement. In 2010, a putter discarded by Szep and sold at a discount golf store was bought for $39 by Jim Furyk, who won the $11 million FedEx Cup tournament with it.
