= Charles Werner =

American cartoonist (1909–1997)

Charles George Werner (March 23, 1909 – July 1, 1997) was an American editorial cartoonist who won a Pulitzer Prize in 1939 and later worked 47 years for the Indianapolis Star.

== Biography ==
Charles Werner was born on March 23, 1909, in Marshfield, Wisconsin. Werner attended Oklahoma City University with no formal training in art. From 1930 until 1935 he worked as staff artist and photographer for Springfield, Missouri's Leader and Press. Werner joined the Daily Oklahoman in 1935, eventually becoming editorial cartoonist in 1937.

Werner left the Oklahoman for a job as Chief Editorial Cartoonist at the Chicago Sun in 1941. However he left the Sun for the Indianapolis Star in 1947 and worked there until his retirement in 1994. In 1959 he also served as the president of the Association of American Editorial Cartoonists.

In his nearly 60-year career, Werner's work garnered interest from several U.S. Presidents. In 1965 Lyndon B. Johnson requested over a dozen original cartoons for his personal collection. Former President Harry Truman also requested an original cartoon from Werner for his presidential library. Charles Werner died on July 1, 1997, from cancer.

== Awards ==
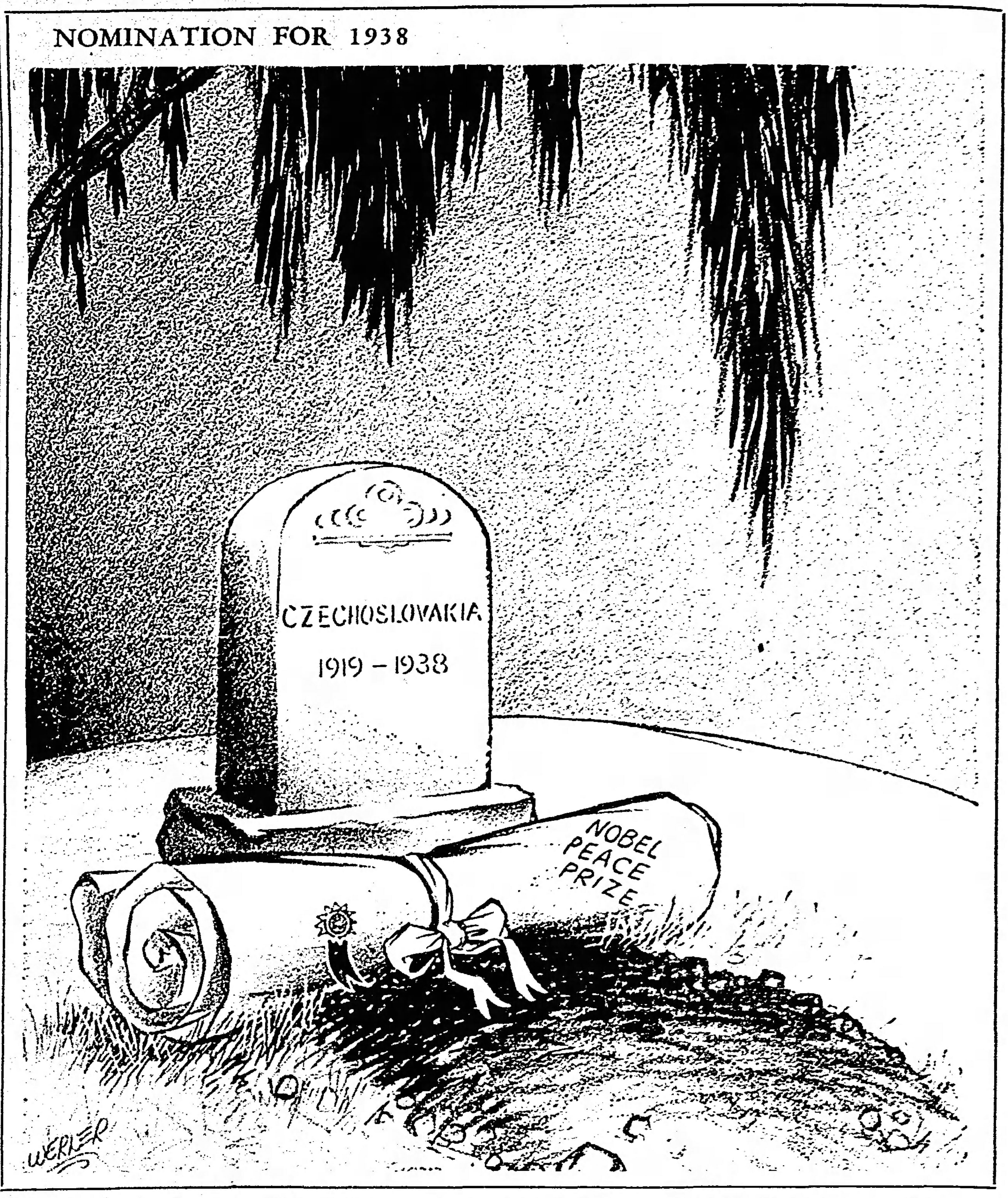
"Nomination for 1938", Werner's Pulitzer Prize-winning cartoon

Werner won the Pulitzer Prize for Editorial Cartooning in 1939. The winning cartoon was published in the Daily Oklahoman on October 6, 1938. Titled "Nomination for 1938", it depicted the Munich Agreement which provided for the transfer of Sudetenland to Hitler's Germany. At 29 years old, Werner was the youngest person to win the Pulitzer for Editorial Cartooning.

Werner also received the Sigma Delta Chi Award for excellence in journalism in 1943, and seven Freedom Foundation Awards (1951–1963). During the 1969 International Salon of Cartoons in Montreal, Werner won an award as one of the world's six best cartoonists.
