= H. M. Talburt =

American cartoonist (1895–1966)

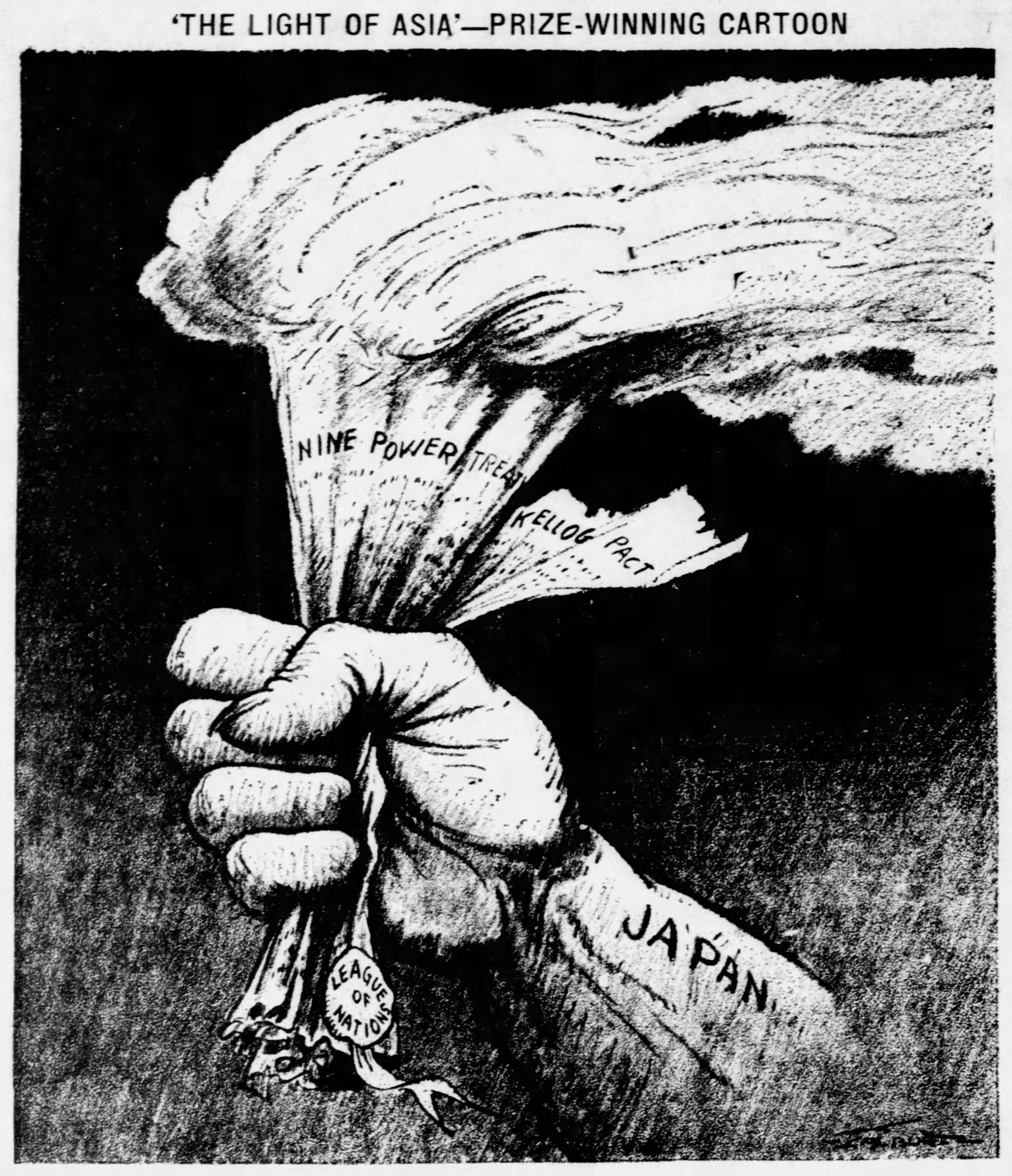
- "The Light of Asia," Talburt's 1933 Pulitzer Prize-winning editorial cartoon
- Born: Harold Morton Talburt; February 19, 1896; Toledo, Ohio
- Died: October 24, 1966 (aged 70); Kenwood, Maryland
- Occupation: Cartoonist
- Awards: Pulitzer Prize for Editorial Cartooning, 1933

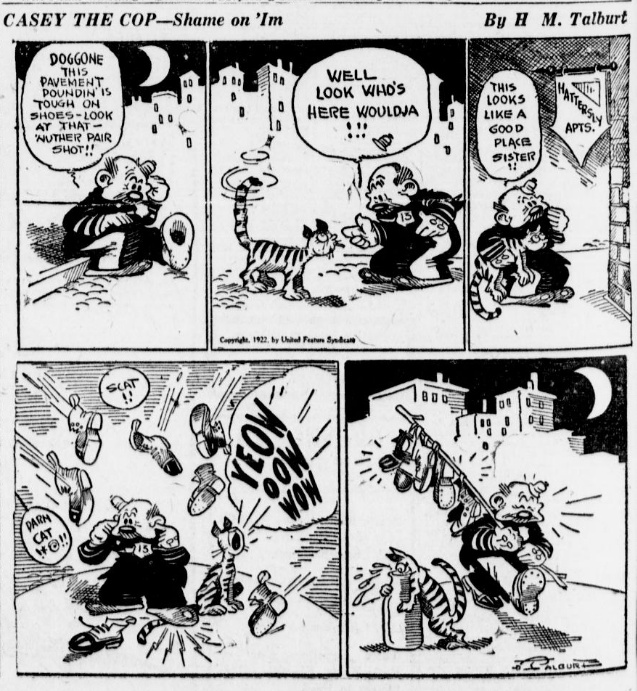
Casey the Cop comic strip, 1922

Harold Morton Talburt (February 19, 1895 – October 24, 1966) was an American cartoonist and illustrator who received the 1933 Pulitzer Prize for Editorial Cartooning.

Talburt was born in Toledo, Ohio. He started his career as a reporter with the Toledo News-Bee in 1916, and became an editorial cartoonist with the Scripps–Howard News Services in 1922. His 1932 cartoon "The Light of Asia", printed in The Washington Daily News, received the 1933 Pulitzer Prize, and his other awards included a 1956 Christopher Award and an award from the Freedoms Foundation. He was chief editorial cartoonist of Scripps–Howard for many years until his retirement in 1963. He was a member of the Gridiron Club of Washington, D.C., and served as its president in 1943.

Talburt was married to Marguerite Haynes Coombs until her death in 1944. They had two children. In 1947, he married Frances Karn Long. He died of cancer at his Kenwood, Maryland, home on October 24, 1966, aged 71.
