= Vaughn Shoemaker =

American cartoonist (1902–1991)

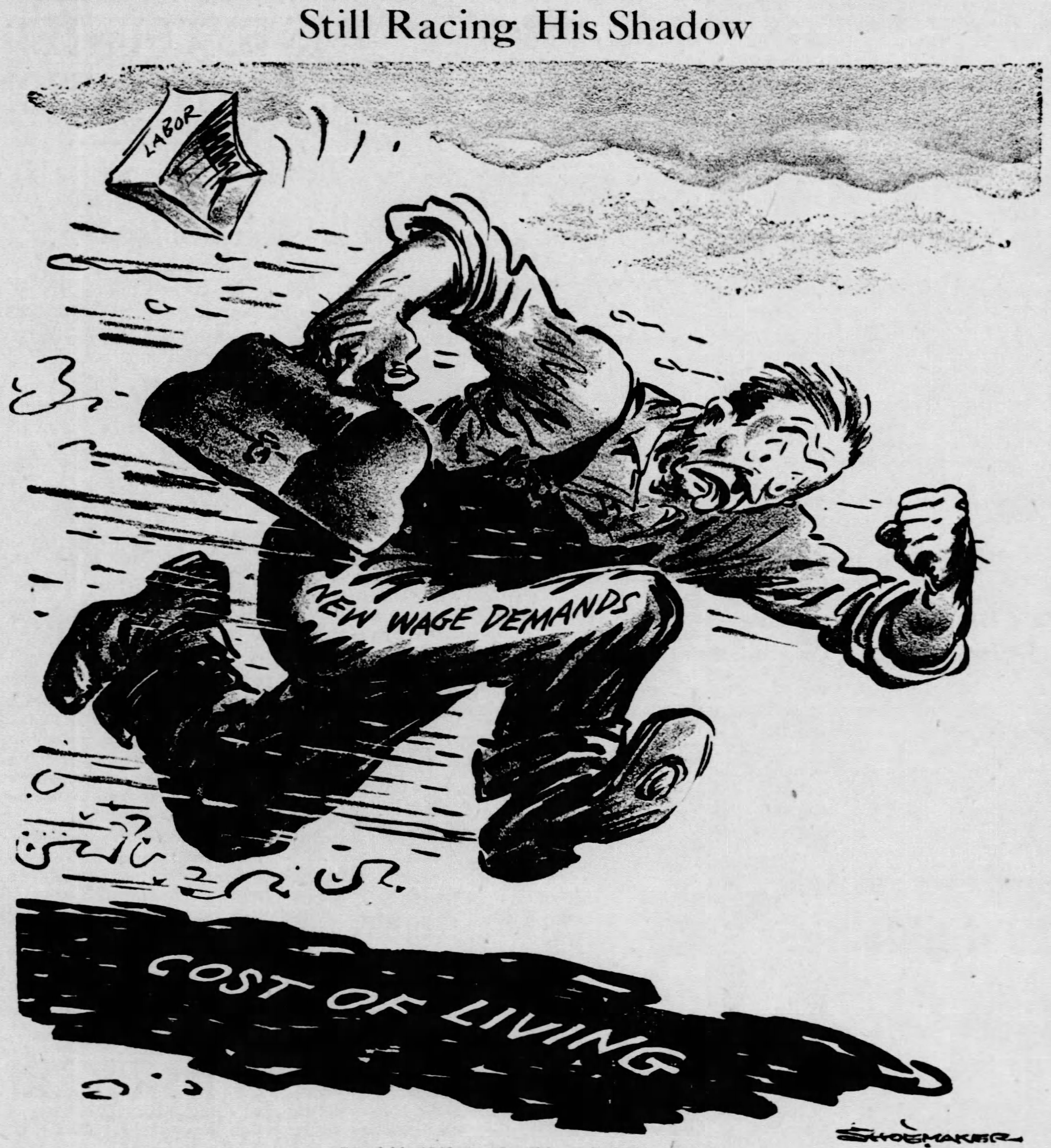
Still Racing His Shadow, 1947 Pulitzer Prize winning cartoon

Vaughn Richard Shoemaker (August 11, 1902 Chicago, Illinois – August 18, 1991 Carol Stream, Illinois) was an American editorial cartoonist. He won the 1938 and 1947 Pulitzer Prize for Editorial Cartooning and created the character John Q. Public.

Shoemaker started his career at the Chicago Daily News and spent 22 years there, and was the chief cartoonist between 1925 and 1952. His 1938 Pulitzer cartoon for the paper was The Road Back, featuring a World War I soldier marching back to war. The 1947 winning cartoon for the paper was Still Racing His Shadow, featuring "new wage demands" of workers trying to outrun his shadow "cost of living". He went on to work for the New York Herald Tribune between 1956 and 1961, and both the Chicago American, and Chicago Today from 1961 to 1971. By his January, 1972 retirement he had drawn over 14,000 cartoons.

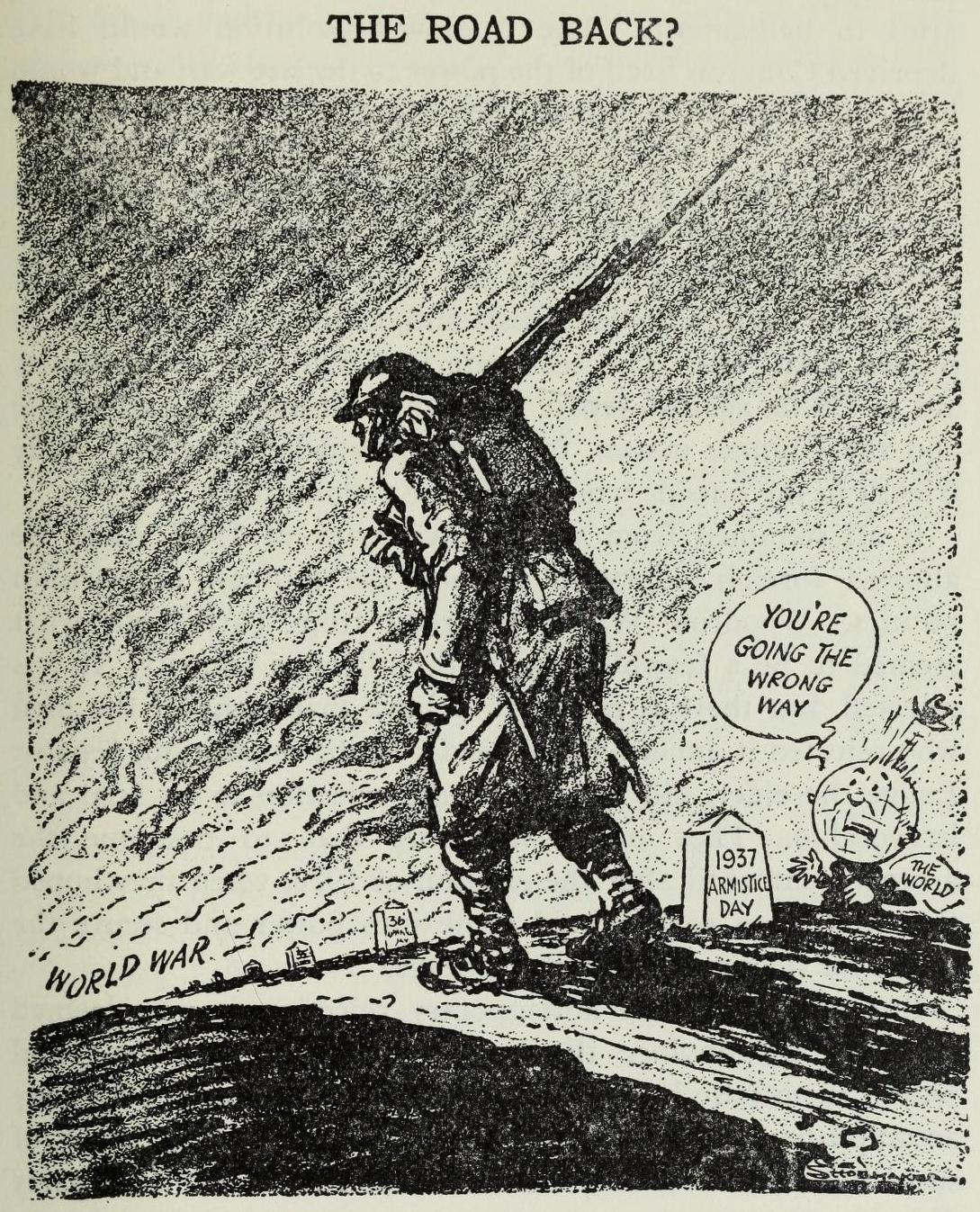
The Road Back, 1938 Pulitzer Prize winning cartoon

He lived in Carol Stream, Illinois and died of cancer at the age of 89.

== Gallery ==
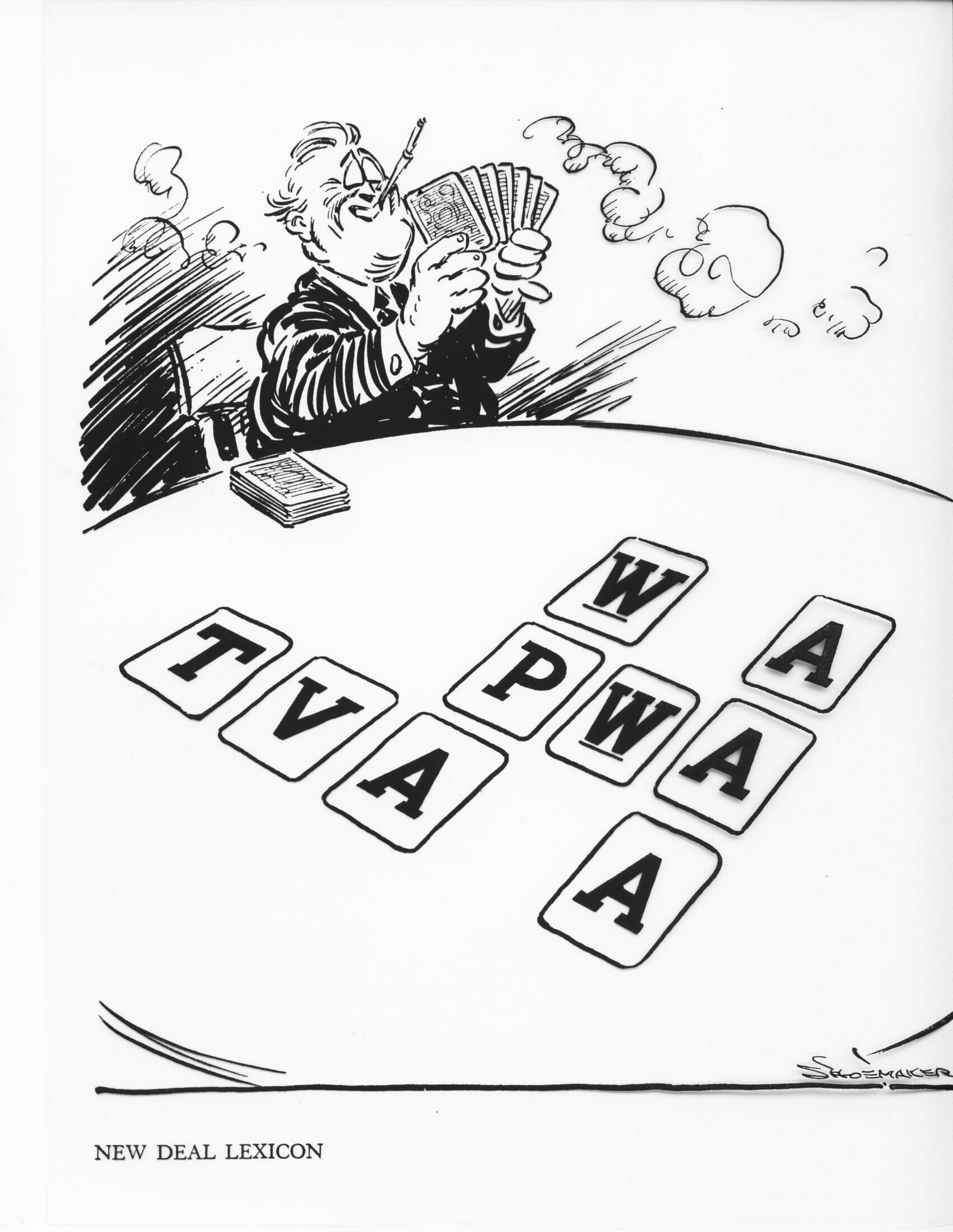
New Deal Lexicon, ink, 1935.

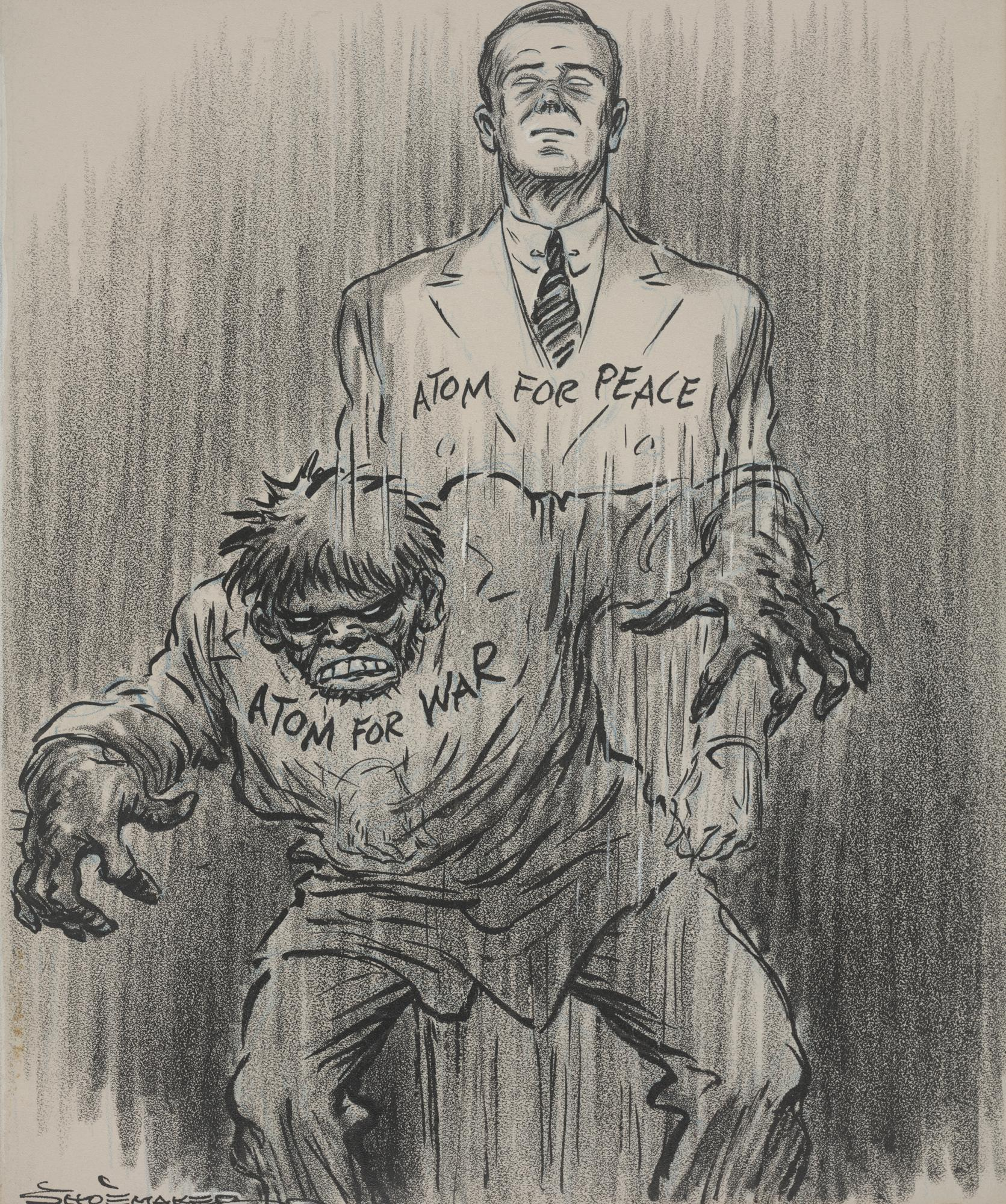
Dr. Jekyll or Mr. Hyde?, ink and crayon, Dallas Museum of Art.

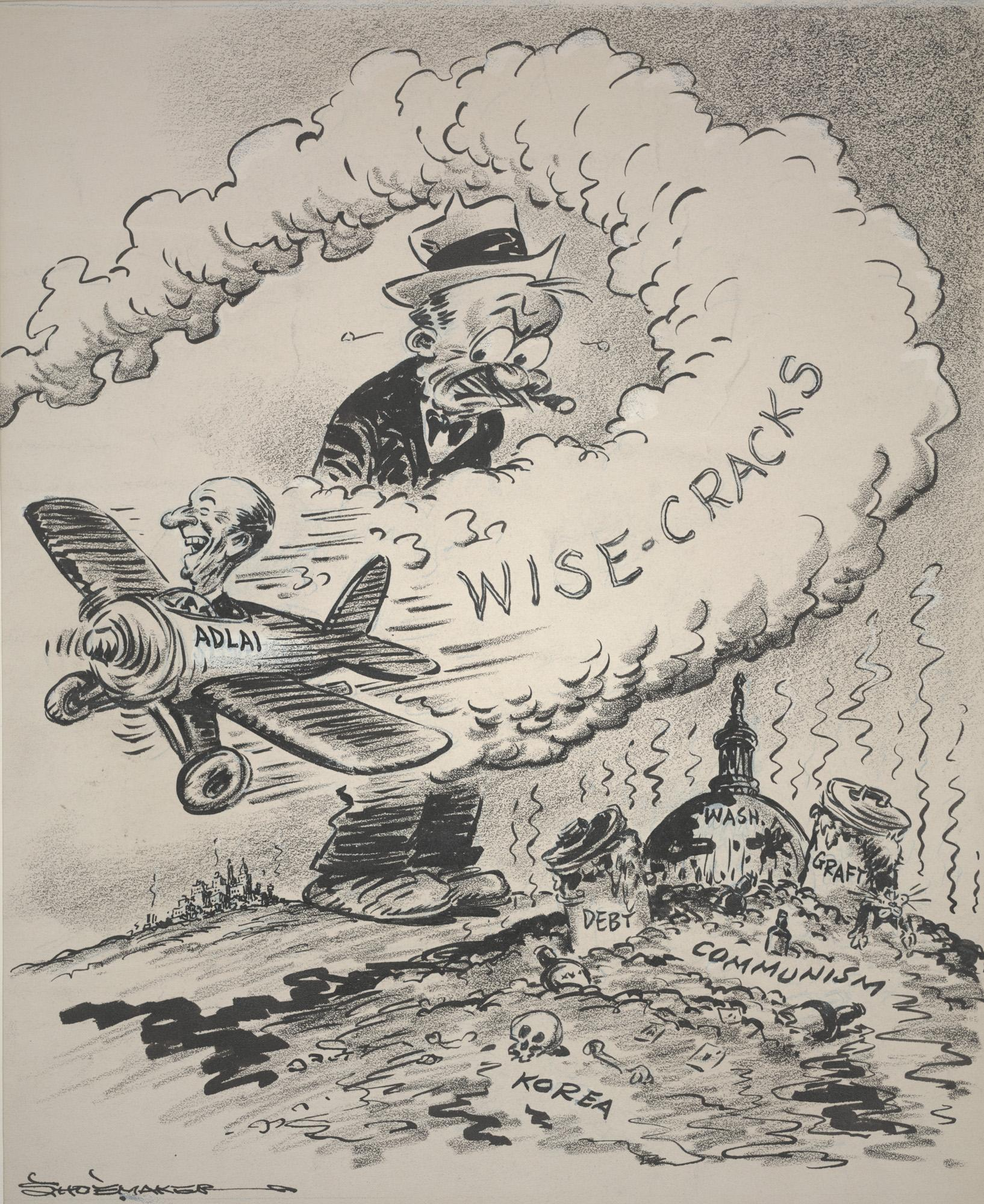
Smoke Screen, ink and crayon, Dallas Museum of Art.

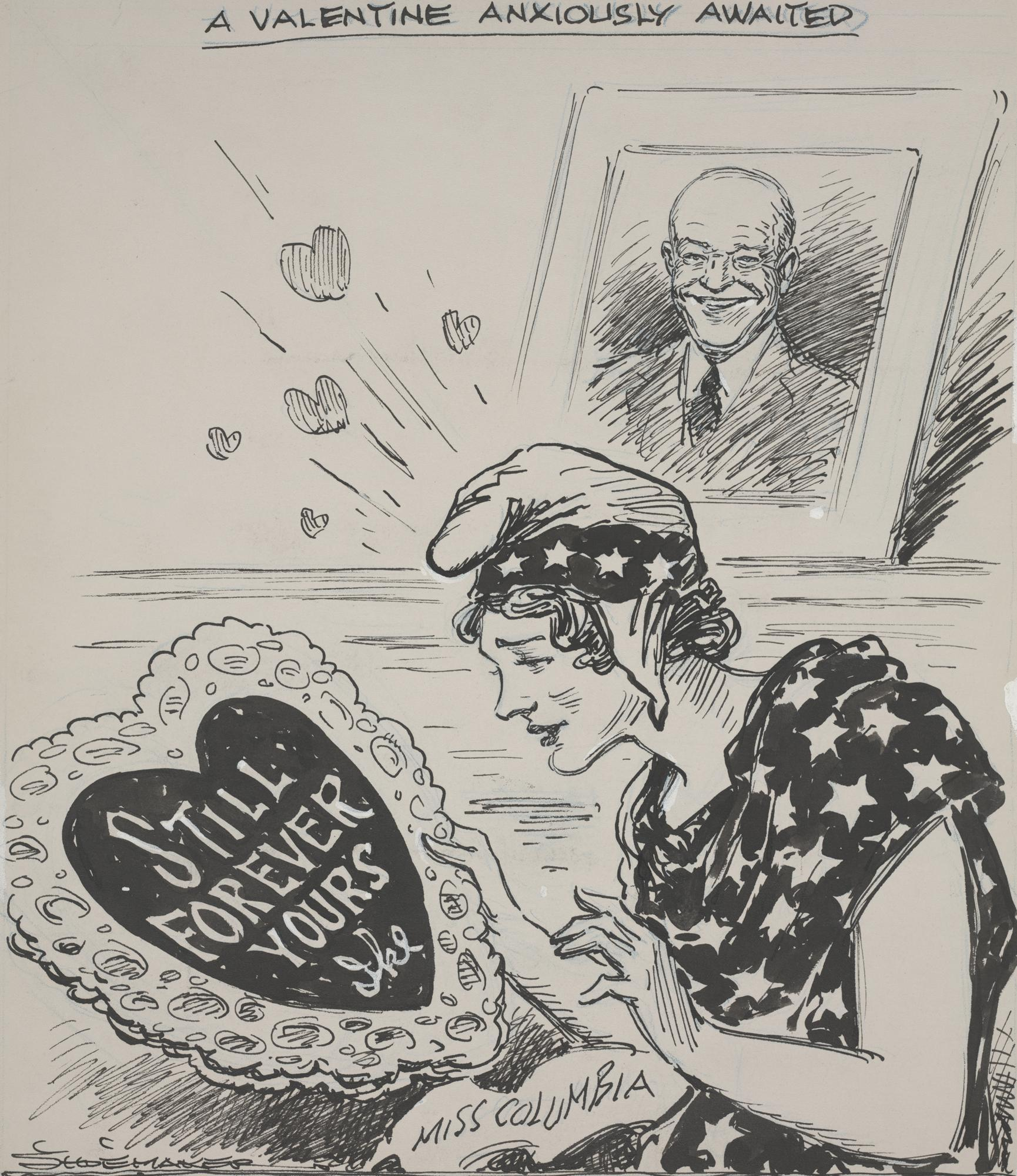
Valentine Awaited, ink and crayon, Dallas Museum of Art.

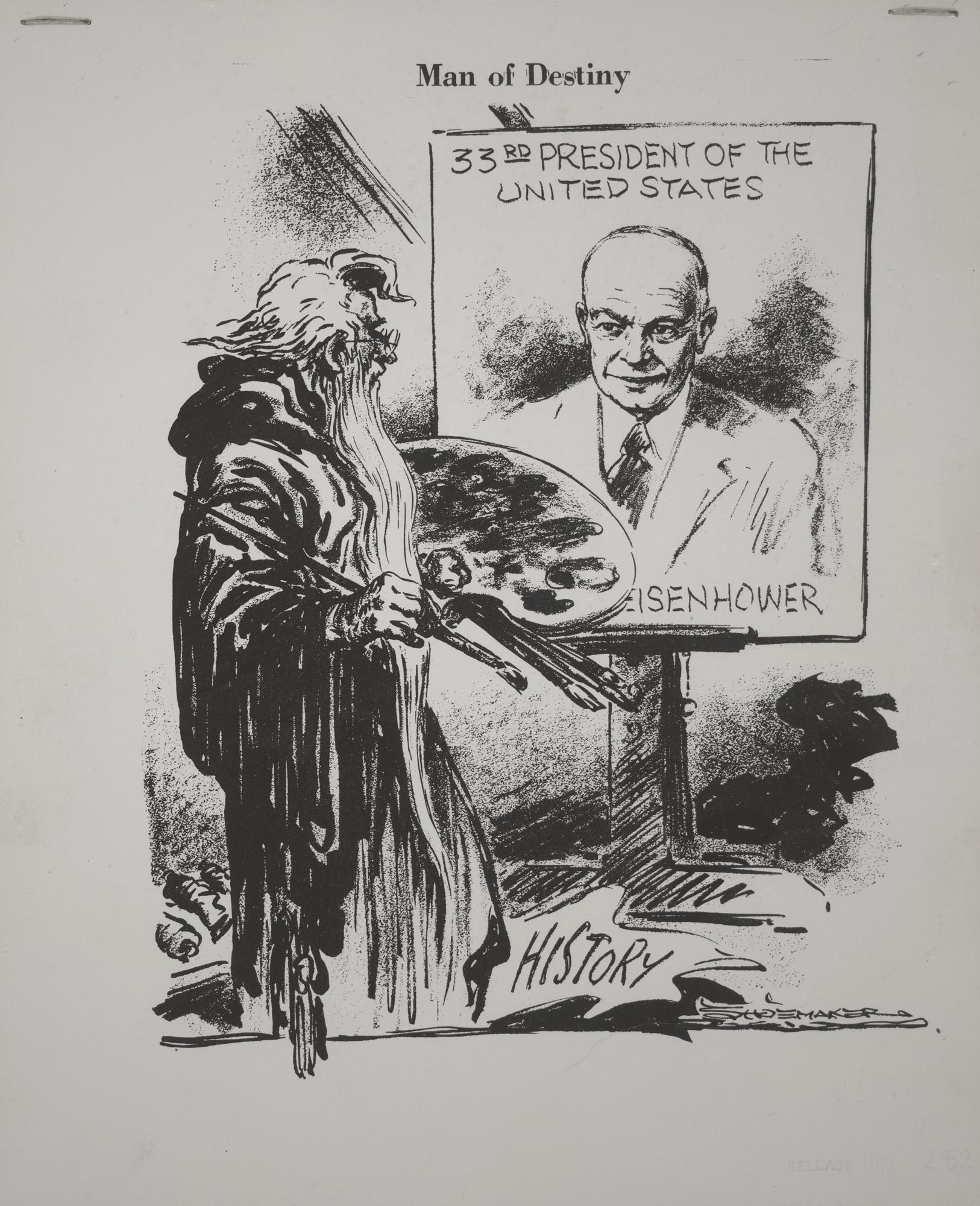
Man of Destiny (Eisenhower), ink and crayon, 1952, Dallas Museum of Art.

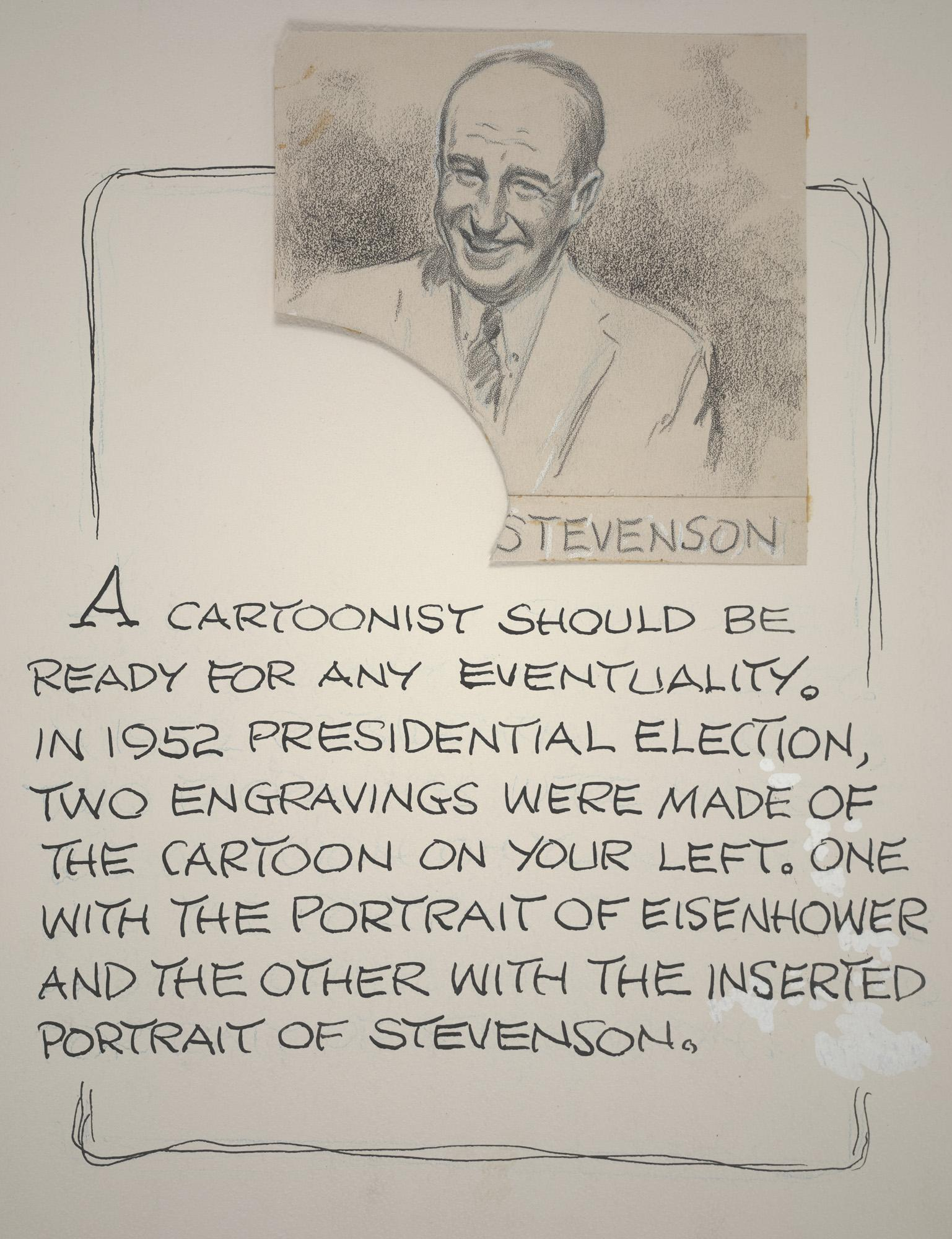
Man of Destiny (Stevenson), ink and crayon, 1952, Dallas Museum of Art.
