= Nelson Harding =

American editorial cartoonist (1879–1944)

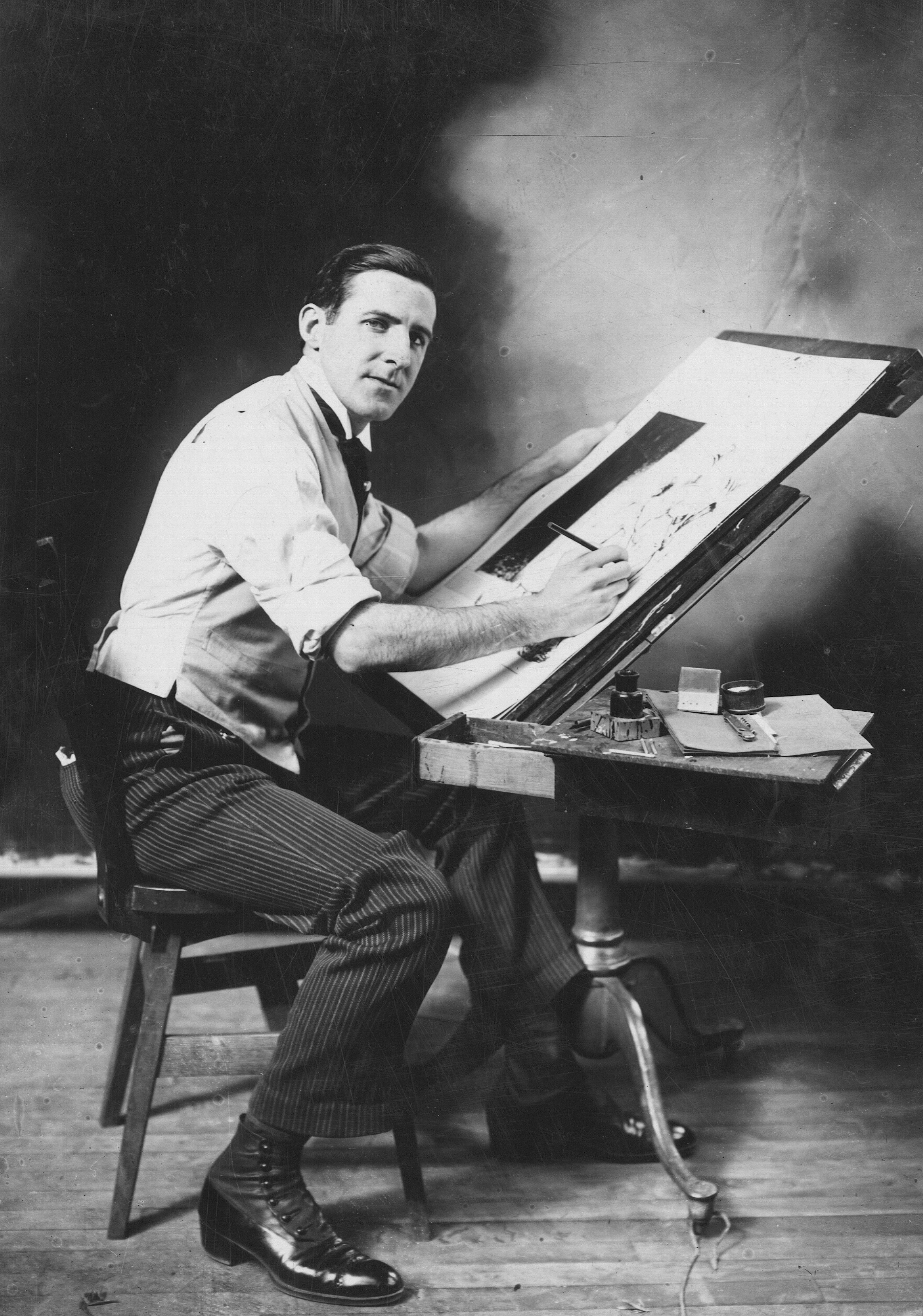
- Harding, 1917–1918
- Born: October 31, 1879; Brooklyn, New York, U.S.
- Died: December 30, 1944; The Bronx, New York, U.S.
- Occupation: Cartoonist
- Employer: The Brooklyn Daily Eagle
- Known for: Pulitzer Prize for Editorial Cartooning

Nelson Harding (October 31, 1879 – December 30, 1944) was an American editorial cartoonist for the Brooklyn Daily Eagle. He won the annual Pulitzer Prize for Editorial Cartooning in both 1927 and 1928, and as of 2023 was the only cartoonist honored in consecutive years.

== Early life and education ==
Harding was born in Brooklyn. He attended Greenwich Academy, the Chase School, the Art Students League of New York, and the New York School of Art. While at the Chase School, he was instructed by Robert Henri.

== Career ==
In 1898, Harding served in the Spanish–American War with the United States Volunteers and 71st New York Infantry Regiment. In 1901, he was promoted to sergeant under Major J.H. Wells. Harding started working for the Brooklyn Daily Eagle in 1908, where he became a successful cartoonist.

Harding received a Pulitzer Prize in 1927 for "Toppling The Idol", of which he depicted the "passive effect of the League of Nations" when dealing with the war. He used the images of David and Goliath. The particular cartoon cited in 1928, "May His Shadow Never Grow Less", was a tribute drawn at the end of the 1927 calendar year to flier Charles Lindbergh, it was for the flight across the Mexico America border to improve the relations between the two countries. The Christmas-themed cartoon was published at the very end of 1927 and was eligible for Pulitzer consideration in 1928.

His work was often politically conservative by the standards of his day. He took a leading role in opposition to what some New Yorkers considered to be a threat from Bolshevism in the late 1910s, during the so-called First Red Scare. His cartoons portrayed political radicals as bomb-throwers and terrorists.

== Pulitzer Prizes ==
=== "Toppling the Idol" ===
For his cartoon that was published on September 19, 1926, Harding won the Pulitzer Prize for Editorial Cartooning in 1927 with his cartoon "Toppling the Idol." It depicts a group representing the League of Nations dragging the statue of Mars (mythology) off its pedestal.

=== "May His Shadow Never Grow Less" ===
Published on December 15, 1927, the 1927 Pulitzer Prize for Editorial Cartooning winner depicts the Charles A. Lindbergh flight from New York to Paris in a single-engine plane. The religious symbol on the ground with the words "Peace on Earth and Goodwill to Men" was inspired by the approaching Christmas season.

== Gallery ==
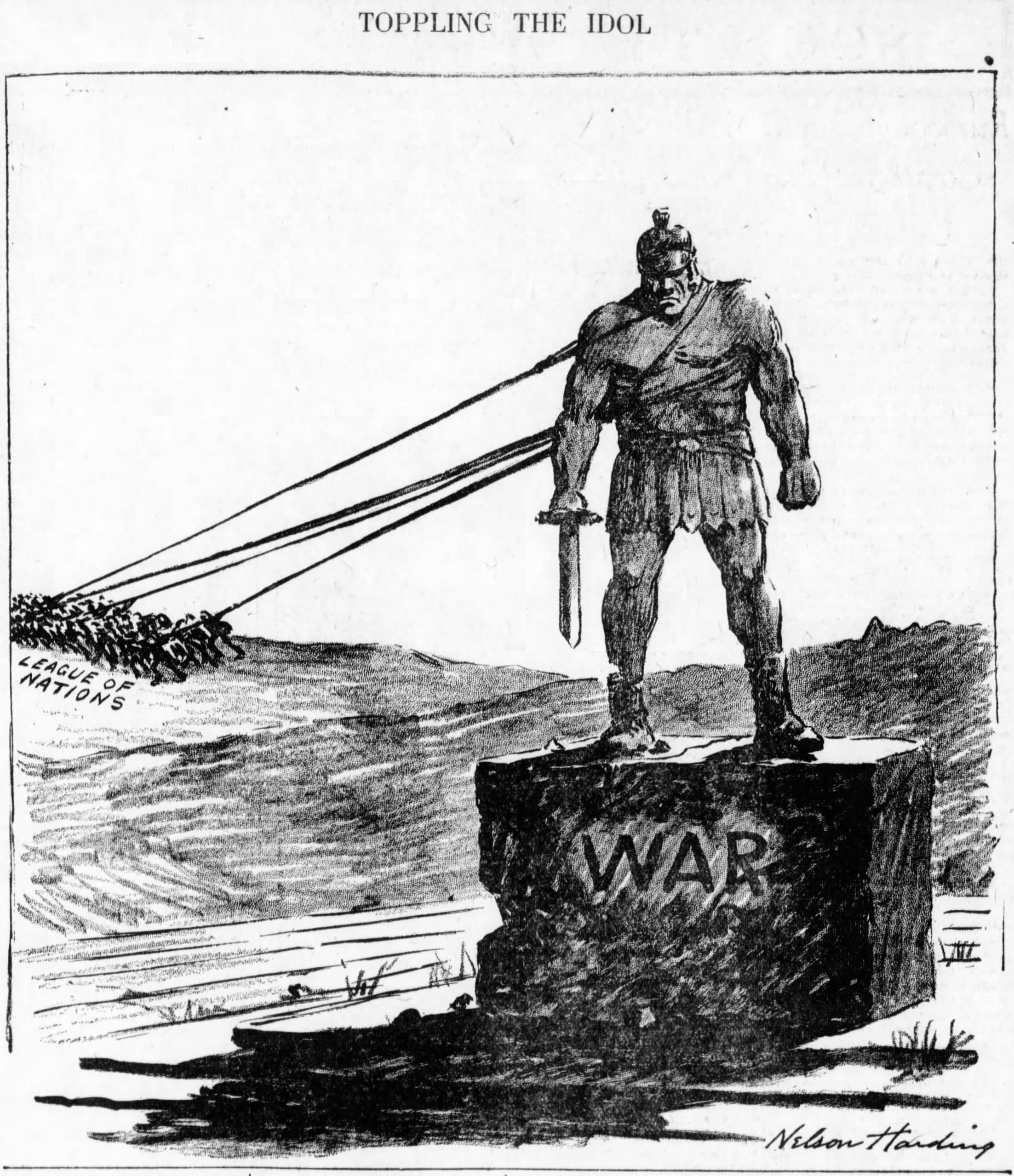
"Toppling the Idol", for which Harding received the 1927 Pulitzer Prize for Editorial Cartooning

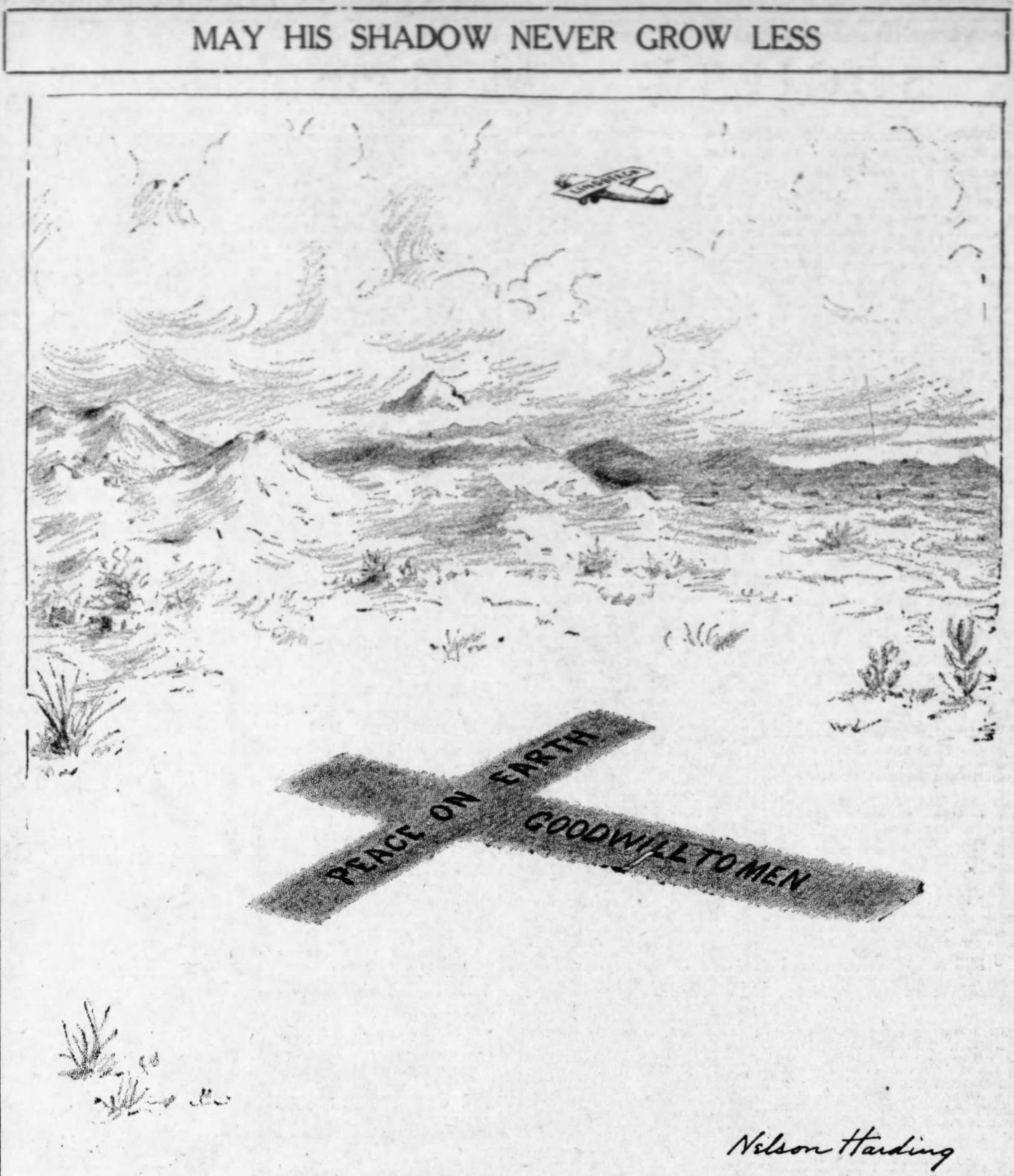
"May His Shadow Never Grow Less", for which Harding received the 1928 Pulitzer Prize for Editorial Cartooning

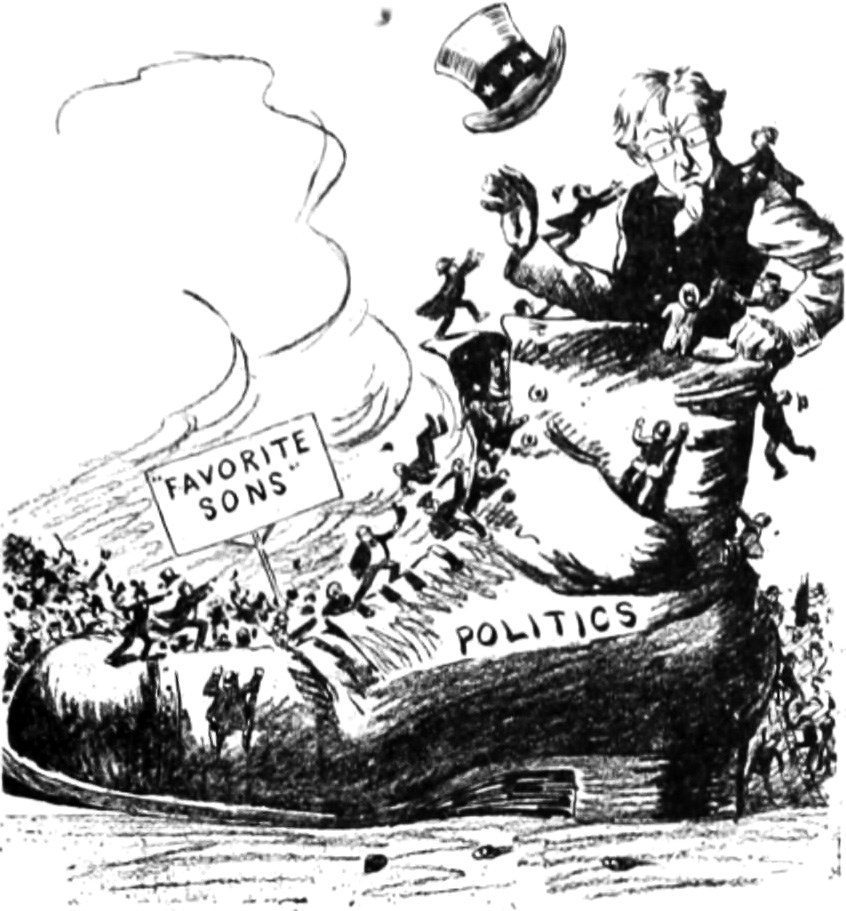
There Was An Old Man Who Lived in a Shoe

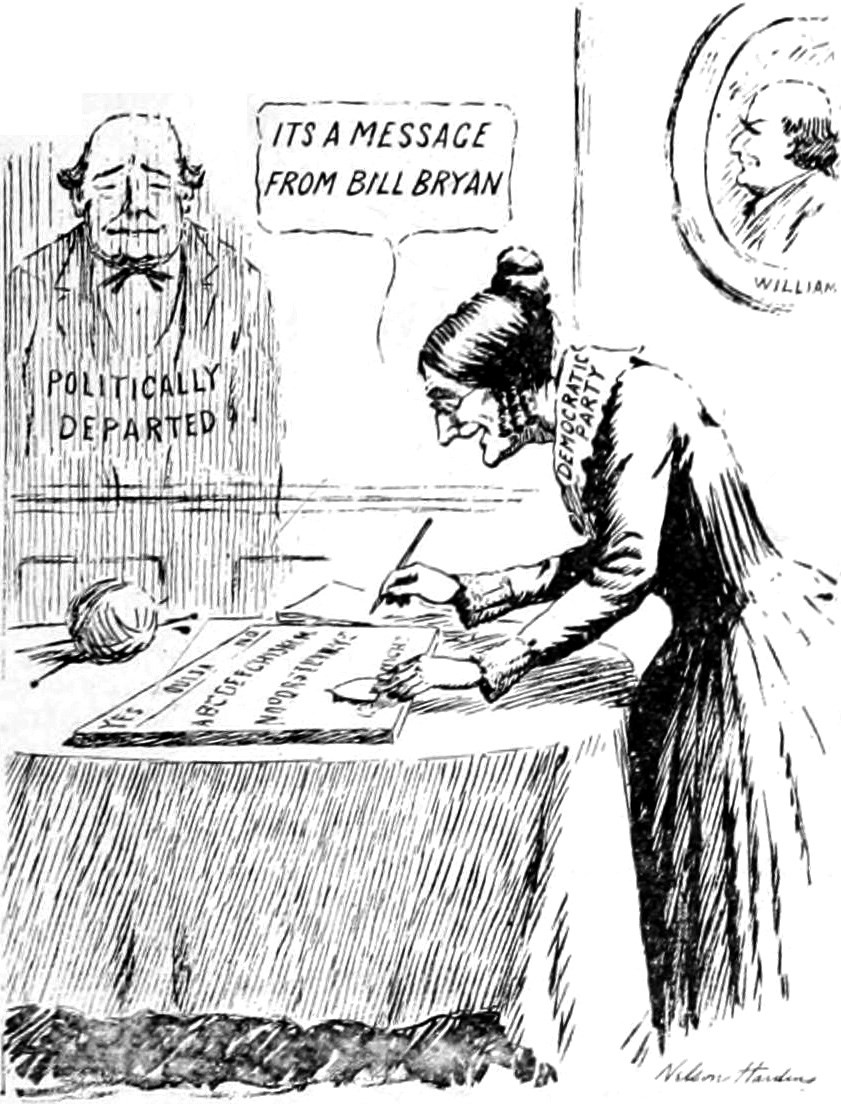
Fooling With The Ouija Board
