= Pulitzer Prize for International Reporting =

American journalism award

This Pulitzer Prize has been awarded since 1948 for a distinguished example of reporting on international affairs, including United Nations correspondence. Before this, the Pulitzer Prize for Correspondence was awarded from 1929 to 1947 and the Pulitzer Prize for Telegraphic Reporting – International was awarded from 1942 to 1947.

Category	Years	Emphasis	Nature of Work
Correspondence	1929–1947	Foreign reporting	Interpretive, narrative
Telegraphic Reporting – International	1942–1947	Breaking overseas news	Fast cable dispatches
International Reporting	1948–present	International affairs	Broad, modern global journalism

== List of winners for Pulitzer Prize for Telegraphic Reporting – International ==
Year	Name(s)	Publication	Rationale
1942	Laurence Edmund Allen	Associated Press	"for his reporting on the British Mediterranean Fleet, written as an accredited correspondent attached to the fleet."
1943	Ira Wolfert	North American Newspaper Alliance	"for a series of three articles on the fifth battle of the Solomon Islands."
1944	Daniel De Luce	Associated Press	"for his distinguished reporting during the year 1943."
1945	Mark S. Watson	The Baltimore Sun	"for distinguished reporting during the year 1944 from Washington, London and the fronts in Sicily, Italy and France."
1946	Homer Bigart	New York Herald Tribune	"for his distinguished reporting during the year 1945 from the Pacific war theatre."
1947	Eddy Gilmore	Associated Press	"for his correspondence from Moscow in 1946."

== List of winners for Pulitzer Prize for International Reporting ==
Year	Name(s)	Publication	Rationale
1948	Paul W. Ward	The Baltimore Sun	"for his series of articles published in 1947 on 'Life in the Soviet Union.'"
1949	Price Day	The Baltimore Sun	"for his series of 12 articles entitled, 'Experiment in Freedom: India and Its First Year of Independence.'"
1950	Edmund Stevens	The Christian Science Monitor	"for his series of 43 articles written over a three-year residence in Moscow entitled, 'This Is Russia Uncensored.'"
1951	Keyes Beech	Chicago Daily News	"for their reporting of the Korean War."
1951	Fred Sparks	Chicago Daily News	"for their reporting of the Korean War."
1951	Homer Bigart	New York Herald Tribune	"for their reporting of the Korean War."
1951	Marguerite Higgins	New York Herald Tribune	"for their reporting of the Korean War."
1951	Relman Morin	Associated Press	"for their reporting of the Korean War."
1951	Don Whitehead	Associated Press	"for their reporting of the Korean War."
1952	John Hightower	Associated Press	"for the sustained quality of his coverage of news of international affairs during the year."
1953	Austin Wehrwein	Milwaukee Journal Sentinel	"for a series of articles on Canada."
1954	Jim G. Lucas	Scripps-Howard Newspapers	"for his notable front-line human interest reporting of the Korean War, the cease-fire and the prisoner-of-war exchanges, climaxing 26 months of distinguished service as a war correspondent."
1955	Harrison Salisbury	The New York Times	"for his distinguished series of articles, 'Russia Re-Viewed,' based on his six years as a Times correspondent in Russia. The perceptive and well-written Salisbury articles made a valuable contribution to American understanding of what is going on inside Russia. This was principally due to the writer's wide range of subject matter and depth of background plus a number of illuminating photographs which he took."
1956	Frank Conniff	International News Service	"for a series of exclusive interviews with the leaders of the Soviet Union."
1956	William Randolph Hearst Jr.	International News Service	"for a series of exclusive interviews with the leaders of the Soviet Union."
1956	J. Kingsbury-Smith	International News Service	"for a series of exclusive interviews with the leaders of the Soviet Union."
1957	Russell Jones	United Press	"for his excellent and sustained coverage of the Hungarian revolt against Communist domination, during which he worked at great personal risk within Russian-held Budapest and gave front-line eyewitness reports of the ruthless Soviet repression of the Hungarian people."
1958	Staff	The New York Times	"for its distinguished coverage of foreign news, which was characterized by admirable initiative, continuity and high quality during the year."
1959	Joseph Martin	New York Daily News	"for their exclusive series of articles disclosing the brutality of the Batista government in Cuba long before its downfall and forecasting the triumph of the Cuban revolution party led by Fidel Castro."
1959	Philip Santora	New York Daily News	"for their exclusive series of articles disclosing the brutality of the Batista government in Cuba long before its downfall and forecasting the triumph of the Cuban revolution party led by Fidel Castro."
1960	A. M. Rosenthal	The New York Times	"for his perceptive and authoritative reporting from Poland. Mr. Rosenthal's subsequent expulsion from the country was attributed by Polish government spokesmen to the depth his reporting into Polish affairs, there being no accusation of false reporting."
1961	Lynn Heinzerling	Associated Press	"for his reporting under extraordinarily difficult conditions of the early stages of the Congo Crisis and his keen analysis of events in other parts of Africa."
1962	Walter Lippmann	New York Herald Tribune Syndicate	"for his 1961 interview with Soviet Premier Khrushchev, as illustrative of Lippmann's long and distinguished contribution to American journalism."
1963	Hal Hendrix	The Miami News	"for his persistent reporting which revealed, at an early stage, that the Soviet Union was installing missile launching pads in Cuba and sending in large numbers of MIG-21 aircraft."
1964	Malcolm Browne	Associated Press	"for their individual reporting of the Vietnam War and the overthrow of the Diem regime."
1964	David Halberstam	The New York Times	"for their individual reporting of the Vietnam War and the overthrow of the Diem regime."
1965	Joseph Livingston	Philadelphia Bulletin	"for his reports on the growth of economic independence among Russia's Eastern European satellites and his analysis of their desire for a resumption of trade with the West."
1966	Peter Arnett	Associated Press	"for his coverage of the war in Vietnam."
1967	John Hughes	The Christian Science Monitor	"for his thorough reporting of the attempted Communist coup in Indonesia in 1965 and the purge that followed in 1965-66."
1968	Alfred Friendly	The Washington Post	"for his coverage of the Middle East War of 1967."
1969	William Tuohy	Los Angeles Times	"for his Vietnam War correspondence in 1968."
1970	Seymour Hersh	Dispatch News Service	"for his exclusive disclosure of the Vietnam War tragedy at the hamlet of My Lai."
1971	Jimmie Lee Hoagland	The Washington Post	"for his coverage of the struggle against apartheid in the Republic of South Africa."
1972	Peter R. Kann	The Wall Street Journal	"for his coverage of the Indo-Pakistan War of 1971."
1973	Max Frankel	The New York Times	"for his coverage of President Nixon's visit to China in 1972."
1974	Hedrick Smith	The New York Times	"for his coverage of the Soviet Union and its allies in Eastern Europe in 1973."
1975	Ovie Carter (photographer)	Chicago Tribune	"for their coverage of famine in Africa and India."
1975	William Mullen (reporter)	Chicago Tribune	"for their coverage of famine in Africa and India."
1976	Sydney Schanberg	The New York Times	"for his coverage of the Communist takeover in Cambodia, carried out at great risk when he elected to stay at his post after the fall of Phnom Penh."
1977	No award		
1978	Henry Kamm	The New York Times	"for his stories on the refugees, 'Vietnamese boat people,' from Indochina."
1979	Richard Ben Cramer	The Philadelphia Inquirer	"for reports from the Middle East."
1980	Joel Brinkley (reporter)	Louisville Courier-Journal	"for stories from Cambodia."
1980	Jay Mather (photographer)	Louisville Courier-Journal	"for stories from Cambodia."
1980	Peter Arnett	Associated Press	"for reporting on the world's homeless."
1980	Fox Butterfield	The New York Times	"for dispatches from China."
1980	Staff	Los Angeles Times	"for coverage of Iran."
1981	Shirley Christian	Miami Herald	"for her dispatches from Central America."
1981	Richard Ben Cramer	The Philadelphia Inquirer	"for his coverage of the Afghanistan rebellion."
1981	Randall Richard	The Providence Journal-Bulletin	"for his coverage of illegal drug activity in Colombia."
1982	John Darnton	The New York Times	"for his reporting from Poland."
1982	Dan Fisher	Los Angeles Times	"for his reporting from Poland."
1982	Ray Moseley	Chicago Tribune	"for his series on the problems of black Africa."
1982	Bob Wyrick	Newsday	"for his series on the distribution abroad of American-made products in ways that would be held illegal or improper in the U.S. itself."
1983	Thomas L. Friedman	The New York Times	"for their individual reporting of the Israeli invasion of Beirut and its tragic aftermath."
1983	Loren Jenkins	The Washington Post	"for their individual reporting of the Israeli invasion of Beirut and its tragic aftermath."
1983	Rod Nordland	The Philadelphia Inquirer	"for his coverage of the impact of war and famine on Cambodia, Vietnam and East Timor."
1984	Karen Elliott House	The Wall Street Journal	"for her extraordinary series of interviews with Jordan's King Hussein which correctly anticipated the problems that would confront the Reagan administration's Middle East peace plan."
1984	David K. Shipler	The New York Times	"for his reporting from Israel which analyzed the mind of the nation."
1984	Morris Thompson	Newsday	"for his thorough, first-hand coverage of the island of Grenada before, during and after the U.S. invasion."
1985	Dennis Bell (reporter)	Newsday	"for their series on the plight of the hungry in Africa."
1985	Joshua Friedman (reporter)	Newsday	"for their series on the plight of the hungry in Africa."
1985	Ozier Muhammad (photographer)	Newsday	"for their series on the plight of the hungry in Africa."
1985	David Zucchino	The Philadelphia Inquirer	"for his thorough and elegantly written dispatches from Lebanon."
1985	Staff	The New York Times	"for its comprehensive coverage of Indira Gandhi's assassination and its impact on India's future."
1986	Pete Carey	San Jose Mercury News	"for their June 1985 series that documented massive transfers of wealth abroad by President Marcos and his associates and had a direct impact on subsequent political developments in the Philippines and the United States."
1986	Katherine Ellison	San Jose Mercury News	"for their June 1985 series that documented massive transfers of wealth abroad by President Marcos and his associates and had a direct impact on subsequent political developments in the Philippines and the United States."
1986	Lewis Simons	San Jose Mercury News	"for their June 1985 series that documented massive transfers of wealth abroad by President Marcos and his associates and had a direct impact on subsequent political developments in the Philippines and the United States."
1986	Jacqui Banaszynski	St. Paul Pioneer Press	"for her personalized account of African famine victims in Sudan, 'The Trail of Tears.'"
1986	Robert Rosenthal	The Philadelphia Inquirer	"for his sustained and comprehensive reportage from South Africa."
1987	Michael Parks	Los Angeles Times	"for his balanced and comprehensive coverage of South Africa."
1987	Phil Bronstein	San Francisco Examiner	"for his vivid and detailed coverage of the fall of the Marcos regime in the Philippines."
1987	Mark Patinkin	The Providence Journal-Bulletin	"for his skillful coverage of religious strife in Northern Ireland, India and Lebanon."
1988	Thomas L. Friedman	The New York Times	"for balanced and informed coverage of Israel."
1988	Larry Olmstead	Detroit Free Press	"for comprehensive reports from South Africa about the African National Congress."
1988	Randall Richard	The Providence Journal-Bulletin	"for his series 'The Baby Trade,' describing Americans eager to adopt Latin American children and the parents who choose to give them up."
1989	Glenn Frankel	The New York Times	"for resourceful and detailed coverage of events in the U.S.S.R."
1989	Bill Keller	The Washington Post	"for sensitive and balanced reporting from Israel and the Middle East."
1989	David Zucchino	The Philadelphia Inquirer	"for his richly compelling series, 'Being Black in South Africa.'" (Note: Moved by the Pulitzer board from the Feature Writing category.)
1990	Nicholas Kristof	The New York Times	"for knowledgeable reporting from China on the 1989 Chinese democracy movement and its subsequent suppression."
1990	Sheryl WuDunn	The New York Times	"for knowledgeable reporting from China on the 1989 Chinese democracy movement and its subsequent suppression."
1990	David Remnick	The Washington Post	"for coverage of the dramatic changes in the Soviet Union and the communist bloc in the Gorbachev era."
1990	Serge Schmemann	The New York Times	"for penetrating reports on the momentous political changes in East Germany, West Germany and Eastern Europe."
1991	Caryle Murphy	The Washington Post	"for her dispatches from occupied Kuwait, some of which she filed while in hiding from Iraqi authorities."
1991	Serge Schmemann	The New York Times	"for his coverage of the reunification of Germany."
1991	Staff	The Wall Street Journal	"for articles on the volatile Persian Gulf region, culminating in coverage of Iraq's invasion of Kuwait and its aftermath."
1992	Patrick J. Sloyan	Newsday	"for his reporting on the Persian Gulf War, conducted after the war was over, which revealed new details of American battlefield tactics and friendly fire incidents."
1992	Dudley Althaus	Houston Chronicle	"for his articles on the causes of the cholera epidemic in Peru and Mexico."
1992	Staff	Los Angeles Times	"for its vivid and comprehensive coverage of the Soviet Union's collapse."
1993	John Burns	The New York Times	"for his courageous and thorough coverage of the destruction of Sarajevo and the barbarous killings in the war in Bosnia-Herzegovina."
1993	Roy Gutman	Newsday	"for his courageous and persistent reporting that disclosed atrocities and other human rights violations in Croatia and Bosnia-Herzegovina."
1993	John-Thor Dahlburg	Los Angeles Times	"for his probing accounts of widespread nuclear pollution in the former Soviet Union."
1993	Jane Perlez	The New York Times	"for her revealing reporting on the famine and suffering in Somalia."
1994	Staff	The Dallas Morning News	"for its series examining the epidemic of violence against women in many nations."
1994	Keith Richburg	The Washington Post	"for his dispatches from Somalia."
1994	Carol Williams	Los Angeles Times	"for her reporting from the former Yugoslavia."
1995	Mark Fritz	Associated Press	"for his reporting on the ethnic violence and slaughter in Rwanda."
1995	Barbara Demick	The Philadelphia Inquirer	"for her reporting from Sarajevo, in which she describes the effects of war on a neighborhood."
1995	Lewis Simons	San Jose Mercury News	"for their series of stories on the growing economic and political influence of overseas Chinese on Asia."
1995	Michael Zielenziger	San Jose Mercury News	"for their series of stories on the growing economic and political influence of overseas Chinese on Asia."
1996	David Rohde	The Christian Science Monitor	"for his persistent on-site reporting of the massacre of thousands of Bosnian Muslims in Srebrenica."
1996	Laurie Garrett	Newsday	"for her courageous reporting from Zaire on the Ebola virus outbreak there."
1996	Staff	The Wall Street Journal	"for its coverage of the collapse of the Mexican peso and the resulting effect on world finance."
1997	John Burns	The New York Times	"for his courageous and insightful coverage of the harrowing regime imposed on Afghanistan by the Taliban."
1997	Tony Freemantle	Houston Chronicle	"for his reporting from Rwanda, South Africa, El Salvador and Guatemala on why crimes against humanity go unstopped and unpunished."
1997	Staff	Chicago Tribune	"for its global examination of overpopulation illustrated by struggling families who continue to bear children they cannot afford."
1998	Staff	The New York Times	"for its revealing series that profiled the corrosive effects of drug corruption in Mexico."
1998	Nicholas Kristof	The New York Times	"for his compelling comprehensive and compassionate reporting from Africa and Asia."
1998	John Pomfret	The Washington Post	"for his series, written under difficult conditions, on Laurent Kabila's brutal rise to power in Zaire."
1999	Staff	The Wall Street Journal	"for its in-depth, analytical coverage of the 1998 Russian financial crisis."
1999	David Hoffman	The Washington Post	"for his gripping stories on the dangerous legacy of chemical and nuclear weapons in post-communist Russia."
1999	Staff	The New York Times	"for its comprehensive coverage of the bombings of American embassies in Africa, which revealed crucial lapses in intelligence and security."
2000	Mark Schoofs	The Village Voice	"for his provocative and enlightening series on the AIDS crisis in Africa."
2000	Staff	Associated Press	"for its skillful and courageous coverage of the Russian attack on Chechnya."
2000	Staff	The Washington Post	"for its compelling, in-depth coverage of the war in Kosovo."
2001	Ian Johnson	The Wall Street Journal	"for his revealing stories about victims of the Chinese government's often brutal suppression of the Falun Gong movement and the implications of that campaign for the future."
2001	Paul Salopek	Chicago Tribune	"for his reporting on the political strife and disease epidemics ravaging Africa, witnessed firsthand as he traveled, sometimes by canoe, through rebel-controlled regions of the Congo."
2001	Maura Reynolds	Los Angeles Times	"for her reporting, at considerable personal risk, of the volatile aftermath of the war in Chechnya and the uncertain future engagement of Russia with that republic."
2002	Barry Bearak	The New York Times	"for his deeply affecting and illuminating coverage of daily life in war-torn Afghanistan."
2002	Dexter Filkins	The New York Times	"for his gracefully-written and revealing dispatches from the war in Afghanistan."
2002	Staff	The Washington Post	"for its comprehensive and insightful coverage of the war in Afghanistan and the international Al-Qaeda terror network."
2003	Mary Jordan	The Washington Post	"for their exposure of horrific conditions in Mexico's criminal justice system and how they affect the daily lives of people."
2003	Kevin Sullivan	The Washington Post	"for their exposure of horrific conditions in Mexico's criminal justice system and how they affect the daily lives of people."
2003	Alix M. Freedman	The Wall Street Journal	"for their remarkable reports revealing little-known ways that Saddam Hussein profited from the United Nations sanctions meant to punish him."
2003	Steve Stecklow	The Wall Street Journal	"for their remarkable reports revealing little-known ways that Saddam Hussein profited from the United Nations sanctions meant to punish him."
2003	R. C. Longworth	Chicago Tribune	"for 'A Fraying Alliance,' his perceptive series on emerging tensions between the United States and Europe."
2004	Anthony Shadid	The Washington Post	"for his extraordinary ability to capture, at personal peril, the voices and emotions of Iraqis as their country was invaded, their leader toppled and their way of life upended."
2004	Scott Kilman	The Wall Street Journal	"for their haunting stories that shed new light on starvation in Africa and prompted international agencies to rethink their policies."
2004	Roger Thurow	The Wall Street Journal	"for their haunting stories that shed new light on starvation in Africa and prompted international agencies to rethink their policies."
2004	David Zucchino	Los Angeles Times	"for his resourceful, sweeping and valorous reports that gave readers a rare, close-up view of combat as American soldiers invaded Iraq."
2005	Kim Murphy	Los Angeles Times	"for her eloquent, wide ranging coverage of Russia's struggle to cope with terrorism, improve the economy and make democracy work."
2005	Dele Olojede	Newsday	"for his fresh, haunting look at Rwanda a decade after rape and genocidal slaughter had ravaged the Tutsi tribe."
2005	Borzou Daragahi	The Star-Ledger	"for his vivid, deeply reported stories on the impact of the Iraq War on citizens and soldiers alike."
2006	Joseph Kahn	The New York Times	"for their ambitious stories on ragged justice in China as the booming nation's legal system evolves."
2006	Jim Yardley	The New York Times	"for their ambitious stories on ragged justice in China as the booming nation's legal system evolves."
2006	Steve Fainaru	The Washington Post	"for his powerful accounts of the deadly violence faced by ordinary American soldiers in Iraq as an insurgency intensified."
2006	Sebastian Rotella	Los Angeles Times	"for his well crafted reports on restive Muslims in Europe that foretold riots in France."
2007	Staff	The Wall Street Journal	"for reports on the adverse impact of Chinese capitalism."
2007	Anthony Shadid	The Washington Post	"for his vivid and insightful coverage of conflict in Lebanon that wove together frontline dispatches, personal history and analysis."
2007	Staff	Los Angeles Times	"for its courageous chronicling of Iraq's descent into what the newspaper labeled 'civil war.'"
2008	Steve Fainaru	The Washington Post	"for his heavily reported series on private security contractors in Iraq that operate outside most of the laws governing American forces."
2008	Staff	The New York Times	"for its valorous and comprehensive coverage of America's military efforts to reduce sectarian violence in Iraq."
2008	Staff	The Wall Street Journal	"for its in-depth reports on the dismantling of democracy in Russia under the leadership of Vladimir Putin."
2009	Staff	The New York Times	"for its masterful, groundbreaking coverage of America's deepening military and political challenges in Afghanistan and Pakistan, reporting frequently done under perilous conditions."
2009	Rukmini Callimachi	Associated Press	"for her in-depth investigation of the exploitation of impoverished children in West and Central Africa who are often traded like animals by adults who prize their labor."
2009	Staff	The Washington Post	"for its sensitive and moving examination of how females in the developing world are often oppressed from birth to death, a reporting project marked by indelible portraits of women and girls and enhanced by multimedia presentations."
2010	Anthony Shadid	The Washington Post	"for his rich, beautifully written series on Iraq as the United States departs and its people and leaders struggle to deal with the legacy of war and to shape the nation's future."
2010	Borzou Daragahi	Los Angeles Times	"for his coverage of the disputed election in Iran and its bloody aftermath, marked by firsthand knowledge and close-up portraits of individuals caught up in events."
2010	David Rohde	The New York Times	"for his riveting account of being held prisoner by the Taliban for seven months before his dramatic escape, using his eye for detail to depict memorably his militant captors."
2011	Ellen Barry	The New York Times	"for their dogged reporting that put a human face on the faltering justice system in Russia, remarkably influencing the discussion inside the country."
2011	Clifford J. Levy	The New York Times	"for their dogged reporting that put a human face on the faltering justice system in Russia, remarkably influencing the discussion inside the country."
2011	Deborah Sontag	The New York Times	"for her coverage of the earthquake in Haiti, steadfastly telling poignant, wide-ranging stories with a lyrical touch and an impressive eye for detail."
2011	Staff	The Wall Street Journal	"for its examination of the causes of Europe's debt crisis, taking readers behind closed doors to meet pivotal characters while illuminating the wider economic, political and social reverberations."
2012	Jeffrey Gettleman	The New York Times	"for his vivid reports, often at personal peril, on famine and conflict in East Africa, a neglected but increasingly strategic part of the world."
2012	Staff	The New York Times	"for its powerful exploration of serious mistakes concealed by authorities in Japan after a tsunami and earthquake devastated the nation, and caused a nuclear disaster."
2012	Staff	Reuters	"for its well-crafted reports on the momentous revolution in Libya that went beyond battlefield dispatches to tell the wider story of discontent, conflict and the role of outside powers."
2013	Jason Szep	The New York Times	"for his striking exposure of corruption at high levels of the Chinese government."
2013	Richard Marosi	Los Angeles Times	"for his provocative articles on the fate of thousands of illegal Mexican immigrants deported by the United States in recent years, many who are living desperate lives along the U.S.-Mexico border."
2013	Staff	Associated Press	"for its brave portrayal of the chaotic civil war in Syria, using text stories as well as multimedia tools to provide on-the-ground accounts as well as wider context, often at personal peril to the journalists."
2014	David Barboza	Reuters	"for their courageous reports on the violent persecution of the Rohingya, a Muslim minority in Myanmar that, in efforts to flee the country, often falls victim to predatory human-trafficking networks."
2014	Andrew Marshall	Reuters	"for their courageous reports on the violent persecution of the Rohingya, a Muslim minority in Myanmar that, in efforts to flee the country, often falls victim to predatory human-trafficking networks."
2014	Raja Abdulrahim	Los Angeles Times	"for their vivid coverage of the Syrian civil war, showing at grave personal risk how both sides of the conflict contribute to the bloodshed, fear and corruption that define daily life."
2014	Patrick McDonnell	Los Angeles Times	"for their vivid coverage of the Syrian civil war, showing at grave personal risk how both sides of the conflict contribute to the bloodshed, fear and corruption that define daily life."
2014	Rukmini Callimachi	Associated Press	"for her discovery and fearless exploration of internal documents that shattered myths and deepened understanding of the global terrorist network of Al-Qaeda."
2015	Staff	The New York Times	"for courageous front-line reporting and vivid human stories on Ebola in Africa, engaging the public with the scope and details of the outbreak while holding authorities accountable."
2015	Don Bartletti	Los Angeles Times	"for reporting on the squalid conditions and brutal practices inside the multibillion dollar industry that supplies vegetables from Mexican fields to American supermarkets."
2015	Richard Marosi	Los Angeles Times	"for reporting on the squalid conditions and brutal practices inside the multibillion dollar industry that supplies vegetables from Mexican fields to American supermarkets."
2015	Ned Parker	Reuters	"for intrepid reports of the disintegration of Iraq and the rise of ISIS, linking the developing catastrophe to a legacy of sectarianism, corruption and violence seeded by the U.S. invasion."
2015	Staff	Reuters	"for intrepid reports of the disintegration of Iraq and the rise of ISIS, linking the developing catastrophe to a legacy of sectarianism, corruption and violence seeded by the U.S. invasion."
2016	Alissa J. Rubin	The New York Times	"for thoroughly reported and movingly written accounts giving voice to Afghan women who were forced to endure unspeakable cruelties."
2016	Simon Clark	The Wall Street Journal	"for masterful reporting that exposed corruption at the highest levels of a fragile democracy, leading to 'Malaysia's Watergate.'"
2016	James Hookway	The Wall Street Journal	"for masterful reporting that exposed corruption at the highest levels of a fragile democracy, leading to 'Malaysia's Watergate.'"
2016	Bradley Hope	The Wall Street Journal	"for masterful reporting that exposed corruption at the highest levels of a fragile democracy, leading to 'Malaysia's Watergate.'"
2016	Mia Lamar	The Wall Street Journal	"for masterful reporting that exposed corruption at the highest levels of a fragile democracy, leading to 'Malaysia's Watergate.'"
2016	Tom Wright	The Wall Street Journal	"for masterful reporting that exposed corruption at the highest levels of a fragile democracy, leading to 'Malaysia's Watergate.'"
2016	Staff	The New York Times	"for shocking stories told in text, video and photography that demystified the rapid rise and enduring strength of the Islamic State."
2017	Staff	The New York Times	"for agenda-setting reporting on Vladimir Putin's efforts to project Russia's power abroad, revealing techniques that included assassination, online harassment and the planting of incriminating evidence on opponents."
2017	Chris Hamby	BuzzFeed News	"for an exposé of a dispute-settlement process used by multinational corporations to undermine domestic regulations and gut environmental laws at the expense of poorer nations."
2017	Staff	International Consortium of Investigative Journalists	"for the Panama Papers, a series of stories using a collaboration of more than 300 reporters on six continents to expose the hidden infrastructure and global scale of offshore tax havens." (Note: Moved by the Pulitzer board from the Explanatory Reporting category.)
2017	Staff	McClatchy	"for the Panama Papers, a series of stories using a collaboration of more than 300 reporters on six continents to expose the hidden infrastructure and global scale of offshore tax havens."
2017	Staff	Miami Herald	"for the Panama Papers, a series of stories using a collaboration of more than 300 reporters on six continents to expose the hidden infrastructure and global scale of offshore tax havens."
2017	Staff	The Wall Street Journal	"for clear and persistent coverage that shaped the world's understanding of dramatic events in Turkey as that nation careened from a promising democracy to a near-autocracy."
2018	Clare Baldwin	Reuters	"for relentless reporting that exposed the brutal killing campaign behind Philippines President Rodrigo Duterte's war on drugs."
2018	Andrew Marshall	Reuters	"for relentless reporting that exposed the brutal killing campaign behind Philippines President Rodrigo Duterte's war on drugs."
2018	Manuel Mogato	Reuters	"for relentless reporting that exposed the brutal killing campaign behind Philippines President Rodrigo Duterte's war on drugs."
2018	Staff	Associated Press	"for a devastating series that vividly showed that the human cost of the U.S.-led defeat of the Islamic State in the northern Iraqi city of Mosul was far greater than acknowledged."
2018	Staff	BuzzFeed News	"for a stunning probe across two continents that proved that operatives with apparent ties to Vladimir Putin have engaged in a targeted killing campaign against his perceived enemies on British and American soil."
2019	Maad al-Zikry	Associated Press	"for a revelatory yearlong series detailing the atrocities of the war in Yemen, including theft of food aid, deployment of child soldiers and torture of prisoners."
2019	Nariman El-Mofty	Associated Press	"for a revelatory yearlong series detailing the atrocities of the war in Yemen, including theft of food aid, deployment of child soldiers and torture of prisoners."
2019	Maggie Michael	Associated Press	"for a revelatory yearlong series detailing the atrocities of the war in Yemen, including theft of food aid, deployment of child soldiers and torture of prisoners."
2019	Wa Lone	Reuters	"for expertly exposing the military units and Buddhist villagers responsible for the systematic expulsion and murder of Rohingya Muslims from Myanmar, courageous coverage that landed its reporters in prison."
2019	Kyaw Soe Oo	Reuters	"for expertly exposing the military units and Buddhist villagers responsible for the systematic expulsion and murder of Rohingya Muslims from Myanmar, courageous coverage that landed its reporters in prison."
2019	Staff	Reuters	"for expertly exposing the military units and Buddhist villagers responsible for the systematic expulsion and murder of Rohingya Muslims from Myanmar, courageous coverage that landed its reporters in prison."
2019	~~Rukmini Callimachi~~	~~The New York Times~~	~~"for dissecting the power and persistence of the ISIS terror movement, through relentless on-the-ground and online reporting, and masterful use of podcast storytelling."~~ (Note: Rescinded in 2020 after one of the subjects profiled in Caliphate, Shehroze Chaudhry, was charged in Canada and an internal review by The New York Times then asked the Pulitzer board to withdraw recognition.)
2020	Staff	The New York Times	"for a set of enthralling stories, reported at great risk, exposing the predations of Vladimir Putin's regime."
2020	Staff	The New York Times	"for gripping accounts that disclosed China's top-secret efforts to repress millions of Muslims through a system of labor camps, brutality and surveillance."
2020	Staff	Reuters	"for a series of deeply-reported, original dispatches from the Hong Kong protests, a battleground between democracy and autocracy that detailed China's grip behind the scenes and offered valuable insights into the forces that will shape the next century."
2021	Christo Buschek	BuzzFeed News	"for a series of clear and compelling stories that used satellite imagery and architectural expertise, as well as interviews with two dozen former prisoners, to identify a vast new infrastructure built by the Chinese government for the mass detention of Muslims."
2021	Alison Killing	BuzzFeed News	"for a series of clear and compelling stories that used satellite imagery and architectural expertise, as well as interviews with two dozen former prisoners, to identify a vast new infrastructure built by the Chinese government for the mass detention of Muslims."
2021	Megha Rajagopalan	BuzzFeed News	"for a series of clear and compelling stories that used satellite imagery and architectural expertise, as well as interviews with two dozen former prisoners, to identify a vast new infrastructure built by the Chinese government for the mass detention of Muslims."
2021	Staff	BuzzFeed News	"for a massive reporting project that yielded sweeping revelations about the ongoing role of some of the world's biggest banks in facilitating international money laundering and the trafficking of goods and people, corruption that continues to frustrate regulators across the world."
2021	Staff	International Consortium of Investigative Journalists	"for a massive reporting project that yielded sweeping revelations about the ongoing role of some of the world's biggest banks in facilitating international money laundering and the trafficking of goods and people, corruption that continues to frustrate regulators across the world."
2021	Staff	The New York Times	"for a masterful synthesis of stellar writing, powerful images and engaging interactives that illustrated how the world was unprepared for a fast-moving global pandemic—and failed to contain it."
2021	Staff	The Wall Street Journal	"for an authoritative and deeply reported portrait of China's nationalist leader Xi Jinping and his increasingly authoritarian control of the state, its economy, and politics, conducted even after the news organization was expelled from the country."
2022	Azmat Khan	The New York Times	"for courageous and relentless reporting that exposed the vast civilian toll of U.S.-led airstrikes, challenging official accounts of American military engagements in Iraq, Syria and Afghanistan."
2022	Staff	The New York Times	"for courageous and relentless reporting that exposed the vast civilian toll of U.S.-led airstrikes, challenging official accounts of American military engagements in Iraq, Syria and Afghanistan."
2022	Yaroslav Trofimov	The Wall Street Journal	"for probing, deeply reported stories on the U.S. withdrawal from Afghanistan, including exclusive interviews conducted before the Taliban's return, casting new light on what happened in the country and what might come next."
2022	Staff	The Wall Street Journal	"for probing, deeply reported stories on the U.S. withdrawal from Afghanistan, including exclusive interviews conducted before the Taliban's return, casting new light on what happened in the country and what might come next."
2022	Staff	The New York Times	"for richly immersive coverage of the sudden, chaotic fall of the Afghan government and the return of the Taliban, highlighting the experience of Afghans as well as the reporters themselves."
2022	Staff	The New York Times	"for a stunning investigation of the assassination of Haiti's president that uncovered pervasive corruption across government, security forces and business elites, including a likely motive for the murder: a secret dossier the president was compiling of powerful arms and drug traffickers."
2023	Staff	The New York Times	"for their unflinching coverage of Russia's invasion of Ukraine, including an eight-month investigation into Ukrainian deaths in the town of Bucha and the Russian unit responsible for the killings."
2023	James Marson	The Wall Street Journal	"for prescient on-the-ground reporting from the shifting front lines of the war in Ukraine that presaged the Russian assault on Kyiv and chronicled the tenacious resistance of Ukrainian soldiers and civilians amidst so much devastation."
2023	Yaroslav Trofimov	The Wall Street Journal	"for prescient on-the-ground reporting from the shifting front lines of the war in Ukraine that presaged the Russian assault on Kyiv and chronicled the tenacious resistance of Ukrainian soldiers and civilians amidst so much devastation."
2023	Paul Carsten	Reuters	"for their reporting of Nigeria's campaign of lethal violence carried out by the military over a decade in which they forced thousands of women to undergo abortions after being freed from sexual captivity by Boko Haram rebels and also slaughtered dozens of their living children."
2023	Libby George	Reuters	"for their reporting of Nigeria's campaign of lethal violence carried out by the military over a decade in which they forced thousands of women to undergo abortions after being freed from sexual captivity by Boko Haram rebels and also slaughtered dozens of their living children."
2023	Reade Levinson	Reuters	"for their reporting of Nigeria's campaign of lethal violence carried out by the military over a decade in which they forced thousands of women to undergo abortions after being freed from sexual captivity by Boko Haram rebels and also slaughtered dozens of their living children."
2023	David Lewis	Reuters	"for their reporting of Nigeria's campaign of lethal violence carried out by the military over a decade in which they forced thousands of women to undergo abortions after being freed from sexual captivity by Boko Haram rebels and also slaughtered dozens of their living children."
2024	Staff	The New York Times	"for its wide-ranging and revelatory coverage of Hamas' lethal attack in southern Israel on Oct. 7, Israel's intelligence failures and the Israeli military's sweeping, deadly response in Gaza."
2024	Federico Rios	The New York Times	"for their immersive and ambitious coverage of 'migration purgatory' in the Darién Gap between Colombia and Panama."
2024	Julie Turkewitz	The New York Times	"for their immersive and ambitious coverage of 'migration purgatory' in the Darién Gap between Colombia and Panama."
2024	Staff	The Washington Post	"for a sweeping on-the-ground investigation in India that exposed the methodical undermining of the world's largest democracy by Narendra Modi and his Hindu nationalist allies, who have deployed social media to foment hate and pressure American tech giants to bend to government power."
2025	Declan Walsh	The New York Times	"for their revelatory investigation of the conflict in Sudan, including reporting on foreign influence and the lucrative gold trade fueling it, and chilling forensic accounts of the Sudanese forces responsible for atrocities and famine."
2025	Staff	The New York Times	"for their revelatory investigation of the conflict in Sudan, including reporting on foreign influence and the lucrative gold trade fueling it, and chilling forensic accounts of the Sudanese forces responsible for atrocities and famine."
2025	Staff	The Wall Street Journal	"for courageous, cool-headed reporting by imprisoned journalist Evan Gershkovich and his colleagues that revealed a previously unknown Russian intelligence agency, and for gripping work on the workings of Russia's secret services."
2025	Staff	The Washington Post	"for haunting accountability journalism that documented Israeli atrocities in the Gaza Strip and investigated the killings of Palestinian journalists, paramedics and a 6-year-old girl whose recorded pleas for help touched a nerve around the world."
2026	Garance Burke	Associated Press	"for an astonishing global investigation into state-of-the-art tools of mass surveillance, created in Silicon Valley, advanced in China and spreading worldwide before returning to America for secret new uses by the U.S. Border Patrol."
2026	Aniruddha Ghosal	Associated Press	"for an astonishing global investigation into state-of-the-art tools of mass surveillance, created in Silicon Valley, advanced in China and spreading worldwide before returning to America for secret new uses by the U.S. Border Patrol."
2026	Yael Grauer	Associated Press	"for an astonishing global investigation into state-of-the-art tools of mass surveillance, created in Silicon Valley, advanced in China and spreading worldwide before returning to America for secret new uses by the U.S. Border Patrol."
2026	Dake Kang	Associated Press	"for an astonishing global investigation into state-of-the-art tools of mass surveillance, created in Silicon Valley, advanced in China and spreading worldwide before returning to America for secret new uses by the U.S. Border Patrol."
2026	Byron Tau	Associated Press	"for an astonishing global investigation into state-of-the-art tools of mass surveillance, created in Silicon Valley, advanced in China and spreading worldwide before returning to America for secret new uses by the U.S. Border Patrol."
2026	Stephanie Nolen	The New York Times	"for cataloging in devastating detail the harm caused to vulnerable people across the developing world by the Trump administration's abrupt dismantling of U.S. humanitarian aid, which had fought disease and promoted good health for decades."
2026	Jared Malsin	The Wall Street Journal	"for its intimate, humanizing reporting that laid bare the Assad regime's atrocities against the Syrian people over 13 years of revolution and war."
2026	Staff	The Wall Street Journal	"for its intimate, humanizing reporting that laid bare the Assad regime's atrocities against the Syrian people over 13 years of revolution and war."
