= 2014 Pulitzer Prize =

Awards for journalism and related fields

The 2014 Pulitzer Prizes were awarded by the Pulitzer Prize Board for work during the 2013 calendar year. The deadline for entries was January 25, 2014. Prize winners and nominated finalists were announced on April 14, 2014.

The Washington Post and The Guardian US shared the Pulitzer Prize for Public Service, often considered the top prize for journalism. The two papers were honored for their coverage of the disclosures about surveillance done by the US National Security Agency. Edward Snowden, who leaked security documents to the two newspapers, said the award was "vindication for everyone who believes that the public has a role in government." Other journalism honored included the Boston Globe's coverage of the Boston Marathon bombings, Chris Hamby for investigative reporting, and Eli Saslow for explanatory reporting.

The Goldfinch by Donna Tartt won the Pulitzer Prize for Fiction. The judges described the novel, which took Tartt 11 years to write, as "a beautifully written coming-of-age novel with exquisitely drawn characters". In addition to the award itself, Tartt received a $100,000 cash prize. She said she was "surprised" and "very happy" to receive the award, her first major literary prize. Overall, the novel has drawn "mixed reviews" from literary critics. Other contenders for the fiction prize included The Son by Philipp Meyer and The Woman Who Lost Her Soul by Bob Shacochis. Vijay Seshadri won the Pulitzer Prize for Poetry for his collection 3 Sections. Other literary winners included The Internal Enemy by Alan Taylor, Toms River: A Story of Science and Salvation by Dan Fagin, and Megan Marshall's biography of Margaret Fuller.

== Prizes ==
There were 20 prizes awarded in 21 categories – no award in the category Feature Writing.

=== Journalism ===
Public Service
The Washington Post "for its revelation of widespread secret surveillance by the National Security Agency, marked by authoritative and insightful reports that helped the public understand how the disclosures fit into the larger framework of national security."
The Guardian US "for its revelation of widespread secret surveillance by the National Security Agency, helping through aggressive reporting to spark a debate about the relationship between the government and the public over issues of security and privacy."
Newsday, Long Island, N.Y., "for its use of in-depth reporting and digital tools to expose shootings, beatings and other concealed misconduct by some Long Island police officers, leading to the formation of a grand jury and an official review of police accountability."

Breaking News Reporting
The Boston Globe Staff "for its exhaustive and empathetic coverage of the Boston Marathon bombings and the ensuing manhunt that enveloped the city, using photography and a range of digital tools to capture the full impact of the tragedy."
The Arizona Republic Staff, "for its compelling coverage of a fast-moving wildfire that claimed the lives of 19 firefighters and destroyed more than a hundred homes, using an array of journalistic tools to tell the story."
The Washington Post Staff, "for its alert, in-depth coverage of the mass shooting at the Washington Navy Yard, employing a mix of platforms to tell a developing story with accuracy and sensitivity."

Investigative Reporting
Chris Hamby of The Center for Public Integrity, Washington, D.C. "for his reports on how some lawyers and doctors rigged a system to deny benefits to coal miners stricken with black lung disease, resulting in remedial legislative efforts."
Megan Twohey of Reuters, "for her exposure of an underground Internet marketplace where parents could bypass social welfare regulations and get rid of children they had adopted overseas but no longer wanted, the stories triggering governmental action to curb the practice."
Cynthia Hubert and Phillip Reese of The Sacramento Bee, "for their probe of a Las Vegas mental hospital that used commercial buses to "dump" more than 1,500 psychiatric patients in 48 states over five years, reporting that brought an end to the practice and the firing of hospital employees."

Explanatory Reporting
Eli Saslow of The Washington Post "for his unsettling and nuanced reporting on the prevalence of food stamps in post-recession America, forcing readers to grapple with issues of poverty and dependency."
Dennis Overbye of The New York Times, "for his authoritative illumination of the race by two competing teams of 3,000 scientists and technicians over a seven-year period to discover what physicists call the 'God particle'."
Les Zaitz of The Oregonian, Portland, "for chilling narratives that, at personal risk to him and his sources, revealed how lethal Mexican drug cartels infiltrated Oregon and other regions of the country."

Local Reporting
Will Hobson and Michael LaForgia of the Tampa Bay Times "for their relentless investigation into the squalid conditions that marked housing for the city's substantial homeless population, leading to swift reforms."
Joan Garrett McClane, Todd South, Doug Strickland and Mary Helen Miller of the Chattanooga Times Free Press, "for using an array of journalistic tools to explore the "no-snitch" culture that helps perpetuate a cycle of violence in one of the most dangerous cities in the South."
Rebecca D. O'Brien and Thomas Mashberg of The Record, Woodland Park, New Jersey, "for their jarring exposure of how heroin has permeated the suburbs of northern New Jersey, profiling addicts and anguished families and mapping the drug pipeline from South America to their community."

National Reporting
David Philipps of The Gazette, Colorado Springs, CO "for expanding the examination of how wounded combat veterans are mistreated, focusing on loss of benefits for life after discharge by the Army for minor offenses, stories augmented with digital tools and stirring congressional action."
John Emshwiller and Jeremy Singer-Vine of The Wall Street Journal, "for their reports and searchable database on the nation's often overlooked factories and research centers that once produced nuclear weapons and now pose contamination risks."
Jon Hilsenrath of The Wall Street Journal, "for his exploration of the Federal Reserve, a powerful but little understood national institution."

International Reporting
Jason Szep and Andrew R. C. Marshall of Reuters "for their courageous reports on the violent persecution of the Rohingya, a Muslim minority in Myanmar that, in efforts to flee the country, often falls victim to predatory human-trafficking networks."
Rukmini Callimachi of the Associated Press, "for her discovery and fearless exploration of internal documents that shattered myths and deepened understanding of the global terrorist network of al-Qaida."
Raja Abdulrahim and Patrick McDonnell of the Los Angeles Times, "for their vivid coverage of the Syrian civil war, showing at grave personal risk how both sides of the conflict contribute to the bloodshed, fear and corruption that define daily life."

Feature Writing
Scott Farwell of The Dallas Morning News, "for his story about a young woman's struggle to live a normal life after years of ghastly child abuse, an examination of human resilience in the face of depravity."
Christopher Goffard of the Los Angeles Times, "for his account of an ex-police officer's nine-day killing spree in Southern California, notable for its pacing, character development and rich detail."
Mark Johnson of the Milwaukee Journal Sentinel, "for his meticulously told tale about a group of first-year medical students in their gross anatomy class and the relationships they develop with one another and the nameless corpse on the table, an account enhanced by multimedia elements."

Commentary
Stephen Henderson of Detroit Free Press "for his columns on the financial crisis facing his hometown, written with passion and a stirring sense of place, sparing no one in their critique."
Kevin Cullen of The Boston Globe, "for his street-wise local columns that capture the spirit of a city, especially after its famed Marathon was devastated by terrorist bombings."
Lisa Falkenberg of the Houston Chronicle, "for her provocative metro columns written from the perspective of a sixth-generation Texan, often challenging the powerful and giving voice to the voiceless."

Criticism
Inga Saffron of The Philadelphia Inquirer "for her criticism of architecture that blends expertise, civic passion and sheer readability into arguments that consistently stimulate and surprise."
Mary McNamara of the Los Angeles Times, "for her trenchant and witty television criticism, engaging readers through essays and reviews that feature a conversational style and the force of fresh ideas."
Jen Graves of The Stranger, Seattle, "for her visual arts criticism that, with elegant and vivid description, informs readers about how to look at the complexities of contemporary art and the world in which it's made."

Editorial Writing
Editorial Staff of The Oregonian, Portland "for its lucid editorials that explain the urgent but complex issue of rising pension costs, notably engaging readers and driving home the link between necessary solutions and their impact on everyday lives."
Dante Ramos of The Boston Globe, "for his evocative editorials urging Boston to become a more modern, around-the-clock city by shedding longtime restrictions and removing bureaucratic obstacles that can sap its vitality."
Andie Dominick of The Des Moines Register, "for her diligent editorials challenging Iowa's arcane licensing laws that regulate occupations ranging from cosmetologists to dentists and often protect practitioners more than the public."

Editorial Cartooning
Kevin Siers of The Charlotte Observer "for his thought provoking cartoons drawn with a sharp wit and bold artistic style."
David Horsey of the Los Angeles Times, "for his wide ranging cartoons that blend skillful caricature with irreverence, causing readers both to laugh and think."
Pat Bagley of The Salt Lake Tribune, "for his adroit use of images and words that cut to the core of often emotional issues for his readership."

Breaking News Photography
Tyler Hicks of The New York Times "for his compelling pictures that showed skill and bravery in documenting the unfolding terrorist attack at Westgate mall in Kenya."
John Tlumacki and David L. Ryan of The Boston Globe, "for their searing photographs that captured the shock, chaos and heroism after the bloody Boston Marathon bombings."
Goran Tomasevic of Reuters, "for his sequence of photographs that chronicle two hours of fierce combat on the rebel frontline in Syria's civil war."

Feature Photography
Josh Haner of The New York Times "for his moving essay on a Boston Marathon bomb blast victim who lost most of both legs and now is painfully rebuilding his life."
Lacy Atkins of the San Francisco Chronicle, "for her revealing portrait of an Oakland school's efforts to help African-American boys avoid neighborhood risks and profit from education."
Michael Williamson of The Washington Post, "for his portfolio of pictures exploring the multi-faceted impact of the nation's food stamp program on 47 million recipients."

=== Letters, Drama, and Music ===
Fiction
The Goldfinch by Donna Tartt (Little, Brown), "a beautifully written coming-of-age novel with exquisitely drawn characters that follows a grieving boy's entanglement with a small famous painting that has eluded destruction, a book that stimulates the mind and touches the heart."
The Son by Philipp Meyer (Ecco), "a sweeping multi-generational novel that illuminates the violence and enterprise of the American West by tracing a Texas family's passage from lethal frontier perils to immense oil-boom wealth."
The Woman Who Lost Her Soul by Bob Shacochis (Atlantic Monthly Press), "a novel spanning 50 years and three continents that explores the murky world of American foreign policy before 9/11, using provocative themes to raise difficult moral questions."

Drama
The Flick by Annie Baker, "a thoughtful drama with well-crafted characters that focuses on three employees of a Massachusetts art-house movie theater, rendering lives rarely seen on the stage."
The (curious case of the) Watson Intelligence by Madeleine George, "a cleverly constructed play that uses several historical moments – from the 1800s to the 2010s – to meditate on the technological advancements that bring people together and tear them apart."
Fun Home by Lisa Kron and Jeanine Tesori, "a poignant musical adaptation of a graphic memoir by cartoonist Alison Bechdel, exploring sexual identity amid complicated family constraints and relationships."

History
The Internal Enemy: Slavery and War in Virginia, 1772–1832 by Alan Taylor (W. W. Norton), "a meticulous and insightful account of why runaway slaves in the colonial era were drawn to the British side as potential liberators."
A Dreadful Deceit: The Myth of Race from the Colonial Era to Obama's America by Jacqueline Jones (Basic Books), "a deeply researched examination of how race as a social invention has retained its power to organize, mark and harm the lives of Americans."
Command and Control: Nuclear Weapons, the Damascus Accident, and the Illusion of Safety by Eric Schlosser (The Penguin Press), "a chilling history of the management of America's nuclear arsenal, exploring the fateful challenges and chronicling the "near misses" that could have triggered a cataclysm."

Biography or Autobiography
Margaret Fuller: A New American Life by Megan Marshall (Houghton Mifflin Harcourt), "a richly researched book that tells the remarkable story of a 19th century author, journalist, critic and pioneering advocate of women's rights who died in a shipwreck."
Jonathan Swift: His Life and His World by Leo Damrosch (Yale University Press), "a seminal work that illuminates the famous yet enigmatic satirist who was also a crucial figure in 18th century Anglo-Irish politics."
Karl Marx: A Nineteenth-Century Life by Jonathan Sperber (Liveright), "an impressively researched work that provides a fresh perspective on Marx and his ideas by placing him in the social and intellectual swirl of the 1800s."

Poetry
3 Sections by Vijay Seshadri (Graywolf Press), "a compelling collection of poems that examine human consciousness, from birth to dementia, in a voice that is by turns witty and grave, compassionate and remorseless."
The Sleep of Reason by Morri Creech (The Waywiser Press), "a book of masterly poems that capture the inner experience of a man in mid-life who is troubled by mortality and the passage of time, traditional themes that are made to feel new."
The Big Smoke by Adrian Matejka (Penguin), "an imaginative work by a commanding poet who engages the history and mythology of larger-than-life boxer Jack Johnson."

General Nonfiction
Toms River: A Story of Science and Salvation by Dan Fagin (Bantam Books), "a book that deftly combines investigative reporting and historical research to probe a New Jersey seashore town's cluster of childhood cancers linked to water and air pollution."
The Blood Telegram: Nixon, Kissinger, and a Forgotten Genocide by Gary J. Bass (Alfred A. Knopf), "a disquieting exploration of the role played by the American president and his national security advisor in the 1971 Pakistani civil war, a bloodbath that killed hundreds of thousands and created millions of refugees."
The Insurgents: David Petraeus and the Plot to Change the American Way of War by Fred Kaplan (Simon & Schuster), "an engrossing look at how a tenacious general became the ringleader of efforts to reshape America's military strategy in the post-Cold War age."

Pulitzer Prize for Music
Become Ocean by John Luther Adams (Taiga Press/Theodore Front Musical Literature), "a haunting orchestral work that suggests a relentless tidal surge, evoking thoughts of melting polar ice and rising sea levels."
The Gospel According to the Other Mary by John Adams, "a monumental oratorio about the final period of Christ's life that is marked by impassioned music "sometimes forceful, sometimes lyrical" and an ingenious variety of evocative sounds."
Invisible Cities by Christopher Cerrone, "a captivating opera based on a novel by Italo Calvino in which Marco Polo regales Kublai Khan with tales of fantastical cities, adapted into an imaginary sonic landscape."

=== Special Citation ===
Not awarded in 2014.
