= 1995 Pulitzer Prize =

Awards for journalism and related fields

The Pulitzer Prizes for 1995 were announced on April 18, 1995:

== Journalism awards ==
- Public Service:
  - Virgin Islands Daily News, St. Thomas, for its disclosure of the links between the region's rampant crime rate and corruption in the local criminal justice system. The reporting largely the work of Melvin Claxton, initiated political reforms.
- Spot News Reporting:
  - Staff of the Los Angeles Times, for its reporting on January 17, 1994, of the chaos and devastation in the aftermath of the Northridge earthquake.
- Investigative Reporting:
  - Brian Donovan and Stephanie Saul, Newsday, Long Island, New York, for their stories that revealed disability-pension abuses by local police.
- Explanatory Journalism:
  - Leon Dash, staff writer, and Lucian Perkins, photographer of The Washington Post, for their profile of a District of Columbia family's struggle with destructive cycles of poverty, illiteracy, crime and drug abuse.
- Beat Reporting:
  - David Shribman, The Boston Globe, for his analytical reporting on Washington developments and the national scene.
- National Reporting:
  - Tony Horwitz of The Wall Street Journal, for stories about working conditions in low-wage America.
- International Reporting:
  - Mark Fritz, Associated Press, for his reporting on the ethnic violence and slaughter in Rwanda.
- Feature Writing:
  - Ron Suskind, The Wall Street Journal, for his stories about inner-city honors students in Washington, D.C., and their determination to survive and prosper.
- Commentary:
  - Jim Dwyer, Newsday, Long Island, New York, for his compelling and compassionate columns about New York City.
- Criticism:
  - Margo Jefferson, The New York Times, for her book reviews and other cultural criticism.
- Editorial Writing:
  - Jeffrey Good, St. Petersburg (Fla.) Times, for his editorial campaign urging reform of Florida's probate system for settling estates.
- Editorial Cartooning:
  - Mike Luckovich, The Atlanta Constitution
- Spot News Photography:
  - Carol Guzy of The Washington Post, for her series of photographs illustrating the crisis in Haiti and its aftermath.
- Feature Photography:
  - Staff of Associated Press, for its portfolio of photographs chronicling the horror and devastation in Rwanda.

== Letters awards ==
- Fiction:
  - The Stone Diaries by Carol Shields (Viking)
- History:
  - No Ordinary Time: Franklin and Eleanor Roosevelt: The Home Front in World War II by Doris Kearns Goodwin (Simon & Schuster)
- Biography or Autobiography:
  - Harriet Beecher Stowe: A Life by Joan D. Hedrick (Oxford University Press)
- Poetry:
  - The Simple Truth by Philip Levine (Alfred A. Knopf)
- General Nonfiction:
  - The Beak Of The Finch: A Story Of Evolution In Our Time by Jonathan Weiner (Alfred A. Knopf)

== Arts awards ==
- Drama:
  - The Young Man From Atlanta by Horton Foote (Dutton)
- Music:
  - Stringmusic by Morton Gould (G. Schirmer)

Premiered on March 10, 1994, by the National Symphony Orchestra at The John F. Kennedy Center, Washington, D.C.
