= 1961 Pulitzer Prize =

Awards for journalism and related fields

The Pulitzer Prizes for 1961 are:

== Journalism awards ==
- Public Service:
  - The Amarillo Globe-Times, for "exposing a breakdown in local law enforcement with resultant punitive action that swept lax officials from their posts and brought about the election of a reform slate. The newspaper thus exerted its civic leadership in the finest tradition of journalism."
- Local Reporting, Edition Time:
  - Sanche de Gramont of the New York Herald Tribune, "for his moving account of the death of Leonard Warren on the Metropolitan Opera stage".
- Local Reporting, No Edition time:
  - Edgar May of The Buffalo Evening News, for his 14-part series about New York's public welfare services, "Our Costly Dilemma", which "brought about reforms that attracted nationwide attention".
- National Reporting:
  - Edward R. Cony of The Wall Street Journal, "for his analysis of a timber transaction which drew the attention of the public to problems of business ethics".
- International Reporting:
  - Lynn Heinzerling of the Associated Press, "for his reporting, under extraordinarily difficult conditions, of the early stages of the Congo crisis and his keen analysis of events in other parts of Africa".
- Editorial Writing:
  - William J. Dorvillier of The San Juan Star, "for his editorials on clerical interference in the 1960 gubernatorial election in Puerto Rico".
- Editorial Cartooning:
  - Carey Orr of the Chicago Tribune, "for his long and distinguished career as an editorial cartoonist, as exemplified by a cartoon captioned, 'The Kindly Tiger', published on October 8, 1960".

"Tokyo Stabbing", the prize-winning photograph

- Photography:
  - Yasushi Nagao of Mainichi (Tokyo), for "Tokyo Stabbing", a photograph of the assassination of Japanese politician Inejiro Asanuma, distributed in the United States by United Press International.

== Letters, Music and Drama Awards ==
- Fiction:
  - To Kill a Mockingbird by Harper Lee (Lippincott)
- Drama:
  - All the Way Home by Tad Mosel (Obolensky)
- History:
  - Between War and Peace: The Potsdam Conference by Herbert Feis (Princeton Univ. Press)
- Biography or Autobiography:
  - Charles Sumner and the Coming of the Civil War by David Donald (Knopf)
- Poetry:
  - Times Three: Selected Verse From Three Decades by Phyllis McGinley (Viking)
- Music:
  - Symphony No. 7 by Walter Piston (Associated Music Publishers), first performed by the Philadelphia Orchestra on February 10, 1961, and commissioned by the Philadelphia Orchestra Association.
- Special Citation:
  - American Heritage Picture History of the Civil War, as a distinguished example of American book publishing.
