= 1945 Pulitzer Prize =

Awards for journalism and related fields

The following are the Pulitzer Prizes for 1945.

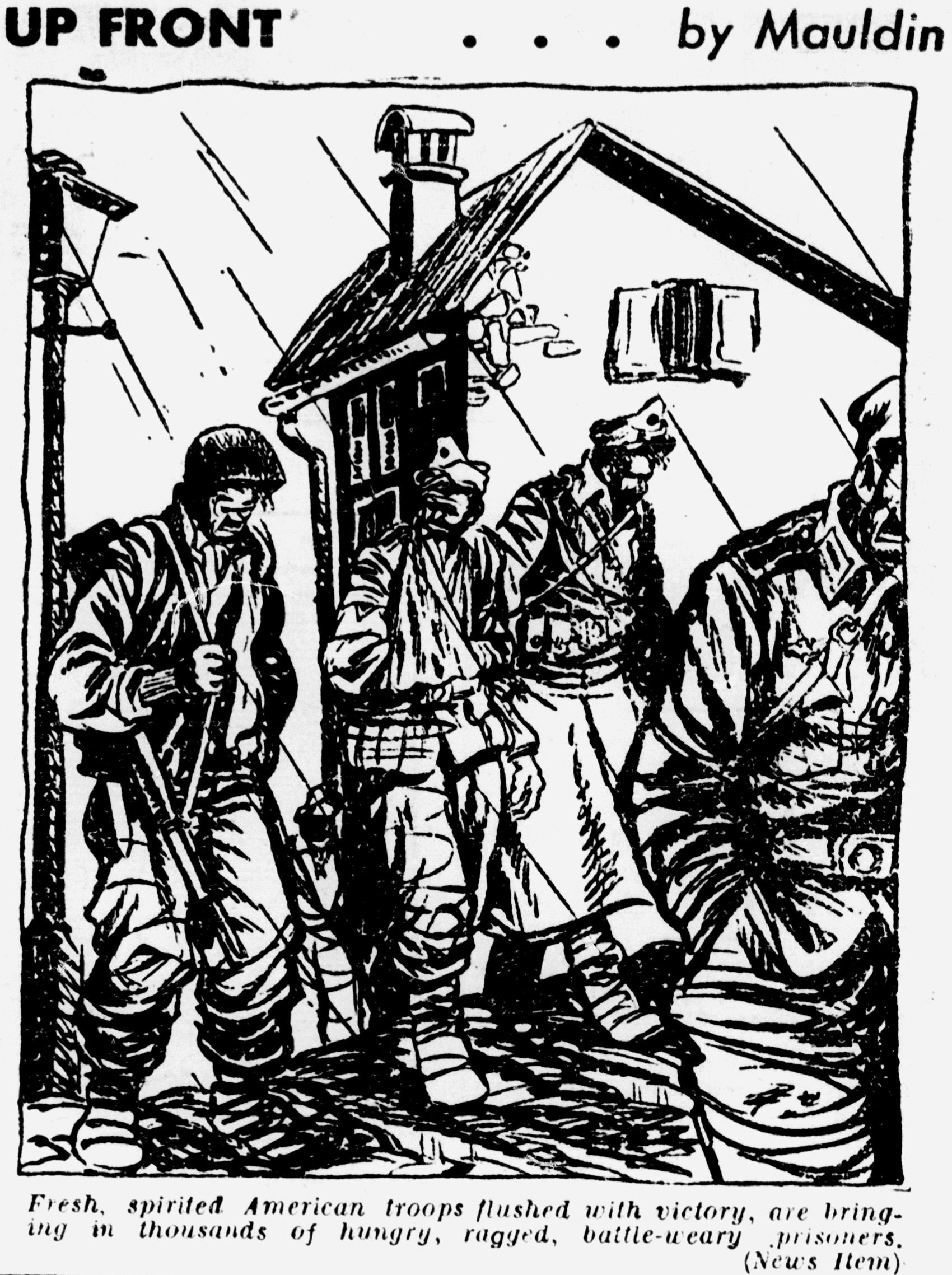
The cartoon cited as an exemplar of Bill Mauldin's work

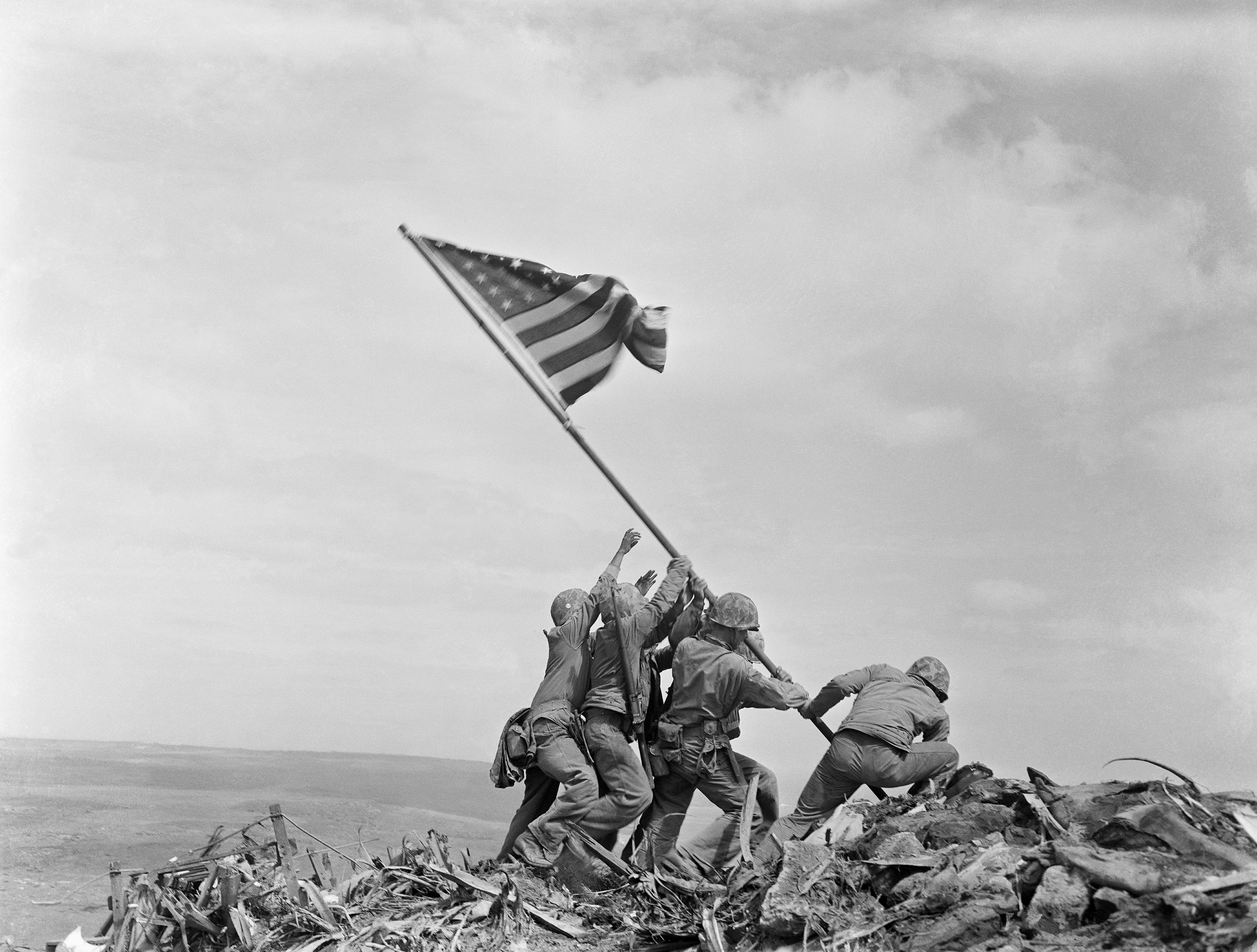
Raising the Flag on Iwo Jima, the prize-winning photograph

== Journalism awards ==
- Public Service:
  - The Detroit Free Press for its investigation of legislative graft and corruption in the Michigan state government.
- Reporting:
  - Jack S. McDowell of the San Francisco Call for his campaign to encourage blood donations.
- Correspondence:
  - Harold Boyle of the Associated Press for distinguished war correspondence during the year 1944.
- Telegraphic Reporting (National):
  - James Reston of The New York Times for his news dispatches and interpretive articles on the Dumbarton Oaks security conference.
- Telegraphic Reporting (International):
  - Mark S. Watson of The Baltimore Sun for his distinguished reporting during the year 1944 from Washington, London and the fronts in Sicily, Italy, and France.
- Editorial Writing:
  - George W. Potter of the Providence Journal-Bulletin for his editorials published during the calendar year 1944, especially for his editorials on the subject of freedom of the press.
- Editorial Cartooning:
  - Sergeant Bill Mauldin of United Feature Syndicate, Inc. for distinguished service as a cartoonist, as exemplified by the cartoon entitled, "Fresh, spirited American troops, flushed with victory, are bringing in thousands of hungry, ragged, battle-weary prisoners", in the series entitled, Up Front With Mauldin.
- Photography:
  - Joe Rosenthal of the Associated Press for his photograph of the Marines planting the American flag on Mount Suribachi on Iwo Jima.
- Special Citation:
  - The cartographers of the American press for maps of the war fronts that have helped notably to clarify and increase public information on the progress of the Armies and Navies engaged.

== Letters, Drama and Music Awards ==
- Novel:
  - A Bell for Adano by John Hersey (Knopf)
- Drama:
  - Harvey by Mary Chase (Dramatists)
- History:
  - Unfinished Business by Stephen Bonsal (Doubleday)
- Biography or Autobiography:
  - George Bancroft: Brahmin Rebel by Russel Blaine Nye (Knopf)
- Poetry:
  - V-Letter and Other Poems by Karl Shapiro (Reynal)
- Music:
  - Appalachian Spring by Aaron Copland (Boosey & Hawkes) a ballet written for and presented by Martha Graham and group, commissioned by Mrs. E. S. Coolidge, first presented at the Library of Congress, Washington, D.C. October, 1944
