= Frances Lewine =

American journalist

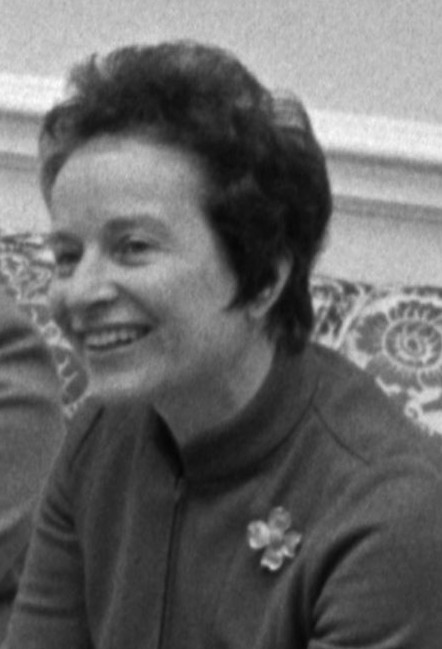
- Lewine in 1973
- Born: January 20, 1921; New York City
- Died: January 19, 2008 (aged 86)
- Education: Hunter College
- Occupation: Journalist
- Notable credit(s): AP, CNN

Frances Lewine (January 20, 1921 – January 19, 2008) was an American journalist and White House correspondent.

== Biography ==
Lewine was born January 20, 1921, in Far Rockaway, Queens. She and her brother spent much of their childhood there in an extended family household which included their first cousins Richard Feynman and Joan Feynman.

Lewine attended Hunter College, where she edited the college newspaper. She worked for the Courier-News in Plainfield, New Jersey before joining the Associated Press's New Jersey bureau.

She joined the Associated Press White House press corps in 1956, "when another woman had reached 55 and had to retire." In March 1962, she traveled with the Kennedys as part of the press contingent on their world tour.

After the Equal Employment Opportunity Commission (EEOC) determined that AP was violating the 1964 Civil Rights Act (only 7% of the AP's reporters were women in 1973), Lewine together with Shirley Christian and five other women reporters filed a complaint with the EEOC. By the time the case was settled in the women's favor in 1983, the seven plaintiffs shared a payout of $83,120 out of AP's $2 million settlement, which also included back pay for other Black and women journalists at AP.

Lewine was also active in the struggle to persuade the National Press Club and the Gridiron Club to open their membership to women reporters. Women were finally admitted to the Press Club starting in 1971; when the Gridiron Club started admitting women in 1975, Lewine and Helen Thomas were the first two women members.

In 1976, Lewine asked President Gerald Ford a two-part question that was later described by Ford's Press Secretary Ron Nessen as "the worst misuse of a question at a presidential news conference to advocate a personal point of view." The Journalism and Women Symposium described her question as follows:

...she asked President Gerald Ford at a televised news conference whether he agreed with the administration's guidelines urging federal officials not to patronize segregated facilities. Ford said he did. Then Fran asked him why he played golf every week at Burning Tree Country Club, which still refused to admit women at that time.

Ford treated the question as a joke, and quickly moved on to another reporter, but the White House and Lewine's editors at AP were angry. Lewine speculated that AP took her off their White House team because of that question.

In 1977, after covering the administrations of six presidents, Lewine left the AP, taking a job in Jimmy Carter's administration as the deputy director of public affairs for the Transportation Department. In 1981, she joined CNN as a field producer and assignment editor.

Lewine was president of the Women's National Press Club and advocated for equality for women journalists. She expressed disappointment in her own assignments at the White House, where she reported on social events and stories about the first family, noting that she was not allowed to cover the president as were her male colleagues.

She died in January 2008 of an apparent stroke.
