= 2021 Pulitzer Prize =

Awards for journalism and related fields

The 2021 Pulitzer Prizes were awarded by the Pulitzer Prize Board for work during the 2020 calendar year on June 11, 2021. The awards highlighted coverage of the COVID-19 pandemic, racial unrest, and other major stories in the U.S. that year. Several publications, including The Atlantic and BuzzFeed News, received their first Pulitzers.

== Prizes ==
Winners and finalists for the prizes are listed below, with the winners marked in bold.

=== Journalism ===
Public Service
**The New York Times**, "for courageous, prescient and sweeping coverage of the coronavirus pandemic that exposed racial and economic inequities, government failures in the U.S. and beyond, and filled a data vacuum that helped local governments, healthcare providers, businesses and individuals to be better prepared and protected."
ProPublica, "for aggressive, insightful and influential coverage of the coronavirus pandemic that repeatedly exposed flaws and shortcomings in the ways federal and state agencies and corporate America handled the crisis, prompting fast government response."
The Courier-Journal, "for its unflinching, comprehensive and impactful coverage of the killing of Breonna Taylor and the legacy of systemic racism in the police force and other civic institutions in Louisville, which helped to spur important reforms."

Breaking News Reporting
**Staff of The Star Tribune**, "for its urgent, authoritative and nuanced coverage of the death of George Floyd at the hands of police in Minneapolis and of the reverberations that followed."
Helen Branswell, Andrew Joseph, and Sharon Begley of Stat, "for their prescient, expert and accessible coverage of the emergence of COVID-19, sounding the alarm on the potential spread and potency of the virus."
Staff of The Courier-Journal "for exclusive coverage that contradicted police narratives in the killing of Breonna Taylor, and for its sensitive and innovative coverage of the aftermath".

Investigative Reporting
**Matt Rocheleau, Vernal Coleman, Laura Crimaldi, Evan Allen and Brendan McCarthy of The Boston Globe**, "for reporting that uncovered a systematic failure by state governments to share information about dangerous truck drivers that could have kept them off the road, prompting immediate reforms."
Dake Kang and the staff of the Associated Press "for a penetrating investigation of China's state secrecy and its fatal consequences, reflected in the country’s early response to the coronavirus outbreak and in human rights abuses against the Uighurs."
Maggie Marson and Robin McDowell of the Associated Press, "for their compelling examination of the abusive practices of international palm oil producers, including forced labor targeting women and children, culminating in congressional oversight and an import ban."

Explanatory Reporting
**Andrew Chung, Lawrence Hurley, Andrea Januta, Jaimi Dowdell, and Jackie Botts of Reuters**, "for an exhaustive examination, powered by a pioneering data analysis of U.S. federal court cases, of the obscure legal doctrine of “qualified immunity" and how it shields police who use excessive force from prosecution."
**Ed Yong of The Atlantic** "for a series of lucid, definitive pieces on the COVID-19 pandemic that anticipated the course of the disease, synthesized the complex challenges the country faced, illuminated the U.S. government’s failures and provided clear and accessible context for the scientific and human challenges it posed."
Megha Rajagopalan, Alison Killing and Christo Buschek of BuzzFeed News, "for a series of clear and compelling stories that used satellite imagery and architectural expertise, as well as interviews with two dozen former prisoners, to identify a vast new infrastructure built by the Chinese government for the mass detention of Muslims." (Moved to the International Reporting category, where it was also entered and ultimately won in)

Local Reporting
**Kathleen McGrory and Neil Bedi of The Tampa Bay Times**, "for resourceful, creative reporting that exposed how a powerful and politically connected sheriff built a secretive intelligence operation that harassed residents and used grades and child welfare records to profile schoolchildren."
Jack Dolan and Brittny Mejia of the Los Angeles Times, "for exposing failures in Los Angeles County’s safety-net healthcare system that resulted in months-long wait times for patients, including some who died before getting appointments with specialists."
Staff of The Post and Courier, "for an ambitious look at how water levels in the city were rising faster than previously thought that also explored the broader social, environmental and regulatory challenges posed by climate change."

National Reporting
**Staffs of The Marshall Project, AL.com, The Indianapolis Star, and the Invisible Institute**, "for a year-long investigation of K-9 units and the damage that police dogs inflict on Americans, including innocent citizens and police officers, prompting numerous statewide reforms."
Staff of The New York Times, "for detailed reporting on how the Trump administration consistently failed to respond properly or adequately to the coronavirus threat, including downplaying its seriousness."
Staff of The Wall Street Journal "for its series of stories documenting how nursing home residents were hit particularly hard by the coronavirus pandemic, partially because of improper decisions made by government officials."

International Reporting
**Megha Rajagopalan, Alison Killing and Christo Buschek of BuzzFeed News**, "for a series of clear and compelling stories that used satellite imagery and architectural expertise, as well as interviews with two dozen former prisoners, to identify a vast new infrastructure built by the Chinese government for the mass detention of Muslims." (Moved from the Explanatory Reporting category, where it was also entered and nominated)
BuzzFeed News and the International Consortium of Investigative Journalists, "for a massive reporting project that yielded sweeping revelations about the ongoing role of some of the world’s biggest banks in facilitating international money laundering and the trafficking of goods and people, corruption that continues to frustrate regulators across the world".
Staff of The New York Times, "for a masterful synthesis of stellar writing, powerful images and engaging interactives that illustrated how the world was unprepared for a fast-moving global pandemic — and failed to contain it".
Staff of The Wall Street Journal, "for an authoritative and deeply reported portrait of China’s nationalist leader Xi Jinping and his increasingly authoritarian control of the state, its economy, and politics, conducted even after the news organization was expelled from the country".

Feature Writing
**Mitchell S. Jackson, freelance contributor for Runner's World**, "for a deeply affecting account of the killing of Ahmaud Arbery that combined vivid writing, thorough reporting and personal experience to shed light on systemic racism in America."
**Nadja Drost, freelance contributor for The California Sunday Magazine**, "for a brave and gripping account of global migration that documents a group’s journey on foot through the Darién Gap, one of the most dangerous migrant routes in the world."
Greg Jaffe of The Washington Post, "for deeply reported stories that powerfully depict the suffering and dislocation endured by Americans who lost their jobs after the sudden collapse of South Florida’s tourist economy in the pandemic."

Commentary
**Michael Paul Williams of the Richmond Times-Dispatch**, "for penetrating and historically insightful columns that guided Richmond, a former capital of the Confederacy, through the painful and complicated process of dismantling the city's monuments to white supremacy."
Melinda Henneberger of The Kansas City Star, "for tenacious and deeply reported columns on failures in the criminal justice system, forcefully arguing how systemic problems and abuses affect the larger community."
Roy S. Johnson of Alabama Media Group, "for evocative columns on race and remembrance written with style, urgency, and moral clarity."

Criticism
**Wesley Morris of The New York Times**, "for unrelentingly relevant and deeply engaged criticism on the intersection of race and culture in America, written in a singular style, alternately playful and profound."
Craig Jenkins of New York magazine, "for writing on a range of popular topics, including social media, music and comedy, contending with the year’s disarray and exploring how culture and conversation can both flourish and break down online".
Mark Swed of the Los Angeles Times, "for a series of critical essays that broke through the silence of the pandemic to recommend an eclectic array of recordings as entertainment and solace essential to the moment, drawing deep connections to seven centuries of classical music".

Editorial Writing
**Robert Greene of the Los Angeles Times**, "for editorials on policing, bail reform, prisons and mental health that clearly and holistically examined the Los Angeles criminal justice system."
Alan Wirzbicki and Rachelle G. Cohen of The Boston Globe, "for editorials that addressed a controversial local zoning fight, centering the legacy of restrictive housing laws in America’s ongoing conversation about equity, inclusion and opportunity".
Lee Hockstader of The Washington Post, "for a series of editorials that pushed for accountability in the shooting and killing of an unarmed man by U.S. Park Police three years earlier".

Breaking News Photography
**Photography Staff of the Associated Press**, "for a collection of photographs from multiple U.S. cities that cohesively captures the country's response to the death of George Floyd."
Hassan Ammar, Hussein Malla and Felipe Dana of Associated Press, "for a series of images documenting the uncertainty and devastation following a seaport blast that rocked Beirut.
Joshua Irwandi of National Geographic, "for a starkly haunting photograph of a solitary coronavirus victim in an Indonesian hospital, wrapped in plastic and awaiting a body bag."

Feature Photography
**Emilio Morenatti of the Associated Press**, "for a poignant series of photographs that takes viewers into the lives of the elderly in Spain struggling during the COVID-19 pandemic."
Staff of Getty Images, "for thorough coverage of the impact of the COVID-19 pandemic on the global community."
Tyler Hicks of The New York Times, "for searing images that capture the toll of the coronavirus deep in Brazil’s Amazon, and how it ravaged the region’s indigenous people."

Audio Reporting
**Lisa Hagen, Chris Haxel, Graham Smith and Robert Little of NPR**, "for an investigative series on 'no compromise' gun rights activists that illuminated the profound differences and deepening schism between American conservatives."
Staff for National Public Radio, "for courageous on-the-ground reporting on the assassination of Iranian General Qasem Soleimani and its implications around the globe.".
Staffs of the Invisible Institute, The Intercept, and Topic Studios, "for Somebody, a dogged and searing investigation of the murder of a young Black man in Chicago and the institutional indifference surrounding it."

=== Letters, Drama, and Music ===
Drama
**The Hot Wing King** by Katori Hall, "a funny, deeply felt consideration of Black masculinity and how it is perceived, filtered through the experiences of a loving gay couple and their extended family as they prepare for a culinary competition."
Circle Jerk by Michael Breslin and Patrick Foley, "a contemporary satire featuring outrageous situations and language repurposed from the internet to skewer online culture and question what identities we have permission to claim."
Stew by Zora Howard, "an intimate, tightly constructed drama about three generations of Black women over the course of one day, and the violence they are forced to live with, absorb and attempt to overcome."

Music
**Stride** by Tania León, "a musical journey full of surprise, with powerful brass and rhythmic motifs that incorporate Black music traditions from the US and the Caribbean into a Western orchestral fabric."
Data Lords by Maria Schneider, "an enveloping musical landscape of light and shadow, rendered by the many personalities of a large jazz ensemble, reflecting the promise of a digital paradise contrasted by a concentration of power and the loss of privacy."
Place by Ted Hearne, "a brave and powerful work, marked by effective vocal writing and multiple musical genres, that confronts issues of gentrification and displacement in Fort Greene, Brooklyn."

History
**Franchise: The Golden Arches in Black America** by Marcia Chatelain, "a nuanced account of the complicated role the fast-food industry plays in African-American communities, a portrait of race and capitalism that masterfully illustrates how the fight for civil rights has been intertwined with the fate of Black businesses."
The Deviant's War: The Homosexual vs. the United States by Eric Cervini, "a painstakingly researched and engagingly written study of the pre-Stonewall fight for gay rights in America, told through the life and unprecedented legal efforts of astronomer Franklin Edward Kameny."
The Three-Cornered War: The Union, the Confederacy, and Native Peoples in the Fight for the West by Megan Kate Nelson, "a lively and well-crafted Civil War narrative that expands understanding of the conflict’s Western theaters, where pivotal struggles for land, resources and influence presaged the direction of the country as a whole."

Poetry
**Postcolonial Love Poem** by Natalie Diaz, "a collection of tender, heart-wrenching and defiant poems that explore what it means to love and be loved in an America beset by conflict."
A Treatise on Stars by Mei-mei Berssenbrugge, "a book of meditative and expansive poems that illuminate the interconnectedness of life forms and the spirituality of our natural environment."
In the Lateness of the World by Carolyn Forché: "narrative lyrics resonant with imagery of beauty and horror that transcend the personal to offer a larger vision of our global condition."

General Nonfiction
**Wilmington's Lie: The Murderous Coup of 1898 and the Rise of White Supremacy** by David Zucchino, "a gripping account of the overthrow of the elected government of a Black-majority North Carolina city after Reconstruction that untangles a complicated set of power dynamics cutting across race, class and gender."
Minor Feelings: An Asian American Reckoning by Cathy Park Hong
Yellow Bird: Oil, Murder, and a Woman's Search for Justice in Indian Country, by Sierra Crane Murdoch

Biography
**The Dead Are Arising: The Life of Malcolm X** by Les Payne and Tamara Payne, "a powerful and revelatory account of the civil rights activist, built from dozens of interviews, offering insight into his character, beliefs and the forces that shaped him."
Red Comet: The Short Life and Blazing Art of Sylvia Plath, by Heather Clark, "a profoundly researched and illuminating portrait of the influential poet whose life and art mirrored the intellectual, political and sexual awakenings of the era."
Stranger in the Shogun's City: A Japanese Woman and Her World by Amy Stanley, "an exquisitely written profile of a 19th century Japanese woman, reconstructed from hundreds of documents, that captures not only the arc of one life, but the society of the Edo period in transition."

Fiction
**The Night Watchman** by Louise Erdrich, "a majestic, polyphonic novel about a community’s efforts to halt the proposed displacement and elimination of several Native American tribes in the 1950s, rendered with dexterity and imagination."
A Registry of My Passage Upon the Earth by Daniel Mason, "a collection of stories with themes of class division, the artist's role in society and our need for love and belonging, reflecting a prowess with language and a mastery of the short form."
Telephone by Percival Everett, "a novel of narrative ingenuity that includes both a heartbreaking illness and a crime story in its exploration of discontent, loss and the possibility of redemption."

== Special Citations ==
A Special Citation was awarded to Darnella Frazier, "for courageously recording the murder of George Floyd, a video that spurred protests against police brutality around the world, highlighting the crucial role of citizens in journalists' quest for truth and justice."
