= Pete Carey =

American Pulitzer Prize-winning journalist

- Born: April 2, 1940 (age 86); San Francisco
- Occupation: journalist

Pete Carey is an American Pulitzer Prize-winning journalist. Carey worked at the Mercury News California from 1967 to 2016 as a projects reporter and investigative correspondent, covering the defense industry, the rise of Silicon Valley, the financial affairs of Ferdinand Marcos and other topics.

== Early life ==
Pete Carey was born in San Francisco and raised in Berkeley. After receiving an economics degree from the University of California, Carey started his journalistic career as a reporter for the San Francisco Examiner in 1964. The following year, he joined the Livermore Independent, as a reporter and editor for three years. He then joined the San Jose Mercury News as an aerospace and technology reporter, later specializing in investigations and special projects. In 1983–1984, Carey was a Professional Journalism Fellow at Stanford University.

== Career ==
For the San Jose Mercury News, Carey undertook a number of local, national, and international assignments, ranging from fraud and waste involving American charities in Mexico immigration and the influence of money on the California Legislature. In 1985, he investigated the transfer of money out of the Philippines by Ferdinand Marcos and his associates. The series of stories, which was written in collaboration with Katherine Ellison and Lewis Simons, was awarded the Pulitzer Prize for International Reporting in 1986. Four years later, Carey's investigation of the collapse of a freeway structure during the Loma Prieta earthquake helped the Mercury News garner another Pulitzer Prize.

By 2020, Pete Carey retired from the San Jose Mercury News to mentor grantees of the program of the Fund for Investigative Journalism.

== Awards ==
- Penny-Missouri Award (1985);
- San Francisco Press Club Award (1985);
- Mark Twain Award
- George Polk Award (1986);
- Investigative Reporters and Editors Award (1986);
- Jessie Meriton White Service Award (1986);
- Thomas M. Stakes Award, Washington Journalism Center (1991);
- Malcolm Forbes Award, Overseas Press Club of America (1993);
- Gerald Loeb Award, Anderson Graduate School of Management (1993);
- Best of the West Award (1993, 1995);
- Public Service Award, California Newspaper Publishers Association (1996);
- Fairbanks Award for Public Service, Associated Press (1996);
- Excellence in Journalism Award, the Society of Professional Journalists (2016).
- Alumni Member, International Consortium of Investigative Journalists (2024)

== Books ==
- Brennan (1999). Who's who of Pulitzer Prize Winners. Westport: Greenwood Publishing Group. p. 666. ISBN 9781573561112.
- Saur, K. G. (2011). International Reporting 1928-1985: From the Activities of the League of Nations to present-day Global Problems. Vienna: De Gruyter. p. 437. ISBN 978-3598301711.
