= Jason Szep =

American journalist with Reuters

- Born: Scituate, Massachusetts, U.S.
- Education: University of Toronto
- Occupation: Journalist
- Writing career
- Notable awards: Pulitzer Prize (2014), (2026)

Jason Szep is an American journalist and editor with Reuters. He won the 2014 Pulitzer Prize for International Reporting with Andrew R.C. Marshall for reporting on the persecution of the Rohingya in Myanmar and was a member of the Reuters team awarded the 2026 Pulitzer Prize for National Reporting.

== Early life and education ==
Born in Scituate, Massachusetts, Szep is the son of two-time Pulitzer Prize-winning political cartoonist Paul Szep, formerly of The Boston Globe. Jason Szep graduated from Brookline High School and studied literature at Bard College and University of Toronto.

== Career ==
Szep has reported from across Asia and North America on a wide range of subjects since joining Reuters in Toronto, with postings in Sydney, Hong Kong, Singapore, Tokyo, Boston, Bangkok and Washington. He has held a number of senior positions at Reuters, including Boston Bureau Chief, Southeast Asia Bureau Chief, International Affairs Editor, and U.S. National Affairs Editor in Washington. Szep is currently International Political Investigations Editor.

His reporting has focused on human rights, criminal justice, immigration and national politics. Among his best-known projects are investigations into the persecution of the Rohingya in Myanmar, deaths in American jails, threats against election workers following the 2020 U.S. presidential election, and sexual exploitation and child-safety failures on the subscription-content platform OnlyFans. Szep also served as the series editor of Reuters' Revenge of Donald Trump project, which was awarded the 2026 Pulitzer Prize for National Reporting.

== Awards ==
Szep won the 2014 Pulitzer Prize for International Reporting with Andrew R.C. Marshall for Reuters reporting on the persecution of the Rohingya minority in Myanmar.

He was also a member of the Reuters team awarded the 2026 Pulitzer Prize for National Reporting for the series Revenge of Donald Trump.

Other honors for his reporting include a George Polk Award, a White House Correspondents' Association Edgar A. Poe Award, the Daniel Pearl Award for Investigative Reporting, an Osborn Elliott Prize, two Sigma Delta Chi Awards from the Society of Professional Journalists, and three Awards for Editorial Excellence from the Society of Publishers in Asia.
