= Christo Buschek =

Austrian software developer and journalist

- Born: 1980 (age 45–46); Graz, Austria
- Occupations: Software developer, investigative journalist
- Employer: BuzzFeed
- Notable work: Investigation on Uyghur camps in China
- Awards: Pulitzer Prize for International Reporting (2021)

Christo Buschek (born 1980 in Graz) is an Austrian information technologist, investigative journalist, BuzzFeed employee, and recipient of the 2021 Pulitzer Prize in the category of International Reporting.

== Biography ==
Christo Buschek attended the Academic Gymnasium Graz starting in 1990, where he graduated with his Matura in 1998.

He has worked in the IT sector for nearly 20 years as a software developer, programmer, and expert in information security. His specialty is working on data-driven investigations for human rights organizations and investigative journalists.

Starting in 2018, he collaborated with Megha Rajagopalan and Alison Killing on a project investigating the largely untraceable Uyghur internment camps operated by the Chinese authorities. Buschek's programming tools enabled the collection and processing of data for the investigation.

Combining satellite imagery with interviews with former detainees, the team identified around 260 camp locations and re-education camps in Xinjiang in the Xinjiang Uyghur Autonomous Region, many more than officially known. These locations were categorized into three groups: those with high certainty, those believed to be camps but not proven, and those with a certain probability. The data was verifiable in all cases. The research results were published on August 27, 2020, on BuzzFeed News.

In collaboration with Hadi Al Khatib and Giovanni Civardi, Buschek is also involved in a project to securely make data on human rights violations accessible. He is a member of the team at Paper trail media, an investigative journalism firm founded in 2022 by Frederik Obermaier and Bastian Obermayer, which collaborates closely with Der Spiegel, ZDF, Der Standard, and the Tamedia Group. He is also a Knowing Machines Fellow at the Engelberg Center on Innovation Law & Policy at the New York University School of Law.

== Pulitzer Prize ==
Christo Buschek was awarded the Pulitzer Prize for International Reporting on June 11, 2021, along with Megha Rajagopalan and Alison Killing, for their four-part investigative report Built to Last on BuzzFeed News, which uncovered the previously unknown Uyghur camps in China. He is the first Austrian to receive the Pulitzer Prize, which has been awarded since 1917 and the first Pulitzer Prize won by a BuzzFeed News team.
