= Henry Kamm =

American journalist (1925–2023)

- Born: Hans Kamm; June 3, 1925; Breslau, Silesia
- Died: July 9, 2023 (aged 98); Paris, France
- Education: New York University
- Occupation: Journalist

Henry Kamm (born Hans Kamm; June 3, 1925 – July 9, 2023) was a German-born American foreign correspondent for The New York Times. He reported for the Times from Southeast Asia (based in Bangkok), Europe, the Middle East, and Africa.

== Early life and education ==
Hans Kamm was born in the German town of Breslau, Silesia (now Wrocław, Poland), on June 3, 1925 to a Jewish family. Kamm attended a progressive collective school that closed in 1933. Then he had to go to a Jewish school. After the Kristallnacht pogroms, Kamm's father was arrested in November 1938 and deported to the Buchenwald concentration camp. After he was temporarily allowed to return home a few months later, he fled to Britain and later went to the United States. In January 1941, Hans Kamm and his mother also fled to the U.S., reached from Lisbon via a sealed train from Breslau.

Kamm grew up in Manhattan, where he graduated from George Washington High School. He became an American citizen in 1943, changing his name to Henry Kamm. At the age of 18 he enlisted in the army in 1944 and fought in Belgium and France, where he learned French. After the end of the war he was employed in Dachau as an interpreter at trials against suspected Nazi war criminals. However, the work of defending the accused was difficult for him; after a week he ended his participation and left Germany.

In 1946, Kamm returned to New York and three years later earned a bachelor's degree from New York University. He was inducted into the honor society Phi Beta Kappa.

== Career in journalism ==
Kamm started working as a journalist for the New York Times in 1949. He reported from France (1960, 1971–1977), Poland (1966–1967), the Soviet Union (1967–1971), Laos (1969), Japan (1977), Thailand, and Afghanistan, among others.

Reporting from Vientiane, Laos, Kamm wrote a major series about the United States' secret war in Laos, beginning with a front-page article published October 26, 1969 that was headlined "Secret Laotian Army".

Kamm was awarded the 1969 George Polk Award for Foreign Reporting.

Kamm won the Pulitzer Prize for International Reporting in 1978 for his coverage of the plight of refugees from Indochina. His early experience of disenfranchisement and forced emigration greatly impacted his 47-year career at the Times, his son Thomas Kamm, a former Wall Street Journal correspondent, said in 2017: it "explains the interest he always showed throughout his journalistic career for refugees, dissidents, those without a voice and the downtrodden."

In the 1960s he came to Germany more often, for example to interview Willy Brandt. He reported from Eastern Europe on the resistance against the communist regimes and made friends with Václav Havel, Jiří Dienstbier, and Stefan Heym.

== Private life ==
In 1950, Kamm married Barbara Lifton. The couple had three children: Alison, Thomas and Nicholas as well as ten grandchildren. Kamm separated from his wife in the late 1970s and lived with a Vietnamese woman who adopted a son. In his retirement, Henry Kamm lived mostly in France. On November 18, 2018, he regained his German citizenship, and in 2021 voted in a German federal election for the first time. Kamm died at St. Joseph's Hospital in Paris, on July 9, 2023, at the age of 98.

== Bibliography ==
- Dragon Ascending: Vietnam and the Vietnamese. Arcade Publishing, 1996. ISBN 1-55970-306-7 ISBN 978-1559703062
- Cambodia: Report from a Stricken Land. Arcade Publishing, 1998. ISBN 1-55970-433-0 ISBN 978-1559704335
