= William Tuohy =

Journalist for Los Angeles Times

William Tuohy

William "Bill" Tuohy (October 1, 1926 – December 31, 2009) was a journalist and author who, for most of his career, was a foreign correspondent for the Los Angeles Times.

== Early life ==
Tuohy was born on October 1, 1926, in Chicago, Illinois, and was brought up in that city. In 1945 he joined the U.S. Navy, and served for two years aboard a submarine rescue vessel, USS Florikan, in the Pacific.

In 1947, and after leaving the navy, Tuohy was injured in a train wreck, and as a result with a pronounced limp for the rest of his life. He returned to Illinois and studied English at the Weinberg College of Arts and Sciences, graduating from Northwestern University in 1951. The following year he went to work at the San Francisco Chronicle as a copy boy.

== Career ==
At the San Francisco Chronicle, Tuohy gained promotion to reporter and, eventually, editor on the city desk. He joined Newsweek magazine in 1959, covering the 1964 presidential campaign and briefly working as the assistant national editor. Tuohy was appointed Newsweek's foreign correspondent in Saigon in 1965, just as the United States was entering the Vietnam War. He was there when the United States began bombing North Vietnam, and when the first US combat troops came ashore at Da Nang.

In 1966 Tuohy joined the Los Angeles Times as the Saigon Bureau Chief. In 1969 Tuohy won the Pulitzer Prize for International Reporting for his Vietnam War correspondence the previous year. Tuohy had a lengthy career as a foreign correspondent. He served as Beirut Bureau Chief from 1968 to 1973, Rome Bureau Chief from 1973 to 1977, London Bureau Chief from 1977 to 1985, Bonn Bureau Chief from 1985 to 1990 and European Security Correspondent from 1990 to 1995. In addition to postings as bureau chief, he covered the Fall of Saigon, the Fall of the Berlin Wall, The Troubles of Northern Ireland, and the first Gulf War.

In 1979, when fellow Los Angeles Times correspondent Joe Alex Morris Jr. was killed in the early days of the Iranian Revolution, Tuohy hired a Learjet and flew into Tehran airport, even though the airport was closed to traffic and occupied by the Revolutionary Guards. After negotiations, he received Morris's body and flew back to the US, returning the body to Morris's family.

In 1989, he published a memoir, Dangerous Company, Inside the World's Hottest Trouble Spots with a Pulitzer Prize-Winning Correspondent.

== Retirement ==
Tuohy retired in 1995.

After retiring, Tuohy wrote two books of naval history. The Bravest Man: The Story of Richard O'Kane and U.S. Submariners in the Pacific War was published in 2001 in the U.K. and 2006 in the U.S. Richard O'Kane was the Executive Officer of USS Wahoo during World War II and later received a Medal of Honor for his service in command of USS Tang. His second book, America's Fighting Admirals: Winning the War at Sea in World War II was published in 2007. The book told the story of the war from the perspective of Navy Admirals such as Marc Mitscher, the commander of the Fast Carrier Task Force and John S. McCain, Sr.

Tuohy died December 31, 2009, following open-heart surgery in Santa Monica, California.

== Family ==
Tuohy married three times. His first marriage was to Mary Ellen Dufek in 1955, and lasted until 1957 before they were divorced. In 1964 he married Johanna Iselin and had a son, Cyril. He and Johanna were divorced in 1989. He married a third time in 1998, to Rose Marie Wheeler, a French citizen born in Vietnam.

== Awards ==
In addition to the Pulitzer Prize for International Reporting, Tuohy won the Overseas Press Club award for his reporting from the Middle East in 1970. He also won the Best Feature Story award in 2003 from Submarine Review.

His last award was, chronologically, being the last notable person to die in 2009.
