= Katherine Ellison =

American author (born 1957)

- Born: August 19, 1957 (age 69); Minnesota, United States
- Occupations: Author of books on ADHD and motherhood
- Spouse: Jack Epstein
- Children: Joey Epstein; Joshua Epstein

Katherine Ellison (born August 19, 1957) is an American author. With two colleagues, she won the 1985 Pulitzer Prize for International Reporting for their work reporting on corruption in the Philippines.

== Career ==
Ellison has authored and co-authored seven books, including: "Loving Learning: How Progressive Education Can Save America's Schools," Square Peg: My Story and What it Means for Raising Innovators, Visionaries, and Out-of-the-Box Thinkers, published by Hyperion Voice in March 2013; Buzz: A Year of Paying Attention, Hyperion Voice, 2010, The Mommy Brain: How motherhood makes us smarter (2005), The New Economy of Nature: The quest to make conservation profitable, Imelda: Steel butterfly of the Philippines.

To promote her 2005 book The Mommy Brain: How motherhood makes us smarter, Ellison appeared on The CBS Early Show, The Today Show, and an excerpt from the book was featured in the May edition of Self Magazine. Time featured an interview with Ellison about The Mommy Brain in the April 25, 2005 edition. The New York Times published an op-ed by Ellison entitled "Mommy Brain" on May 8, 2005.

Ellison's writings have been published in publications such as Working Mother, ConservationMagazine.org, Fortune, Monthly Magazine, and Conservation in Practice.

Her consulting work includes speechwriting for Google.org and Kleiner Perkins Caufield & Byers; editing and writing for David and Lucile Packard Foundation, the Ford Foundation, the Native Conservancy and Stanford University. She writes a monthly column for Frontiers in Ecology and the Environment and is a member of the North 24th Writers. She also wrote an essay in the book Read, Reason, Write 8th edition.

== Awards ==
Working for the San Jose Mercury News in 1985, Ellison along with Lewis M. Simons and Pete Carey wrote about how Ferdinand and Imelda Marcos had looted the Philippines treasury and clandestinely purchased properties in the United States. They were jointly awarded the Pulitzer Prize for International Reporting, citing "their June 1985 series that documented massive transfers of wealth abroad by President Marcos and his associates and had a direct impact on subsequent political developments in the Philippines and the United States."

She has won other journalism prizes including the National Association of Hispanic Journalists first-place award, in 1997, for coverage of problems with privatizations in Mexico and Argentina; the Inter American Press Association first-place award for feature-writing, won in both 1994 and 1995, for stories on politics and culture in South America; the Latin American Studies Association Media Award, in 1994, for several years of excellence in regional coverage; the Overseas Press Club Award, in 1989, for human rights reporting in Mexico and Nicaragua; the George Polk Award and the Investigative Reporters and Editors Award, in 1986, for coverage of the Philippines.

== Personal life ==
Ellison lives in San Anselmo, California and is married to Jack Epstein, foreign editor at the San Francisco Chronicle. They have two sons, Joey and Joshua Epstein.

In 2007, then-48-year-old Ellison and her then-12-year-old son "Buzz," were diagnosed with Attention deficit hyperactivity disorder and had a tumultuous relationship which Ellison describes in her memoir "Buzz: A Year of Paying Attention" (2010).
