= Maggie Michael (journalist) =

American journalist

Maggie Michael is an American journalist. She won the 2019 Pulitzer Prize for International Reporting as part of an Associated Press (AP) team that covered the effects of the Yemen Civil War. She shared the award with Maad al-Zikry and Nariman El-Mofty. Michael, born 1979, began working for the AP in 2002 and worked to cover conflicts in the Middle East.
