= Lewis M. Simons =

American journalist

- Born: January 9, 1939 (age 87); Paterson, New Jersey, U.S.
- Occupation: Journalist
- Spouse: Carol Lenore Seiderman

Lewis M. Simons (born January 9, 1939) is an American Pulitzer Prize-winning correspondent on foreign affairs throughout Asia and the Middle East.

== Early life ==
A native of Paterson, Simons was raised in New Jersey. For his post-secondary education, he attended Rutgers University and graduated from New York University. Afterward, he attended Columbia University Graduate School of Journalism, where he met his future wife Carol Lenore Seiderman. The couple married in 1965.

== Career ==
Simons began his journalistic career in 1964 as a reporter for The Associated Press. Specialized in Asian affairs, he has reported extensively on war, civil unrest, politics, and economics, working in China, Tibet, India, Pakistan, Afghanistan, Nepal, Sri Lanka, Japan, North Korea, South Korea, Malaysia, Singapore, Vietnam, Cambodia, Laos, Thailand, Philippines, Burma, Indonesia, Iran, Iraq, Russia, Kazakhstan, and Panama. In 1971, he joined The Washington Post and served as a correspondent in India and Thailand for the next five years. From1982 to 1996, Simone worked as a correspondent for The San Jose Mercury News/Knight-Ridder Newspapers, based in Tokyo. One of his projects during this period was "Hidden Billions," a series of investigative articles with reporters Pete Carey and Catherine Ellison on the massive transfers of wealth abroad by Philippines President Ferdinand E. Marcos, his wife, Imelda Marcos, and their associates. Being on Tokyo assignment in 1985, Simons was investigating the circumstances surrounding the assassination of the prominent Filipino politician Benigno Aquino, when he came across information on Marcos's financial affairs. In 1986, the three journalists were awarded the Pulitzer Prize for International Reporting. Their exposing of Marcos's stunning corruption led to the People Power Revolution and the toppling of the regime. A year later, Simons published a book on the Philippine revolution, "Worth Dying For". His other books are "The Next Front," co-authored with U.S. Sen. Christopher "Kit" Bond, and "To Tell The Truth."

Simons’s op-ed and analytical articles have appeared in The New York Times, The Washington Post, Foreign Affairs, The Atlantic, and Smithsonian magazine. In 1995, he and his Mercury News colleage Michael Zielenziger were shortlisted for the Pulitzer Prize for a series on the growing economic and political influence of Overseas Chinese on China and throughout Asia. Simons and Ron Shafer, his colleague at The Washington Post, were Pulitzer finalists in 1978 for thieir investigation of Pride Inc., a Black self-help organization run by the wife of Washington, DC Mayor Marion Barry. As a direct result of this series of articles, five Pride leaders were tried, found guilty of a range of crimes, and imprisoned.

In 2012–2013, Simons held the endowed Snedden Chair at the University of Alaska Fairbanks and was the Edward R. Murrow Fellow at the Council on Foreign Relations in 1970-1971. He and his wife have three adult children and reside in Washington, DC.

== Awards ==
- Edward R. Murrow Fellow, Council on Foreign Relations (1970);
- Distinguished Investigative Reporting Award, Investigative Reporters and Editors (1979);
- Front Page Award (1979);
- Citation for Excellence, Newspaper Guilt (1984);
- Citation for Excellence, Overseas Press Club (1983);
- Award for Excellence, World Affairs Council (1984, 1986, 1989, 1992);
- George Polk Award (1985);
- Grand Prize, Investigative Reporters and Editors (1986);
- Jessie Meriton White Award (1986);
- Overseas Press Club award (1987, 1992);
- Gerald Loeb Award, Anderson Graduate School of Management (1993).

== Books ==
- Brennan E. A. (1999). Who's who of Pulitzer Prize Winners. Westport: Greenwood Publishing Group. p. 666. ISBN 9781573561112.
- Fischer H. D. (1987). The Pulitzer Prize Archive: International reporting, 1928-1985. Vienna: Walter de Gruyter. p. 357. ISBN 9783598301704.
- Rodell P. A. (2002). Culture and Customs of the Philippines. Greenwood Publishing Group. p. 257. ISBN 9780313304156.
