= Price Day =

American war correspondent (1907-1978)

- Born: November 4, 1907; Plainview, Texas
- Died: January 29, 1978
- Occupation: journalist

Price Day (1907–29 January, 1978) was a war correspondent for The Baltimore Sun who won a 1949 Pulitzer Prize for International Reporting.

== Early life ==
Price Day was born in 1907 in Plainview, Texas. At the age of ten, he moved with his family to Chicago. After admission to Princeton University, Day headed the school's magazine The Tiger. Upon graduation in 1929, he worked as a cartoonist and a freelance author of Saturday Evening Post, Colliers, for over a decade.

== Career ==
In 1942, Price Day moved to Florida to join the Fort Lauderdale Times as a city editor. But a year later, he was assigned by the Baltimore Sun to cover the Mediterranean battle areas as a war correspondent. He performed his job from 1942 to 1945 and covered the 8th Air Force, the Anzio beachhead, and Rome's liberation, the breaking of the "Gustav Line" near the Vosges. In 1945, Day was present at the signing of the German Instrument of Surrender.

In the post-war period, the correspondent covered the Potsdam Conference, the Nuremberg Trials, the restoration of the usual way of life in Czechoslovakia, France, Germany, and the Caribbean. Overall, Day reported on 16 national political conventions as a reporter and later as an editor. His experience culminated in his assignment to the leading role in Sun's authors' team on a worldwide study of the British Commonwealth and Empire and its changes since the cessation of hostilities.

Secretary of War Robert P. Patterson honored war correspondents, including Day, at an event in Washington, on November 23, 1946.

In 1948, Price Day got an assignment to India, where he wrote a twelve-article series "Experiment with Freedom – India and Its First Year of Independence." In the course of his work in the country, the journalist also interviewed Mahatma Gandhi. His journalistic success earned him the Pulitzer Prize for International Reporting in 1949.

In 1952, Day moved from reporting to the editorial staff of the Baltimore Sun in 1952. Four years later, he became an associate editor of the newspaper. In the 1970s, the columnist joined the Advisory Board on the Pulitzer Prizes.

In 1975, Day retired from editor‐in‐chief of the Sun and the newspapers after 15 years. He died at the age of 71 in MedStar Memorial Hospital three years later.
