= Clare Baldwin =

American journalist

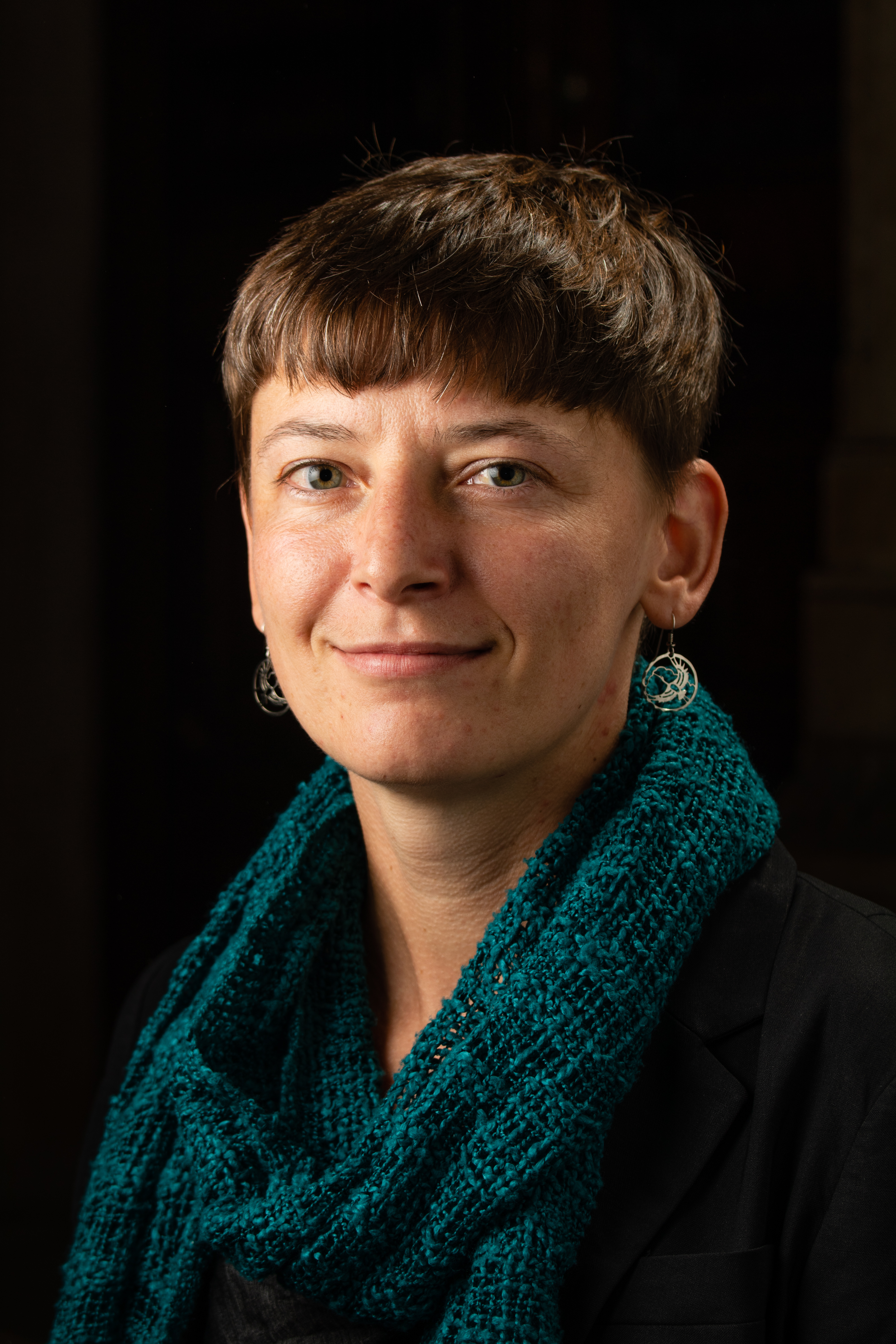
Clare Baldwin

Clare Baldwin is an American journalist. As a special correspondent for Reuters in the Philippines, she won a Pulitzer Prize for International Reporting in 2018 for investigating Philippines President Rodrigo Duterte’s war on drugs since 2016.

== Early life and education ==
Clare Baldwin grew up in Alaska's Matanuska-Susitna Valley. Both her parents were teachers. During high school, she did an internship at the local newspaper, the Mat-Su Valley Frontiersman. After graduating from Colony High School, she attended Stanford University, where she majored in English and minored in human biology. Baldwin graduated from Stanford in 2005.

== Career ==
Before joining Reuters in 2009, Baldwin wrote articles for Wired magazine and various regional newspapers. She then worked for Reuters’ San Francisco and New York offices, covering law, business and technology.

In 2018, Baldwin was part of the three-person team that won the Pulitzer for a series of articles that exposed a campaign of deadly violence by Philippine president Rodrigo Duterte. The Philippine Drug War is the severe anti-drug movement politicized by Duterte, who assumed office on June 30, 2016. Baldwin helped to expose Duterte’s demands for police and the public to kill criminals and drug addicts. Since Duterte assumed office, more than 7,000 people have been killed in what the Philippine National Police (PNP) deemed “lawful anti-drug operations.” Baldwin and her colleagues’ reporting also revealed the bias of the PNP in its tendency to murder “poor people” and suspected drug users, not drug dealers. Baldwin’s coverage of the phenomenon was strengthened by Reuter’s obtainment of video footage and PNP public records. Baldwin spent months visiting police stations throughout Manila in order to obtain these records. After securing data on two major Phillipian cities, Baldwin analyzed the data to reveal systematic patterns of Duterte’s war on drugs, ultimately leading to the investigation that won her a Pulitzer. Additionally, Baldwin’s coverage was particularly significant because of the historical role of journalists in the Philippines. The Philippines is currently the second most dangerous country in the world for reporters, and in the past two decades, 65 journalists have been murdered there and convictions have been obtained in just five cases.

In 2019, she was part of the Reuters staff awarded the Pulitzer for a series of articles exposing the military units responsible for the expulsion and murder of Rohinga Muslims from Myanmar.

In 2021, Baldwin reported on a gene sequencing company using prenatal tests sold globally to collect genetic data from millions of women. Baldwin and her co-author, Kirsty Needham, reported that BGI Group, the Chinese gene sequencing company collaborated with China’s military when developing the prenatal tests. The Reuters review found that since 2010, BGI Group published numerous joint studies on the prenatal tests with the People’s Liberation Army, researching and improving the tests or analysing the test data.

== Honors and awards ==
- 2018, Pulitzer Prize for International Reporting, with Andrew R.C. Marshall and Manuel Mogato, for exposing the killing campaign behind Philippines President Rodrigo Duterte's war on drugs.
- 2018, Hal Boyle award from Overseas Press Club of America, for work exposing Philippine president Rodrigo Duterte's "campaign of deadly violence."
- 2019, Pulitzer Prize for International Reporting, awarded to staff of Reuters with significant contributions by Wa Lone and Kyaw Soe Oo, for exposing the military units and Buddhist villagers responsible for the systematic expulsion and murder of Rohingya Muslims from Myanmar, which the awards committee described as “courageous coverage that landed its reporters in prison.”
