= Daniel De Luce =

American journalist (1911-2002)

- Born: June 8, 1911; Yuma, Arizona
- Died: January 29, 2002 (aged 90)
- Occupation: journalist

Daniel De Luce (June 8, 1911 – January 29, 2002) was an American journalist for the Associated Press from 1929 to 1976. He won a Pulitzer Prize in 1944.

== Early life ==
Daniel De Luce was born on June 8, 1911, in Yuma, Arizona. Growing up in Los Angeles, upon graduation from High School in Los Angeles, he attended the UCLA where he was elected to Phi Beta Kappa.

== Career ==
De Luce started his journalistic career in the Los Angeles bureau of the Associated Press as an office boy, where he worked in 1929–1934. Afterward, he spent a year as a member of Los Angeles Examiner staff. He then got the position of a reporter in the Associated Press. In spring 1939, Luce got his first international assignment and moved to Budapest, where he began reporting on the conflicts that led to World War II.

De Luce left his position in Budapest to cover the onset of the war in Poland. During the war, he covered the Italian assault against Albania and the Greek assault against the Italians, British retreat from Burma, American campaigns in North Africa and Italy. He also reported from Tunisia, Sicily, Turkey, and crossed the neck of Cap Bon to report on the German battle lines of North Africa. In 1944, Daniel De Luce earned the Pulitzer Prize for Telegraphic reporter (International) for his correspondence on the partisan resistance led by Marshal Josip Broz Tito in Yugoslavia.

Daniel De Luce correspondent reported on the trials at Nuremberg following World War II. After covering the Arab-Israeli war in 1947—1948, he moved to Europe to take charge of the Associated Press bureau in Frankfurt. In 1956, he returned to the United States to serve at the agency's head office in New York for the next twenty years. After retiring in 1976, Daniel De Luce moved with his family to Escondido, California, where he died at 90 at Palomar Medical Center.
