= Yael Grauer =

American investigative journalist

Yael Grauer is an American investigative journalist who covers privacy, digital security, and surveillance. As a contributor to an Associated Press team, she shared the 2026 Pulitzer Prize for International Reporting for a global investigation of mass surveillance technology and its spread from Silicon Valley and China to the U.S. Border Patrol. Her co-winners were the AP journalists Dake Kang, Garance Burke, Byron Tau, and Aniruddha Ghosal.

Grauer spent a decade as a freelance reporter for outlets including Wired, The Intercept, Ars Technica, and Slate, writing about data brokers, security flaws, and police surveillance. With Micah Lee, she broke the news that Zoom was misleading users about its end-to-end encryption. She later ran cybersecurity research at Consumer Reports, where she managed its Security Planner guide.

Grauer also maintains the Big Ass Data Broker Opt-Out List, a do-it-yourself guide to removing personal information from data broker sites.
