= Manuel Mogato =

Filipino journalist

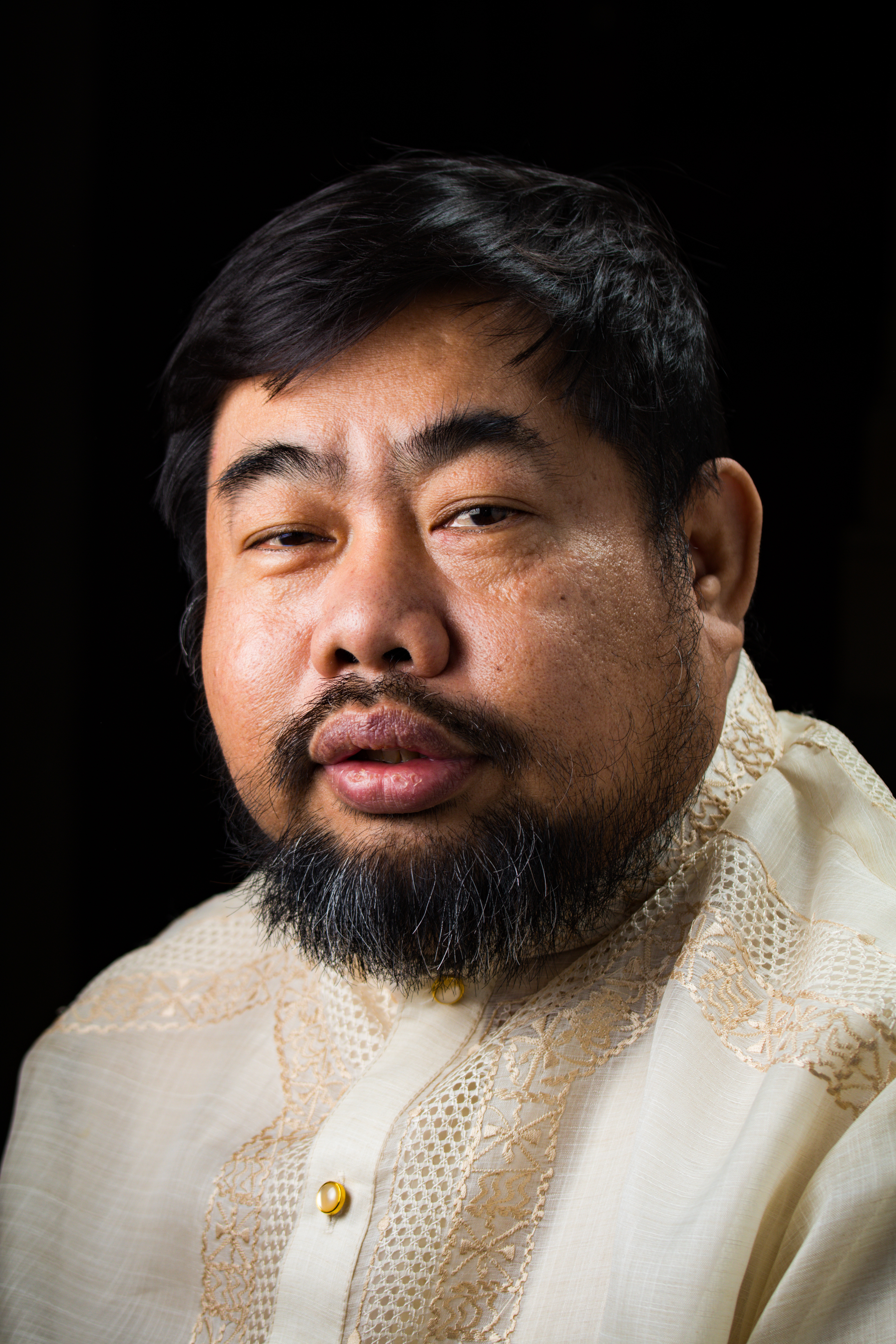
- Manuel Mogato at the 2018 Pulitzer Prizes awards ceremony
- Occupation: Journalist

Manuel Mogato is a Filipino Pulitzer Prize-winning journalist and the editor-at-large of independent news website PressONE.ph. Concurrently, he serves as the defense editor of One News, a television news channel under Cignal TV.

== Career ==
Graduating from the Pamantasan ng Lungsod ng Maynila in 1983, Mogato began his journalistic career as a crime, military, and political reporter for local newspapers. He was the graveyard shift police reporter for People's Journal Tonight and later for the revived Manila Times under Chino Roces until April 1986. He then covered the defense and military beats for the defunct Manila Chronicle during the turbulent years of Corazon "Cory" Aquino government. Meanwhile, he also served as assistant news editor for the Manila Times under the ownership of the Gokongweis for ten years up to 1999, until the newspaper temporarily ceased its operations due to political pressure from the government of Joseph Estrada. He had also worked for the Japanese newspaper Asahi Shimbun for a total of seven years covering politics, security, and diplomacy before he moved to Reuters in 2003.

He reported on the downfall of dictator Ferdinand Marcos Sr. and the People Power Revolution in 1986, the successful bid for the presidency of Fidel V. Ramos in 1992, numerous failed coups from the late 1980s until early 2000s, and the ouster of Joseph Estrada in 2001, among other important news. Also he wrote about disasters and humanitarian crises including the Luzon earthquake in 1990 and the eruption of Mount Pinatubo in 1991.

Reporting for Reuters as a political and general news Manila-based correspondent since 2003, Mogato has traveled across Southeast Asia covering APEC and ASEAN Summits, the occupation of Marawi by pro-Islamic militants, typhoon Haiyan, regional pandemics, and other topics. In addition to being a journalist, he started teaching basic newswriting and editorial writing at Pamantasan ng Lungsod ng Maynila as a part-time lecturer in 2011.

In 2019, Mogato left Reuters to become the defense and diplomacy editor at cable TV news channel, Cignal TV's One News. He also hosted the radio program, 'Wag Po!, until March 2023, with a television simulcast on One PH.

== Awards ==
Mogarto's journalistic work has been recognized with a number of international awards. Accolades he has received include the Human Rights Press Award; a Marshall McLuhan fellowship; and two awards from the London-based Amnesty International Media Awards. His work was also noted by the Overseas Press Club in 1979, the Society of Publishers in Asia in 2013, the Union of Catholic Asian News, and the Rotary Club of Manila.

Mogato, alongside two other Reuters journalists Clare Baldwin and Andrew Marshall, won a Pulitzer Prize for International Reporting in 2018. They were recognized for "[exposing] the brutal killing campaign behind Philippines President Rodrigo Duterte’s war on drugs." Mogato is the second Manila-based Filipino journalist and the seventh Filipino to win a Pulitzer. Former president Fidel V. Ramos congratulated Mogato with a formal letter.
