= Michael Parks (reporter) =

American journalist, editor, and educator (1943–2022)

- Born: November 17, 1943; Detroit
- Died: January 8, 2022 (aged 78); Pasadena
- Education: University of Windsor

Michael Parks (November 17, 1943 – January 8, 2022) was an American journalist, editor, and educator who wrote on various political events around the world throughout his career. He served as editor of the Los Angeles Times from 1997 to 2000. He won a Pulitzer Prize for International Reporting award in 1987 for his reports about the struggle against apartheid in South Africa. He also taught at USC Annenberg School for Communication and Journalism and served several stints as its director.

== Early life and education ==
Parks was born in Detroit on November 17, 1943. He studied classical languages and English literature at the University of Windsor in Canada, graduating with a Bachelor of Arts in 1965.

== Career ==
=== Journalism ===
Parks began his career in journalism with The Detroit News, working in the capacity of general assignment reporter from 1962 to 1965. Following this, he joined the Time-Life News Service as a correspondent in 1965. Thereafter he was part of the original team that started The Suffolk Sun, then becoming its Assistant Copy Editor. In 1968, he took on a position at The Baltimore Sun.

Parks joined the Los Angeles Times' team in 1980. A decade-and-a-half later, he became deputy foreign editor and thereafter managing editor. From 1997 to 2000, he served as editor-in-chief, the ninth in the paper's history. During his time in this role, the newspaper received a further four Pulitzer Prizes. In addition, he managed over 1,350 people, and took charge of a $120m+ budget. Further, with Parks in this position circulation of the Los Angeles Times grew to 1,170,000 (up 16 percent). Its website was also revamped under his leadership.

=== Educational positions ===
Parks joined the faculty of USC Annenberg School for Communication and Journalism in 2000. He became interim director at its School of Journalism the following year. By 2002, he served as School Director, a position he held until 2008. He later returned as interim director between 2013 and 2014. Parks guided the development of USC Annenberg's core curriculum to focus on how to write journalistic articles. He supported the school's global reporting programs and initiatives on covering disparate communities.

Furthermore, Parks showed educational interest in his work at The Los Angeles Times, playing a keynote role in the launch of “Reading by 9” – an initiative to facilitate in all Southern Californian children reading at grade level by the end of Grade 3. This was in conjunction with an editorial advocacy for the endorsement of a new city charter and educational reform for LA, electing a new school board.

=== Committees ===
Parks was a member of the Western Selection Committee for the German Marshall Fund Fellowships and the South African Selection Committee for the Fulbright Fellowship. He was also a member of: the American Society of News Editors, Council on Foreign Relations, Pacific Council on International Policy, International Press Institute, Asia Society, and the Society of Professional Journalists.

== Personal life ==
Parks was married to Linda Parks until his death. Together, they had three children: Christopher, Matthew, and Danielle, who predeceased him in 2007. They resided in Pasadena, California.

Parks died on January 8, 2022, at Huntington Hospital in Pasadena. He was 78 years old, and suffered from kidney failure and a heart attack prior to his death.

== Awards and honors ==
Parks was a juror for the American Society of News Editors (ASNE) Writing Awards, the Gerald Loeb Award, the Pulitzer Prize and the Selden Ring Award. He was the recipient of the 1987 Pulitzer Prize for International Reporting for his “balanced and comprehensive” coverage of South Africa’s struggle against apartheid. According to Ernest J. Wilson III, Dean of USC Annenberg, “Michael Parks is a real star. His extraordinary wisdom and experience will be invaluable to our students, faculty and staff.”
