= Shirley Christian =

American journalist

Shirley Christian is a Pulitzer Prize-winning journalist and author, known for reporting on the Central American crisis during the 1970s and 1980s. Christian has worked as a foreign correspondent for the New York Times, Miami Herald, and Associated Press. Her book on the Nicaraguan Revolution, according to the Wall Street Journal, “may stand as the definitive account of the fall of Anastasio Somoza and the rise of the Sandinistas.”

She is also the author of the 2004 history Before Lewis and Clark: The Story of the Chouteaus, the French Dynasty That Ruled America's Frontier.

== Early life and career ==
Christian graduated from Pittsburg State University in 1960 with a B.A. in language and literature, and from Ohio State University in 1966 with a M.A. in international journalism. She was later selected as a Neiman Fellow at Harvard University.

In 1968, she joined the Associated Press and faced discrimination because of her gender. She writes: “When I arrived in New York at the end of 1968… the foreign editor declared that a woman would go abroad over his dead or retired body. During the coming five years I sat by as my male contemporaries, after a year or two on one of the desks, were dispatched into the wide world.” In 1973, she joined a class action discrimination complaint against the AP. At the time, the news staff was 7% women.

She went on to work as the AP’s United Nations correspondent and as an editor at its Foreign and World Desk before deciding to concentrate her reporting on Latin America. She then became the AP bureau chief for Chile and Bolivia.

== 1981 Pulitzer Prize ==
In 1980, Christian joined the Latin America Bureau for the Miami Herald and began reporting on the Central American crisis, the political turmoil that was sweeping across Nicaragua, Guatemala, El Salvador, and Honduras. She was known for reporting on the human aspect of the conflict.

She won the 1981 Pulitzer Prize for International Reporting “for her dispatches from Central America.” The jury stated, “She displays a superb eye for detail, and combines great writing skill with her obvious expertise on the complex and bewildering problems that bedevil the region.”

She lived in Latin America for 20 years, rising to become the New York Times Bureau Chief for Argentina.

== Books ==
Nicaragua: Revolution in the Family In 1985, she published Nicaragua: Revolution in the Family, an account of the overthrow of Nicaragua’s dictatorship by the left-wing Sandinistas and the rise of the Contra rebel groups who opposed the new leadership.

The book received mixed reviews. The Foreign Affairs review stated, “This is the best analysis we yet possess of the fall of the Somoza regime and the rise of the Sandinistas.” Kirkus Reviews wrote, "Christian's fundamental hostility to the Sandinistas mars her story" and "it fails as a constructive, enlightening study of the problems of Nicaragua." The New York Times reviewer wrote: “After so much ideological fever, so many boring meetings and flat ephemeral pamphlets, it is marvelous to find a book that spends most of its considerable length just telling us what actually happened.”

Before Lewis and Clark: The Story of the Chouteaus, the French Dynasty That Ruled America's Frontier

Christian’s 2004 book, Before Lewis and Clark, tells the story of the American West before the famous expedition that begins many of the region’s histories. She focuses particularly on the Chouteau family—“the dynasty that guarded the gates to the West for three generations.” Before Lewis and Clark puts particular emphasis on the people often neglected in such histories: the Chouteau women, and the native people who the family was interacting with on the frontier.

Publishers Weekly wrote: “Christian's lively portrait of the Chouteaus opens a window on a little-known portion of early American history.”
