= Joan D. Hedrick =

American historian (born 1944)

- Born: Joan Doran; Baltimore, Maryland, U.S.
- Occupations: Charles A. Dana Professor of History, Emerita
- Spouse: Travis Hedrick
- Awards: Pulitzer Prize for Biography or Autobiography

Academic background
- Education: Brown University
- Thesis: The True American : Henry Adams, Theodore Roosevelt, "Prufrock", and Others (1974)

Joan Doran Hedrick (born May 1, 1944) is a Pulitzer Prize-winning historian and biographer of Harriet Beecher Stowe and Jack London.

== Early life and career ==
Hedrick was born in Baltimore, Maryland, to Paul Thomas Doran and Jane Connorton Doran.

She earned an A.B. degree from Vassar College in 1966, and a Ph.D. from Brown University in 1974. Her Ph.D. dissertation at Brown was titled "The True American: Henry Adams, Theodore Roosevelt, 'Prufrock', and Others". She taught at Wesleyan University in Middletown, Connecticut, from 1972 through 1980 and in 1980 began teaching at Trinity College in Hartford, Connecticut.

== Works ==
In 1982, Hedrick's first book, Solitary Comrade: Jack London and His Work, was published by the University of North Carolina Press. Her book Harriet Beecher Stowe: A Life was published in 1994 by Oxford University Press and won the 1995 Pulitzer Prize for Biography or Autobiography. The book received favorable reviews from The New York Times and Publishers Weekly.
