= Mark Fritz =

American journalist

Mark Fritz is a war correspondent and author. A native of Detroit and graduate of Wayne State University, he won a Pulitzer Prize for International Reporting in 1995 for his stories concerning the Rwandan genocide.

== Journalism career ==
As a staff writer for the Associated Press (AP), from 1984-1997, and again in 2003, Fritz reported on the reunification of Germany, the collapse of the Soviet Union, and wars in Iraq, Afghanistan, Rwanda, Somalia, Chechnya, and Liberia, among others. As an AP editor on the Foreign Desk, he filed the first U.S. bulletin on the fall of the Berlin Wall on November 9, 1989. He subsequently was named East Berlin correspondent, then West Africa bureau chief. Fritz also served a stint on the agency's computer-assisted investigative reporting team and as roving foreign correspondent for the International Desk in New York. He subsequently worked as a New York-based national writer for the Los Angeles Times and the Boston Globe, and as an investigative reporter for The Wall Street Journal.

Before returning to the AP in 2003, Fritz left the news business to perform humanitarian work in the Darfur region of Sudan for the International Rescue Committee, and conduct war crimes investigations for Human Rights Watch in Uganda.

Fritz's nonfiction book, Lost on Earth, chronicles the stories of people uprooted by the wars that broke out at the end of the Cold War. He is also the author of the novel, Permanent Deadline.

== Works ==
- Lost on Earth: Nomads of the New World. Boston : Little, Brown and Co., 1999, ISBN 0316294780, Trade paperback by Routledge, ISBN 0415926092
- Permanent Deadline. Create Space. 2014 ISBN 9781495318849
- The Mammoth Book Of War Correspondence 2001 New York, Carroll & Graf Publishers, Inc. ISBN 0-7867-0866-2

== Recognition ==
- 1995 - Pulitzer Prize for International Reporting for stories concerning the Rwandan genocide.
- 1995 - American Society of Newspaper Editors inaugural Jesse Laventhol Award for Deadline Writing
- 1999 - Lost on Earth named one of the top five non-fiction books by Salon.com.
