= Goran Tomašević =

Serbian photographer (born 1969)

- Горан Томашевић
- Born: 1969 (age 56–57); Belgrade, SFR Yugoslavia
- Occupation: Photojournalism
- Known for: Pulitzer Prize–winner

Goran Tomašević (Serbian Cyrillic: Горан Томашевић; born 1969), is a Serbian photographer. Working for The Globe and Mail since May 2022, he has spent more than 30 years travelling around the globe to cover the world's biggest stories.

Tomašević's award-winning pictures of wars and revolutions have become some of the most iconic images of the conflicts fought in the Balkans, Iraq, Afghanistan, Libya and Syria. His work includes photographic features from Egypt, Lebanon, Morocco, Sudan, South Sudan, Mozambique, DR Congo, Central African Republic, Burundi, Nigeria, Uganda, Ethiopia, Somalia, Djibouti, Kenya, Honduras, Chile, Mexico, Colombia, Vietnam, Pakistan, United States and sports coverage of the Olympics and soccer World Cups.

== Career ==
Tomašević began photographing the war that followed the breakup of Yugoslavia from 1991 for daily newspaper Politika. In 1996 he joined the world's largest news agency, Reuters, covering the simmering political tensions in Kosovo and the anti-Milošević demonstrations in his hometown of Belgrade since mid-1990s. During three-month NATO bombing of Yugoslavia in 1999, Tomašević was the only photographer working for foreign press to spend the duration of the conflict in Kosovo.

Tomašević moved to Jerusalem in 2002, covering the second Palestinian intifada. During the U.S. led invasions of Iraq in 2003, his picture of a U.S. Marine watching the toppling of a Saddam Hussein statue became one of the most memorable images of the war. He often returned to Iraq as sectarian violence escalated and regularly photographed America's other war in Afghanistan. His sequence of photographs of U.S. Marine Sergeant Bee narrowly escaping Taliban bullets became an iconic image in U.S. war history.

Tomašević moved to Cairo in 2006 and was at the heart of Reuters' coverage of the Arab Springs. In Libya, his image of a fireball that spewed up after an air strike on pro-Gaddafi fighters became an iconic image of the Libyan war, gracing the front pages of more than 100 newspapers around the globe. He stayed in Cairo until 2012. His raw pictures of rebel fighters battling pro-Assad forces among the ruins of Aleppo and Damascus during the Syrian Civil War have won international acclaim, as did his coverage of the bloody siege on a Nairobi shopping mall in Kenya. Tomašević worked for Reuters until 2022.

== Awards ==
Tomašević's work has been recognized with many prestigious international awards. He was named "Reuters Photographer of the Year" a record four times (2003, 2005, 2011 and 2013) and won the "Reuters Photograph of the Year" award in 2008 and in 2017. In 2014, he was awarded first prize in the "Spot News Stories" category and third prize in 2017 for the spot news singe at the World Press Photo contest and second and third prize at "News Picture Story" at "POYi". He won "China International Press Photo of the Year" in 2011 and was awarded for spot news in 2004 and 2012.

In 2009, he won the "SOPA Award of Excellence for News Photography". In 2012, Tomašević won the "London Frontline Club Award" and in 2013 the "Days Japan" award. In 2005, he got the National Press Photography Association, Best of Photo journalism in the Portrait and Personality category and third place for news in 2011. In 2014, he was nominated for the Pulitzer Prize for Breaking News Photography.

The Guardian's photo team chose Goran Tomašević as their agency photographer of the year for 2013. International Business Times UK chose Goran as their agency photographer of the year for 2016.

In April 2019, Tomašević and several of his colleagues from Reuters were awarded with the Pulitzer Prize Breaking News Photography award, for covering the mass migration of Central and South Americans to the United States.

== Exhibitions ==
In 2012, the Czech Photo Gallery in Prague held a six-week exhibition of Tomašević's war photography, depicting more than two decades of conflict. Further exhibitions were held at the Hong Kong's Foreign Correspondents Club in 2014 and Perpignan, France during the Visa pour l’Image festival in 2006, 2013, 2015, 2017, 2019 and 2022.

== Publications ==
In 2022, a collection of Tomašević's work was published in a 444-page book from Edition with the title "Goran Tomašević". It was published in English, French and German. The plaudits for his work included the description "a wonderful Caravaggio of photography".
