= Mark S. Watson =

American Editor and Correspondent for The Baltimore Sun, between 1920s and 1960s

Mark Skinner Watson (June 24, 1887 – March 25, 1966) was an American editor and correspondent for The Baltimore Sun between the 1920s and 1960s. Watson started his journalism career in 1908 before entering The Baltimore Sun in 1920 as an assistant managing editor. After being named a Sunday editor for the Baltimore newspaper in 1941, Watson moved to military correspondence in 1941. While holding this position until the 1960s, Watson covered multiple topics including the nuclear testing at Bikini Atoll, the invention of the nuclear submarine and the Korean War. During his career, Watson received the 1945 Pulitzer Prize for Telegraphic Reporting - International and the Presidential Medal of Freedom in 1963.

== Early life and education ==
On June 24, 1887, Watson was born in Plattsburgh, New York. For his post-secondary education, Watson received a Bachelor of Arts from Union College in 1908.

== Career ==
During his education, Watson began his journalism career as a reporter for the Plattsburgh Press in 1908. After leaving the newspaper in 1909, he worked for the Chicago Tribune as an overseas correspondent until 1917. While with Chicago, he briefly was the director of publicity for the Panama–California Exposition from 1914 to 1915. Upon ending his correspondence position, Watson served in the United States Army from 1917 to 1920 as an intelligence officer. After World War I, Watson was a managing editor for the Ladies' Home Journal in 1920 before joining The Baltimore Sun that year.

With Baltimore, Watson started as an assistant managing editor in 1920 before being named the Sunday edition editor in 1927. In 1939, Watson began writing stories on World War II before becoming a military correspondent for the Baltimore newspaper in 1941. During the war, Watson reported on the war in North Africa and Europe before returning to the United States Army in 1944. After the end of the Second World War, Watson wrote additional military stories for the Baltimore Sun until 1966. Some of the topics that Watson covered during this time period included the nuclear testing at Bikini Atoll, the debut of the first nuclear submarine, and the Korean War.

== Awards and honors ==
During his tenure with the Baltimore Sun, Watson was awarded the 1945 Pulitzer Prize for Telegraphic Reporting - International. He later received the Presidential Medal of Freedom in 1963.

== Personal life ==
Watson died on March 25, 1966, in Baltimore, Maryland. He was married and had two children.
