= Lynn Heinzerling =

American correspondent (1906–1983)

Lynn Louis Heinzerling
- Born: October 23, 1906; Birmingham, Erie County, Ohio, U.S.
- Died: November 23, 1983 (aged 77); Elyria, Ohio, U.S.
- Education: University of Akron
- Occupation: correspondent

Lynn Louis Heinzerling (October 23, 1906 – November 21, 1983) was an American correspondent for the Associated Press, who won the Pulitzer Prize for his coverage of the Congo Crisis in 1961.

== Biography ==
Lynn Heinzerling was born in Birmingham, Ohio, and raised in Elyria. After attending the University of Akron in 1924– 1925, he enrolled at Ohio Wesleyan University. Heinzerling graduated in 1927 and served as Cleveland's Plain-Dealer correspondent for five years from 1928. He covered such stories as the Ohio River flood, the Little steel strike, and the Torso Murders. Later, Heinzerling entered the service of the Associated Press in Cleveland. He was traveling across Europe as an international correspondent from 1938 to 1945. On September 1, 1939, he was in Gdańsk, where he covered the early period of the German occupation. During the next years, he reported from Vienna, Helsinki, Copenhagen, Paris, Madrid, Lisbon, Rome, London, and Geneva, where he served as Associated Press editor-in-chief from 1948.

In 1957, Heinzerling was named the head of the Johannesburg bureau. Four years later, he won the Pulitzer Prize for his coverage of the Congo Crisis and other African developments. In 1963, he settled in Ohio to head the local bureau of the Associated Press. But in the last years of his career, Heinzerling returned to Africa as an international correspondent. After retiring in the United States in 1971, he moved to Elyria, where he died twelve years later. He was inducted posthumously into the Cleveland journalism hall of fame. Lynn was a father to Larry Heinzerling and Lynn Heinzerling Jr. He married Agnes Dengate.

== Books ==
- Fischer (2014). Foreign Correspondents Report From Africa: Pulitzer Prize Winning Articles and Pictures. Vienna: LIT Verlag Münster. p. 189. ISBN 9783643904416.
- Fischer H. (2014). The Pulitzer Prize Archive: International reporting, 1928–1985. Vienna: Walter de Gruyter. p. 357. ISBN 9783598301711.
