= Borzou Daragahi =

Iranian-American journalist

- Born: c. 1969; Tehran, Imperial State of Iran
- Education: Columbia University Graduate School of Journalism; Eugene Lang College The New School for Liberal Arts; Homewood-Flossmoor High School
- Occupation: Journalist
- Employer: The Independent

Borzou Daragahi (Persian: برزو درگاهی; born c. 1969) is an Iranian-American print and radio journalist, who is International Correspondent for The Independent. Previously he was a correspondent for BuzzFeed News and The Financial Times. He served also as Baghdad bureau chief for the Los Angeles Times.

A U.S. citizen of Iranian descent, Daragahi was a 2005 Pulitzer Prize finalist for his coverage of Iraq and led the bureau that was named a 2007 Pulitzer finalist for its Iraq coverage. He was also named a 2010 Pulitzer finalist for his coverage of the 2009 election unrest in Iran. He has covered Iran, Afghanistan, Lebanon and the wider Middle East. Before joining the Los Angeles Times in 2005, he was a freelance journalist for a number of publications and radio outlets, including the Newark, N.J. Star-Ledger. He also contributed to the Marketplace radio program. He covered the build-up to the 2003 U.S. invasion of Iraq for the Associated Press.

After 4½ years in Iraq, Daragahi moved on in 2007 to a new assignment in Beirut. On April 10, 2007, The L.A. Times published a front page memoir of his time in Iraq. The article describes the tactics used by reporters working under potentially lethal conditions, and provides personal insight into the effects of terror and stress on those working in combat zones.

In September 2011, Daragahi became the Cairo-based Middle East and North Africa correspondent for the Financial Times. In April 2015, Daragahi joined BuzzFeed News as a new Middle East reporter. He joined The Independent in September 2018.

He is a 1987 alumnus of Homewood-Flossmoor High School in Flossmoor, Ill.
