= Michael Zielenziger =

American journalist

Michael Zielenziger (born June 28, 1955) is an American journalist and author, and a visiting scholar at the Institute of International Studies, University of California, Berkeley.

== Works ==
- Shutting Out the Sun : How Japan Created Its Own Lost Generation, Nan A. Talese - Random House, published September 2006; paperback - Vintage Departures, published September 2007; Japanese edition - Kodansha, June 2007.
