= Alison Killing =

British architect and urban designer

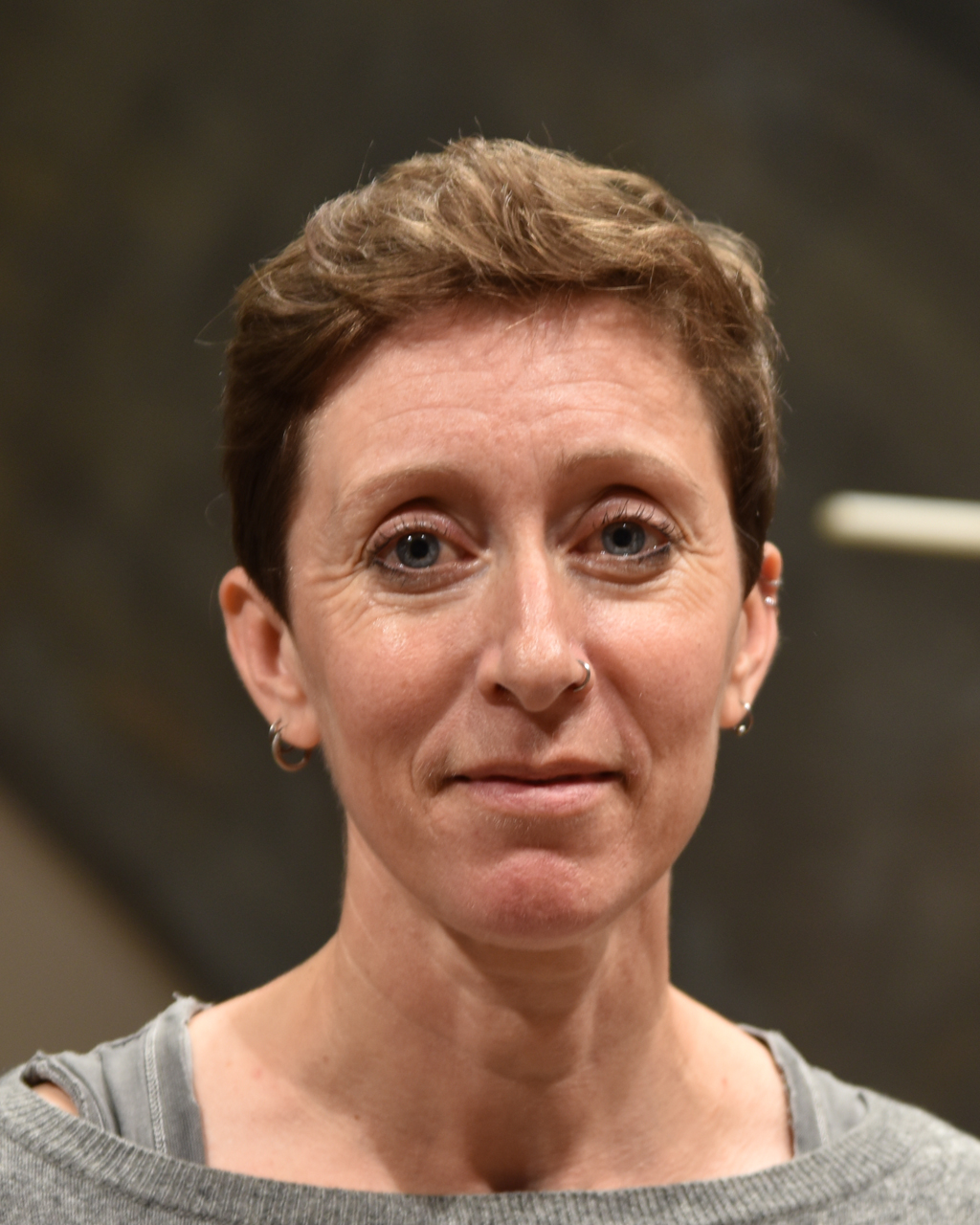
- Killing in 2024
- Born: Newcastle upon Tyne
- Education: King's College, Cambridge (BA); Oxford Brookes (MA)
- Employer: Financial Times
- Awards: Pulitzer Prize for International Reporting (2021)

Alison Killing is a British architect, urban designer, and journalist specializing in open-source intelligence. She received the Pulitzer Prize for International Reporting in 2021.

== Early life ==
Killing was born in Newcastle upon Tyne, and obtained her bachelor's degree from King's College, Cambridge in 2002 before receiving her master's degree from Oxford Brookes in 2004.

== Career ==
Killing worked as an architect in London and Rotterdam, working for Buro Happold and Kees Christiaanse before starting her own studio, Killing Architects, in 2010.

While continuing her work as an architect, Killing began working as a journalist, working with Buzzfeed on an investigation about how Instagram stories can facilitate increased police surveillance.

Killing was part of the team that produced a series of innovative articles that used satellite images, 3D architectural models, and in-person interviews to expose China's vast infrastructure for detaining hundreds of thousands of Muslims in its Xinjiang region and won the 2021 Pulitzer Prize for International Reporting.

In 2023, Killing joined Financial Times as a visual investigations reporter. She has written about the "unravelling" of the Neom development, the murdering of Ukrainian prisoners of war, and the Israel-Gaza war. In 2025, Killing was awarded two Amnesty International Media Awards for her work on extremist settlers in the West Bank and the Russian abduction of Ukrainian children.

Killing is a TED Fellow.

== Personal life ==
Killing lives in Rotterdam.
