= Andrew Marshall (print journalist) =

British journalist and author

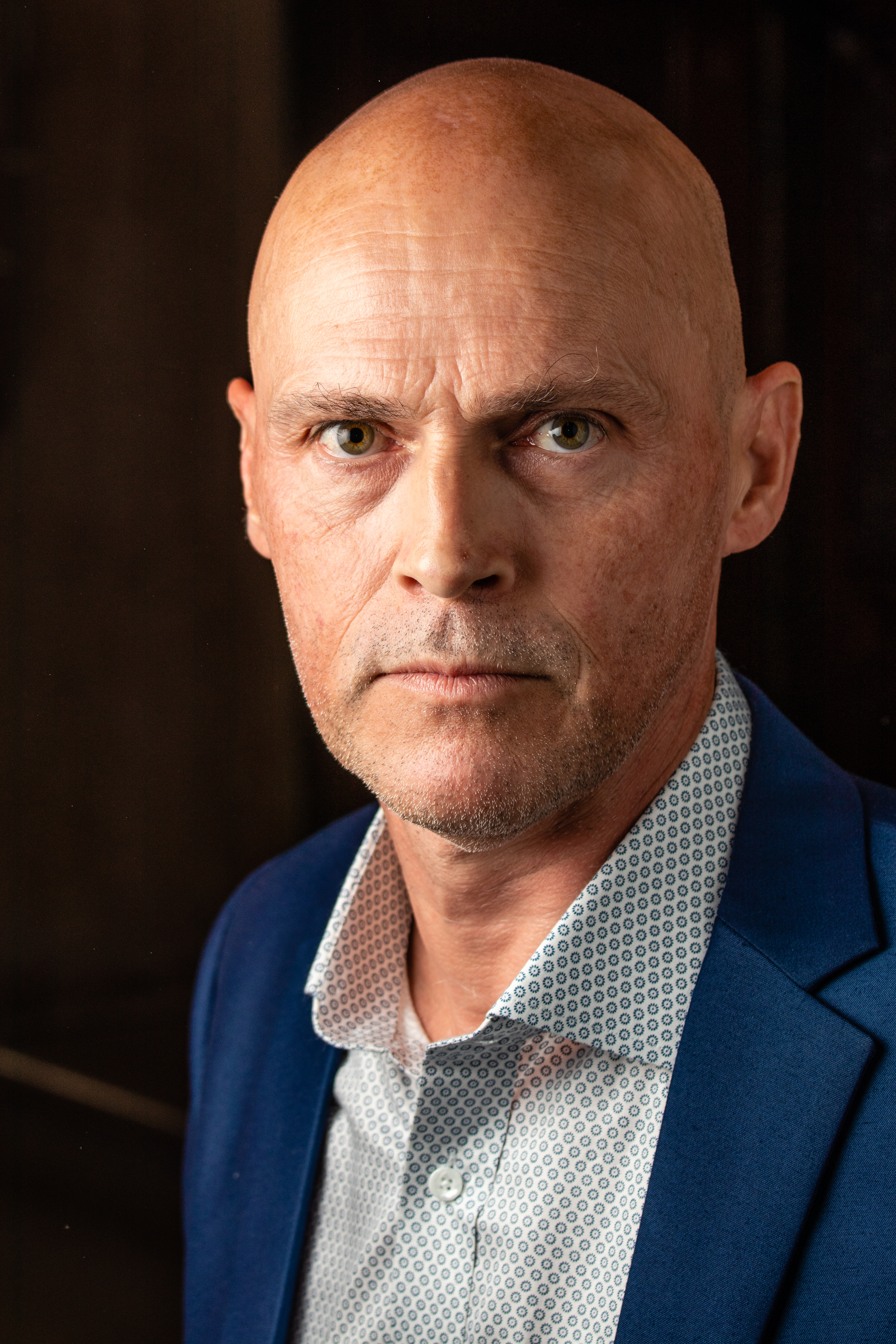
- Born: 1967
- Occupation: Journalist
- Employer: Reuters
- Awards: Pulitzer Prize for International Reporting (2014); Pulitzer Prize for International Reporting (2018)
- Website: andrewmarshall.com

Andrew R.C. Marshall (born 1967) is a British journalist and author living in London, England. In January 2012 he joined Reuters news agency as Southeast Asia Special Correspondent. He won the 2014 Pulitzer Prize for International Reporting along with Jason Szep for their report on the violent persecution of the Rohingya, a Muslim minority in Myanmar. He won his second Pulitzer, the 2018 prize, also for international reporting, along with Clare Baldwin and Manuel Mogato, for exposing the methods of police killing squads in Philippines President Rodrigo Duterte's war on drugs. He graduated from the University of Edinburgh in 1989 with an MA in English literature.

In The Trouser People: a Story of Burma in the Shadow of the Empire, Marshall recounts the adventures of Sir George Scott as he bullied his way through uncharted jungle to establish British colonial rule in Burma and recounts his own adventures as he revisits many of the same places that Scott visited. Marshall is co-author of The Cult at the End of the World, a study of the Aum Shinrikyo.
