= 1991 Pulitzer Prize =

Awards for journalism and related fields

The Pulitzer Prizes for 1991 included not only awards given in all categories, but two separate awards were given for International Reporting:

== Journalism awards ==
- Public Service:
  - Des Moines Register, For reporting by Jane Schorer that, with the victim's consent, named a woman who had been raped—which prompt widespread reconsideration of the traditional media practice of concealing the identity of rape victims.
- Spot News Reporting:
  - Staff of The Miami Herald, For stories profiling a local cult leader, his followers, and their links to several area murders.
- Investigative Reporting:
  - Joseph T. Hallinan and Susan M. Headden of The Indianapolis Star, For their shocking series on medical malpractice in the state.
- Explanatory Journalism:
  - Susan C. Faludi of The Wall Street Journal, For a report on the leveraged buy-out of Safeway Stores, Inc., that revealed the human costs of high finance.
- Beat Reporting:
  - Natalie Angier of The New York Times, For her compelling and illuminating reports on a variety of scientific topics.
- National Reporting:
  - Marjie Lundstrom and Rochelle Sharpe of Gannett News Service, For reporting that disclosed hundreds of child abuse-related deaths go undetected each year as a result of errors by medical examiners.
- International Reporting:
  - Serge Schmemann of The New York Times, For his coverage of the reunification of Germany.
- International Reporting:
  - Caryle Murphy of The Washington Post, For her dispatches from occupied Kuwait, some of which she filed while in hiding from Iraqi authorities.
- Feature Writing:
  - Sheryl James of the St. Petersburg Times, For a compelling series about a mother who abandoned her newborn child and how it affected her life and those of others.
- Commentary:
  - Jim Hoagland of The Washington Post, For searching and prescient columns on events leading up to the Gulf War and on the political problems of Mikhail Gorbachev.
- Criticism:
  - David Shaw of the Los Angeles Times, For his critiques of the way in which the media, including his own paper, reported the McMartin Pre-School child molestation case.
- Editorial Writing:
  - Ron Casey, Harold Jackson and Joey Kennedy of The Birmingham News, For their editorial campaign analyzing inequities in Alabama's tax system and proposing needed reforms.
- Editorial Cartooning:
  - Jim Borgman of The Cincinnati Enquirer
- Spot News Photography:
  - Greg Marinovich of Associated Press, For a series of photographs of supporters of South Africa's African National Congress brutally murdering a man they believed to be a Zulu spy.
- Feature Photography:
  - William Snyder of The Dallas Morning News, For his photographs of ill and orphaned children living in subhuman conditions in Romania.

== Letters awards ==
- Fiction:
  - Rabbit At Rest by John Updike (Alfred A. Knopf)
- History:
  - A Midwife's Tale by Laurel Thatcher Ulrich (Alfred A. Knopf)
- Biography or Autobiography:
  - Jackson Pollock: An American Saga by Steven Naifeh and Gregory White Smith (Clarkson N. Potter)
- Poetry:
  - Near Changes by Mona Van Duyn (Alfred A. Knopf)
- General Nonfiction:
  - The Ants by Bert Holldobler and Edward O. Wilson (Belknap/Harvard University Press)

== Arts awards ==
- Drama:
  - Lost in Yonkers by Neil Simon (Random House)
- Music:
  - Symphony by Shulamit Ran (Theodore Presser Company)

Commissioned by The Philadelphia Orchestra and premiered by that orchestra on October 19, 1990.
