= George Washington High School (Colorado) =

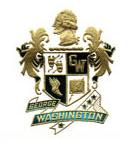

Location
- 655 South Monaco Parkway; Denver, Colorado 80224; United States
- 39°42′20″N 104°54′52″W

Information
- Type: High school
- Motto: We Are Patriot Strong
- Established: 1960 (66 years ago)
- School district: Denver Public Schools
- CEEB code: 060413
- NCES School ID: 080336000352
- Principal: Dackri Davis
- Teaching staff: 69.74 (on a FTE basis)
- Grades: 9–12
- Enrollment: 1,272 (2023–2024)
- Student to teacher ratio: 18.24
- Colors: Green and white
- Athletics conference: Denver Prep League
- Nickname: Patriots
- Website: gwhs.dpsk12.org
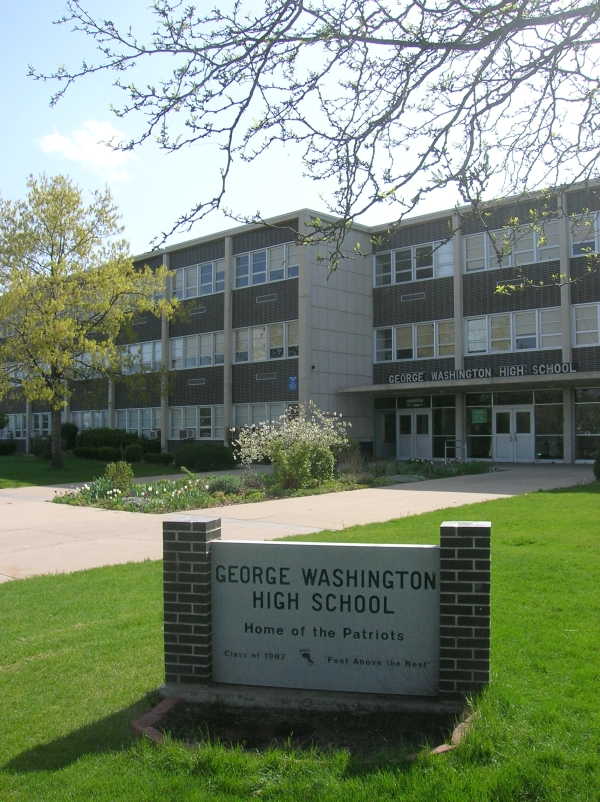
- A view of the south lobby entrance to George Washington High School

George Washington High School is located in Denver, Colorado, United States. GW is a large urban high school serving grades 9–12. George Washington is a part of the Denver Public Schools system.

== Demographics ==
The demographic breakdown of the 1,182 students enrolled in 2019-20 was:

- Native American/Alaskan - 0.4%
- Asian - 4.9%
- Black - 22.5%
- Hispanic - 28.5%
- White - 37.9%
- Multiracial - 5.58%
- Native Hawaiian or Other - 0.2%

47.4% of the students were eligible for free or reduced-price lunches.

== Extracurricular activities ==
=== Boys basketball ===
The George Washington High School boys basketball team plays in the Colorado High School Activities Association 5A class. In both 2017 and 2018, GW boys basketball was the Colorado state tournament runner-up. The boys basketball team won the State Championship in 1994. The team was led by future NBA star and head coach Chauncey Billups.

=== Newspaper ===
The school newspaper is The George Washington Surveyor, which is part of the High School National Ad Network. The paper got its name from president George Washington's lifelong association with geography and cartography. The Surveyor was the winner of the National Pacemaker Award from the National Scholastic Press Association in 2007, 2008, and 2009.

=== Robotics ===
George Washington's robotics functions through FIRST Robotics, with the FIRST Robotics Competition team 1410 (founded 2004 as the Patriotbots, rebranded in 2008 as The Kraken), and FIRST Tech Challenge teams 17153 (founded 2019), 18677(founded 2020), 18678(founded 2020). The Kraken has won 3 regionals and 12 awards.

=== Speech and debate ===
The George Washington Speech And Debate team consists of over 150 students, and is ranked 3rd in the nation as of March 1, 2023 by the National Speech and Debate Association.

== Notable alumni ==
- Chauncey Billups, former NBA player and head coach for the Portland Trail Blazers. Won a championship and Finals MVP in 2004 with the Detroit Pistons
- Rodney Billups, assistant coach for the Portland Trail Blazers of the NBA.
- Sierra Boggess, theatre actress and singer
- Chris Brewer, professional football player
- Doug DeMuro, YouTube car journalist
- Anita Diamant, author of The Red Tent and other fiction and non-fiction books
- Jonathan Freedman, journalist, winner of the 1987 Pulitzer Prize for Editorial Writing
- Sharon R. Long, plant biologist
- Ostell Miles, football player
- Martin Moran, Broadway actor and author of The Tricky Part
- Mark Mullaney, former NFL defensive end, Minnesota Vikings
- Greg Primus, former NFL player for the Chicago Bears
- Dianne Reeves, jazz vocalist, winner of Grammy Award for Best Jazz Vocal Album in 2001, 2002, 2004, and 2006
- Ed Smith, former NFL player for the Denver Broncos
