= 1938 Pulitzer Prize =

Awards for journalism and related fields

The following are the Pulitzer Prizes for 1938.

The prizes were announced on May 2, 1938, at the annual alumni dinner of the Columbia University School of Journalism. They were presented by university president Nicholas Murray Butler and dean Carl W. Ackerman. The announcement was broadcast nationally on the NBC Red Network.

== Journalism awards ==
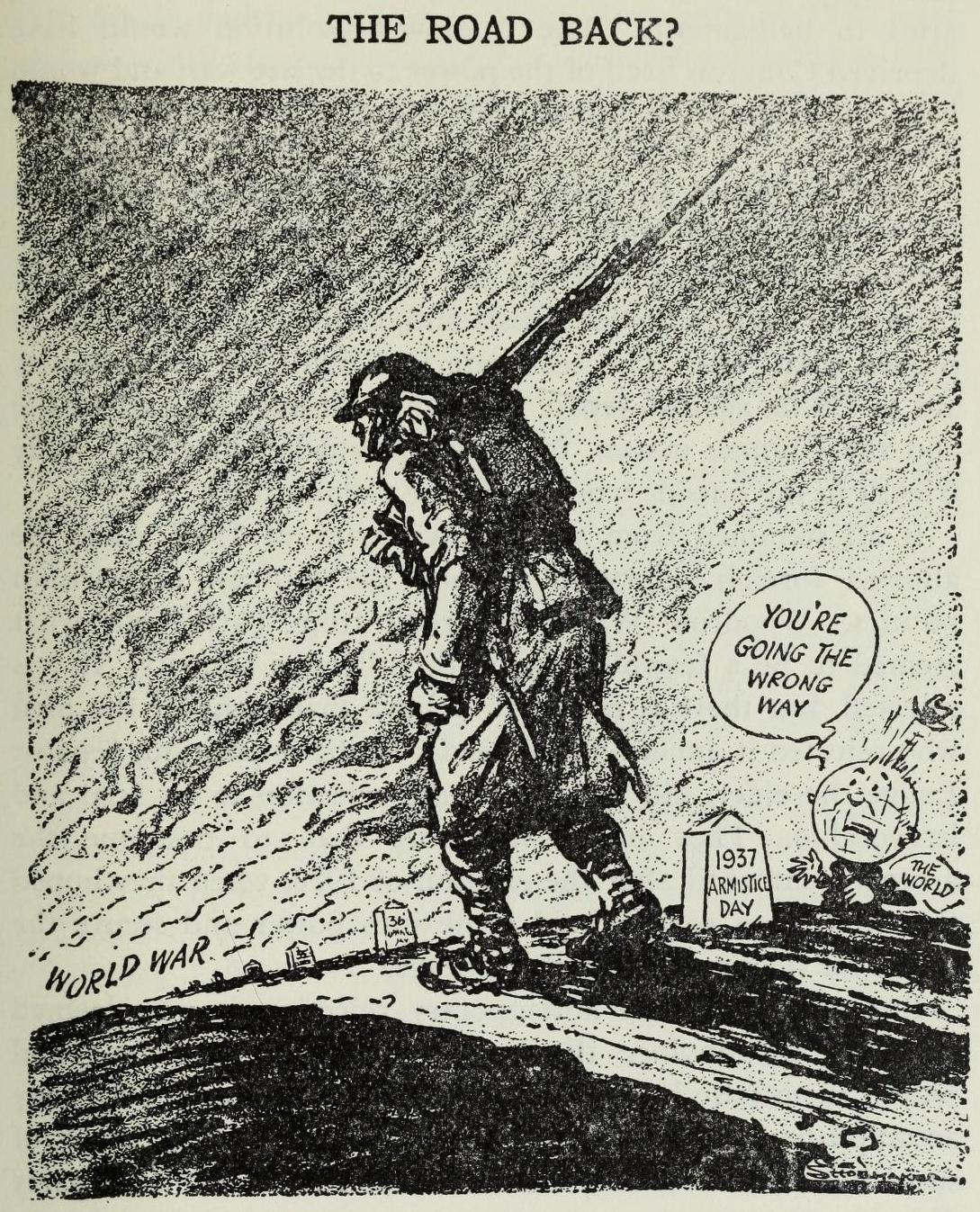
"The Road Back?", the prize-winning editorial cartoon.

- Public Service:
  - Bismarck Tribune for its news reports and editorials entitled "Self Help in the Dust Bowl".
- Reporting:
  - Raymond Sprigle of the Pittsburgh Post-Gazette for his series of articles, supported by photostats of the essential documents, exposing the one-time membership of Supreme Court Justice Hugo Black in the Ku Klux Klan.
- Correspondence:
  - Arthur Krock of The New York Times for his exclusive authorized interview with the President of the United States on February 27, 1937.
- Editorial Writing:
  - William Wesley Waymack of the Register and Tribune (Des Moines, Iowa) for his distinguished editorial writing during the year.
- Editorial Cartooning:
  - Vaughn Shoemaker of the Chicago Daily News for "The Road Back?"
- Special Citations:
  - The Edmonton Journal was given a special bronze plaque for "its leadership in the defence of the freedom of press in the province of Alberta", for its campaign against the Accurate News and Information Act. Engraved certificates were given to 95 other Alberta newspapers for their participation in fighting the law.

== Letters and Drama Awards ==
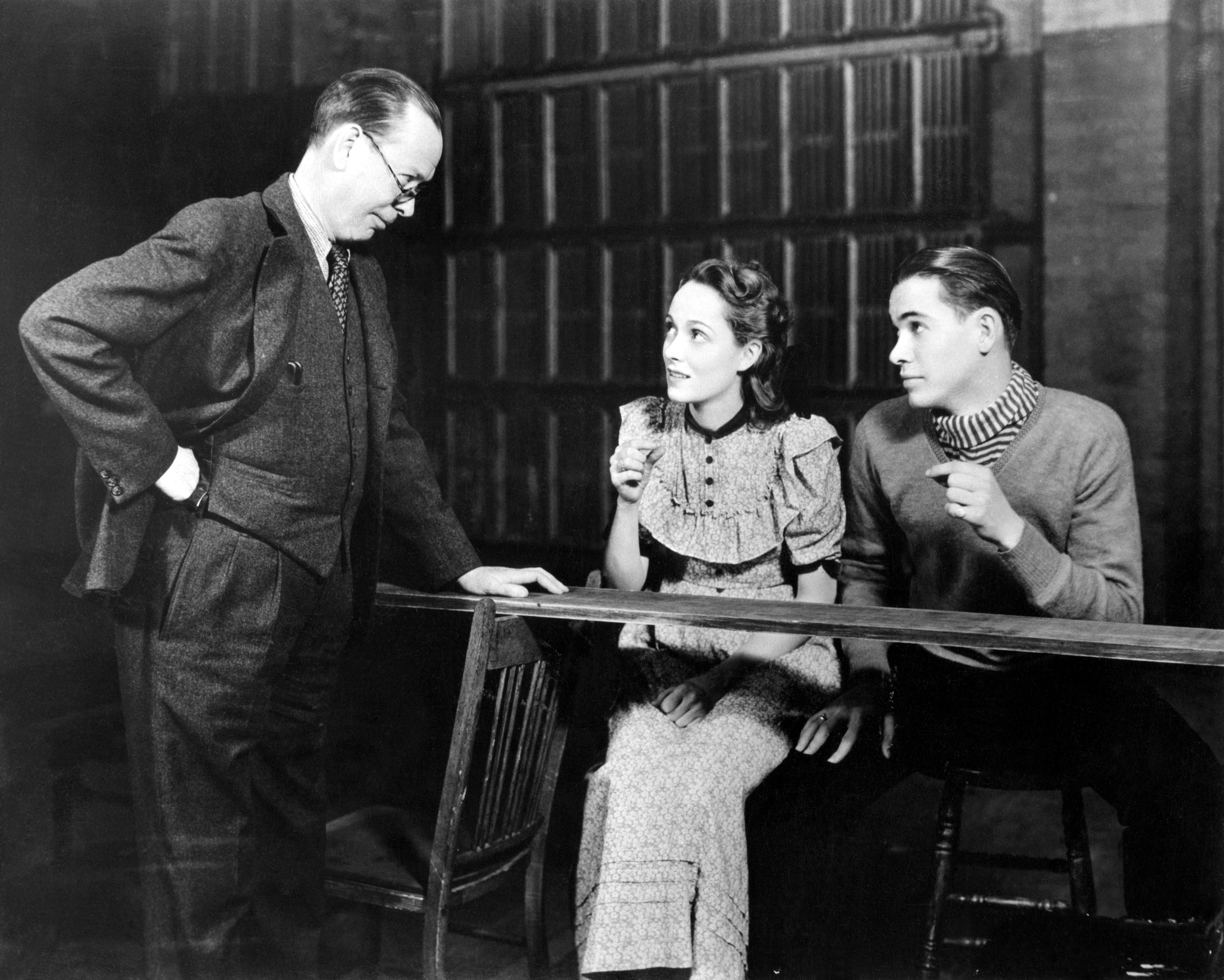
Frank Craven, Martha Scott and John Craven in the Broadway production of the prize-winning drama, Our Town

- Novel:
  - The Late George Apley by John P. Marquand (Little).
- Drama:
  - Our Town by Thornton Wilder (Coward).
- History:
  - The Road to Reunion, 1865-1900 by Paul Herman Buck (Little).
- Biography or Autobiography:
  - Andrew Jackson, 2 vols. by Marquis James (Bobbs).
- Biography or Autobiography:
  - Pedlar's Progress by Odell Shepard (Little).
- Poetry:
  - Cold Morning Sky by Marya Zaturenska (Macmillan).
