= John Maurice =

John Maurice may refer to:

- John Maurice, Prince of Nassau-Siegen
- John D. Maurice, American journalist
