= 1952 Pulitzer Prize =

Awards for journalism and related fields

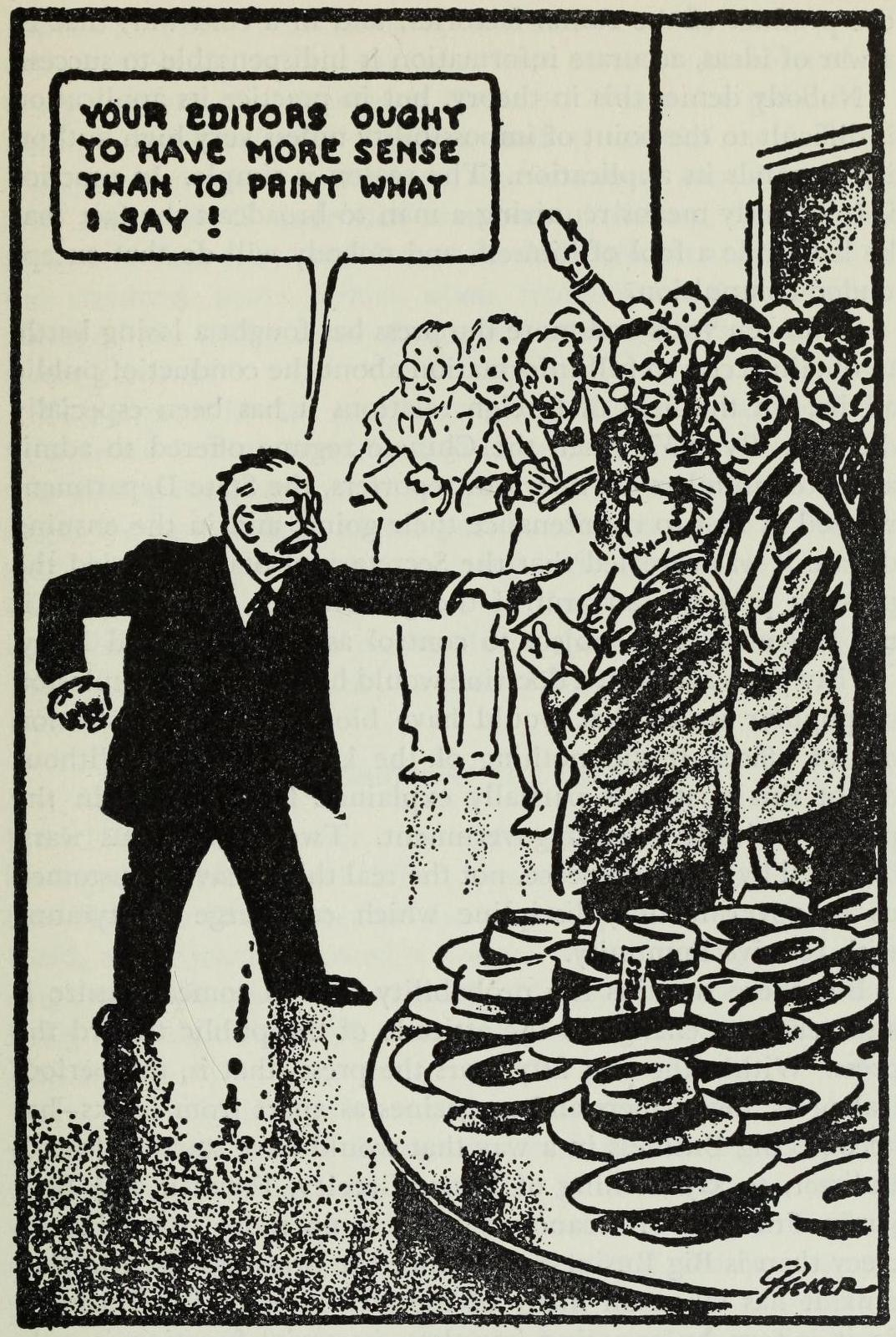
The prize-winning editorial cartoon by Fred L. Packer

The prize-winning photographs by Don Ultang (top) and John Robinson (bottom)
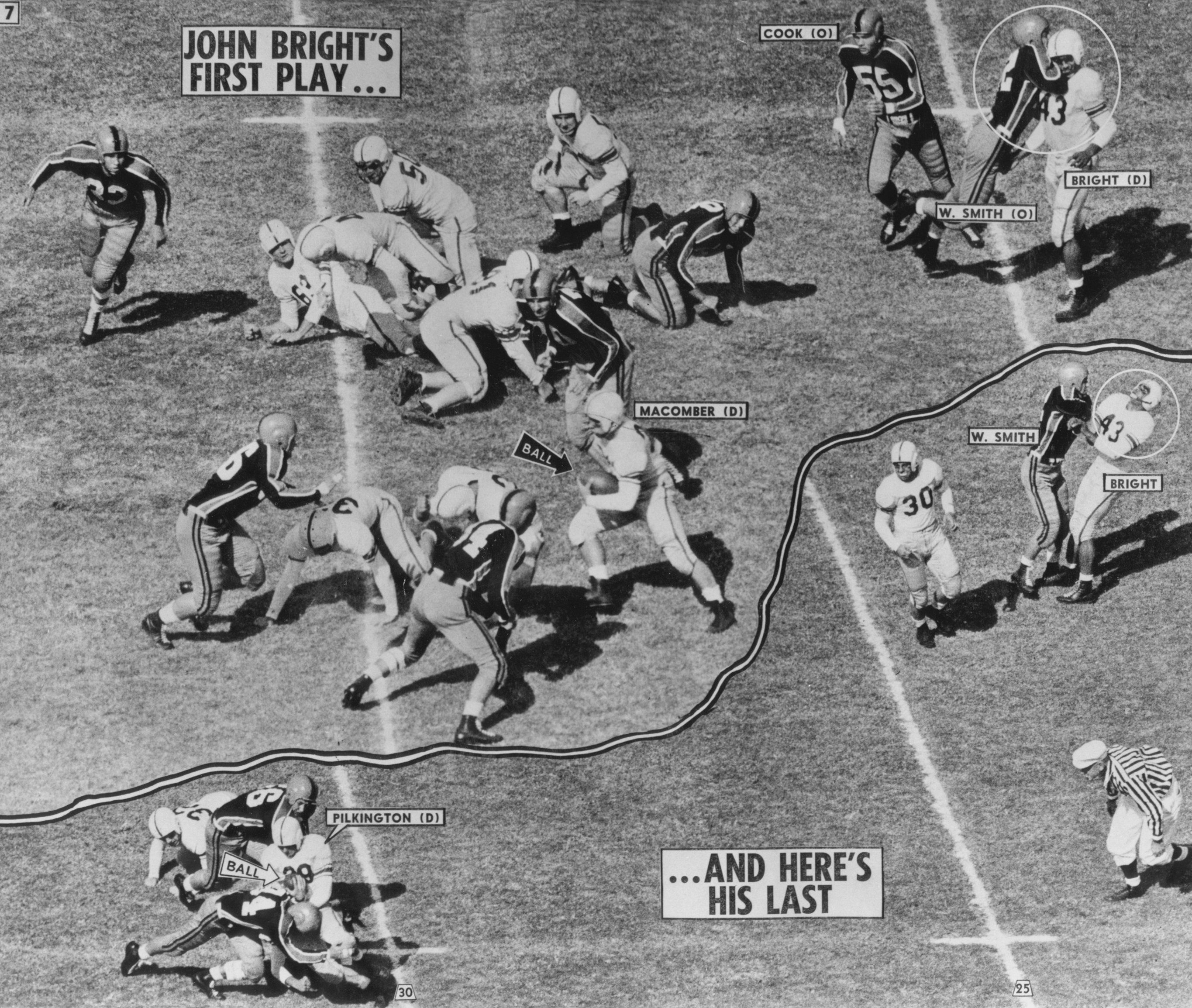
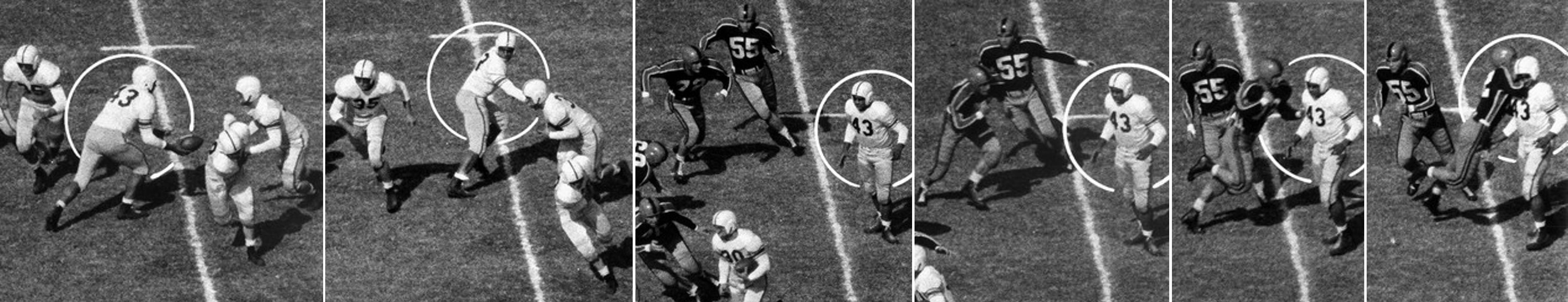

The following are the Pulitzer Prizes for 1952.

== Journalism awards ==
- Public Service:
  - St. Louis Post-Dispatch, for its investigation and disclosures of widespread corruption in the Internal Revenue Bureau and other departments of the government.
- Local Reporting:
  - George De Carvalho of the San Francisco Chronicle, for his stories of a "ransom racket" extorting money from Chinese in the United States for relatives held in Red China.
- National Reporting:
  - Anthony Leviero of The New York Times, for his exclusive article of April 21, 1951, disclosing the record of conversations between President Truman and General of the Army Douglas MacArthur at Wake Island in their conference of October, 1950.
- International Reporting:
  - John M. Hightower of the Associated Press, for the sustained quality of his coverage of news of international affairs during the year.
- Editorial Writing:
  - Louis La Coss of the St. Louis Globe-Democrat, for his editorial entitled, "Low Estate of Public Morals".
- Editorial Cartooning:
  - Fred L. Packer of the New York Mirror, for "Your Editors Ought to Have More Sense Than to Print What I Say!"
- Photography:
  - John Robinson and Don Ultang of the Des Moines Register and Tribune, for their sequence of pictures of the Drake-Oklahoma A & M football game of October 20, 1951, in which player Johnny Bright's jaw was broken.
- Special Citations:
  - Max Kase of the New York Journal American, for his exclusive exposures of bribery and other forms of corruption in the popular American sport of basketball, which exposures tended to restore confidence in the game's integrity.
  - The Kansas City Star, for the news coverage of the great regional flood of 1951 in Kansas and Northwestern Missouri; a distinguished example of editing and reporting that also gave the advance information that achieved the maximum of public protection.

== Letters, Drama and Music Awards ==
- Fiction:
  - The Caine Mutiny by Herman Wouk (Doubleday).
- Drama:
  - The Shrike by Joseph Kramm (Random House).
- History:
  - The Uprooted by Oscar Handlin (Little).
- Biography or Autobiography:
  - Charles Evans Hughes by Merlo J. Pusey (Macmillan).
- Poetry:
  - Collected Poems by Marianne Moore (Macmillan).
- Music:
  - Symphony Concertante by Gail Kubik, performed at The Town Hall, January 7, 1952.
