= Frederick Packer =

Frederick Packer may refer to:

- Fred L. Packer (1886–1956), American illustrator and cartoonist
- Frederick Augustus Packer (1839–1902), Australian composer
