= Michael Lindenberger =

American journalist and editor (died 2022)

- Born: Michael A. Lindenberger; Louisville, Kentucky, U.S.
- Died: December 12, 2022; Kansas City, Missouri, U.S.
- Education: Western Kentucky University; University of Louisville
- Occupations: Journalist; editorial writer; editor
- Awards: Pulitzer Prize for Editorial Writing (2022)

Michael A. Lindenberger (died December 12, 2022) was an American journalist and editorial writer. In 2022 he shared the Pulitzer Prize for Editorial Writing with Lisa Falkenberg, Joe Holley and Luis Carrasco for "The Big Lie", a series of Houston Chronicle editorials on voter suppression and false claims of election fraud in Texas.

A native of Louisville, Kentucky, Lindenberger reported for the Courier Journal and spent 14 years at The Dallas Morning News before joining the Houston Chronicle as deputy opinion editor in 2018. He became vice president and editorial page editor of The Kansas City Star in July 2022 and died five months later, aged 51.

== Early life and education ==
Lindenberger was a native of Louisville, Kentucky. The youngest of five children, he spent his first four years in foster homes in the city before being adopted in 1975 by John and Kathleen Lindenberger; his brother Hudson later attributed his lasting interest in social justice to that beginning.

He first worked as a journalist on the student newspaper of Trinity High School. In the early 1990s he was a staff member of the College Heights Herald at Western Kentucky University, where an early assignment sent him across the state to report on cuts to university funding, before he transferred to the University of Louisville. There he served two terms as editor-in-chief of the student newspaper The Louisville Cardinal in the mid-1990s; while in that post he and two others drove through the night to Washington to cover the Million Man March, an assignment he later cited as formative.

Lindenberger took a bachelor's degree in political science from the University of Louisville in 2003 and a law degree from the university's Louis D. Brandeis School of Law in 2006. He interviewed with law firms in Louisville after qualifying, but told colleagues that his "heart was still in journalism".

== Career ==
=== Kentucky ===
Lindenberger was chief political writer for the alternative weekly Louisville Eccentric Observer and then joined the Courier Journal, where he was a regional reporter and bureau chief in Elizabethtown and also covered the state legislature. He left the paper about 18 years before his death. Colleagues recalled that he liked to say he had interviewed every governor of Kentucky since Wallace Wilkinson.

Over roughly a decade he also wrote more than 100 articles as a contract contributor to Time and Time.com, working as a national legal affairs correspondent and covering subjects including the legal status of same-sex marriage. Earlier in his career he worked at small newspapers in Portland, Tennessee; Jeffersonville, Indiana; and Owensboro, Kentucky.

=== The Dallas Morning News ===
Lindenberger spent 14 years at The Dallas Morning News, reporting on city hall and transportation and serving as the paper's Washington correspondent for business; in 2016 he joined its editorial board as a columnist and editorial writer. He spent the 2012–13 academic year at Stanford University as a John S. Knight Journalism Fellow.

=== Houston Chronicle ===
In 2018 Lindenberger moved to the Houston Chronicle as deputy opinion editor, running the day-to-day work of the paper's eight-member editorial board and writing a regular column. In 2020 he was named Star Opinion Writer of the Year by the Texas Associated Press Managing Editors.

=== Pulitzer Prize ===
In May 2022 Lindenberger, Lisa Falkenberg, Joe Holley and Luis Carrasco won the Pulitzer Prize for Editorial Writing for "The Big Lie", a series of Chronicle editorials that the Pulitzer board honoured as "a campaign that, with original reporting, revealed voter suppression tactics, rejected the myth of widespread voter fraud and argued for sensible voting reforms". The editorials argued that Texas officials had used false claims about fraud to justify restricting access to the ballot, and called on Senator Ted Cruz to resign over his part in casting doubt on the result of the 2020 presidential election.

Falkenberg, the Chronicle's vice president and editor of opinion, later singled out his editorial headlined "What happens when a GOP state tells the truth about voter fraud? Ask Kentucky" as characteristic of his approach, combining an argument for pragmatic compromise with advocacy for his home state. Speaking after the award, Lindenberger said that opinion journalism "changes lives because it changes conditions in the state".

=== The Kansas City Star ===
In July 2022 Lindenberger left Houston for The Kansas City Star, where he became vice president and editorial page editor, a position he had wanted in order to lead an opinion department. Announcing the appointment, the paper's then editor Mike Fannin said Lindenberger believed in "well-reported, incisive commentary and editorial writing that serves local communities" and had a record of distinguished journalism behind him.

== Teaching and other work ==
For more than a decade Lindenberger taught communications courses, among them mass communications law and ethics, at the University of Houston's Jack J. Valenti School of Communication.

A keen student of cocktails, he launched Bourbon Story Magazine in 2014; it closed the following year after failing to meet its financial targets, and in 2019 he started a Bourbon Story website and newsletter with a wider remit covering drinks and their cultural impact, publishing there until May 2021. At the time of his death he had been working for about ten years on a book about the Kentucky-born writer Robert Penn Warren.

== Death ==
Lindenberger died on December 12, 2022, at his home in Kansas City, Missouri, at the age of 51. His brother said he was believed to have died the previous day, a year to the day after the death of his partner, the poet Phil Clore. He was survived by four siblings, five nieces and a nephew; his parents and Clore predeceased him.

== Legacy ==
In May 2023 Lindenberger was named posthumously, with Falkenberg, Holley and Nick Powell, as a finalist for the Pulitzer Prize in opinion writing for Chronicle editorials on the Uvalde school shooting.

The University of Louisville established the Michael A. Lindenberger Memorial Scholarship, funded by colleagues at The Kansas City Star together with his family and friends, for student journalists working on The Louisville Cardinal. A celebration of his life was held on February 25, 2023, attended by more than 150 relatives, friends, teachers and colleagues.
