= 1975 Pulitzer Prize =

Awards for journalism and related fields

The Pulitzer Prizes for 1975, the 59th annual prizes, were ratified by the Pulitzer Prize advisory board on April 11, 1975, and by the trustees of Columbia University on May 5. For the first time, the role of accepting or rejecting recommendations of the advisory board was delegated by the trustees to the university's president, William J. McGill; the change was prompted by the desire of the trustees to distance themselves from the appearance of approval of controversial awards based on work involving what some considered to be illegal leaks, such as the 1972 Pulitzer Prize awarded for the publication of the Pentagon Papers.

It was also the first year that the prize for editorial cartooning went to a comic strip artist (Garry Trudeau, writer/artist of Doonesbury), and the first year that a film critic won a Pulitzer (Roger Ebert). Dumas Malone, 83, become the prize's oldest recipient.

== Journalism awards ==
The list of winners and the citations accompanying the award, are taken from the Pulitzer Prize website.

- Public Service:
  - The Boston Globe, for its massive and balanced coverage of the Boston school desegregation crisis.
- Local General or Spot News Reporting:
  - Staff of Xenia Daily Gazette (Xenia, Ohio), for its coverage, under enormous difficulties, of the tornado that wrecked the city on April 3, 1974.
- Local Investigative Specialized Reporting:
  - The Indianapolis Star, for its disclosures of local police corruption and dilatory law enforcement, resulting in a cleanup of both the Police Department and the office of the County Prosecutor.
- National Reporting:
  - Donald L. Barlett and James B. Steele of The Philadelphia Inquirer, for their series Auditing the Internal Revenue Service, which exposed the unequal application of Federal tax laws.
- International Reporting:
  - William Mullen, reporter, and Ovie Carter, photographer of the Chicago Tribune, for their coverage of famine in Africa and India.
- Commentary:
  - Mary McGrory of the Washington Star, for her commentary on public affairs during 1974.
- Criticism:
  - Roger Ebert of the Chicago Sun-Times, for his film criticism during 1974.
- Editorial Writing:
  - John Daniell Maurice of the Charleston Daily Mail, for his editorials about the Kanawha County schoolbook controversy.
- Editorial Cartooning:
  - Garry Trudeau, distributed by Universal Press Syndicate, for his cartoon strip Doonesbury.

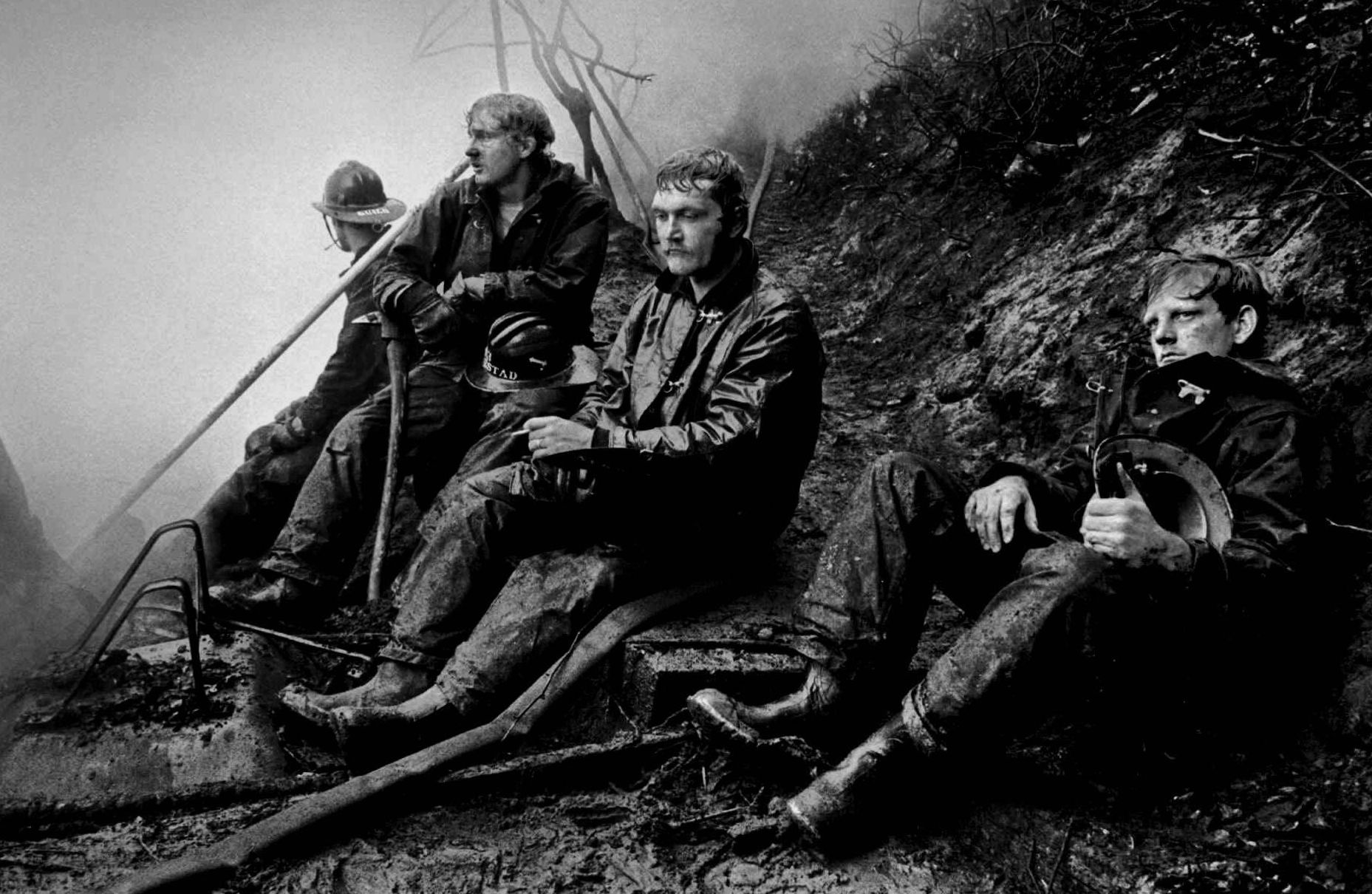
"Lull in the Battle", the prize-winning spot news photograph

- Spot News Photography:
  - Gerald H. Gay of The Seattle Times, for his photograph of four exhausted firemen, Lull in the Battle.
- Feature Photography:
  - Matthew Lewis of The Washington Post, for his photographs in color and black and white.

== Letters, Drama and Music awards ==
The list of winners and the citations accompanying the award, are taken from the Pulitzer Prize website.

- Fiction:
  - The Killer Angels by Michael Shaara (McKay)
- Drama:
  - Seascape by Edward Albee (Atheneum)
- History:
  - Jefferson and His Time, Vols. I-V by Dumas Malone (Little)
- Biography or Autobiography:
  - The Power Broker: Robert Moses and the Fall of New York by Robert Caro (Knopf)
- Poetry:
  - Turtle Island by Gary Snyder (New Directions)
- General Nonfiction:
  - Pilgrim at Tinker Creek by Annie Dillard (Harper's Magazine Press)
- Music:
  - From the Diary of Virginia Woolf by Dominick Argento (Boosey & Hawkes)
    For medium voice and piano, commissioned by the Schubert Club of St. Paul, and premiered January 5, 1975, in Orchestra Hall, Minneapolis.
