= John Strohmeyer =

American journalist (1924–2010)

John Strohmeyer (June 26, 1924 – March 3, 2010) won the 1972 Pulitzer Prize for Editorial Writing for his editorial writing on reducing racial tensions in Bethlehem, Pennsylvania.

== Early life and education ==
Strohmeyer was born in Boston, Massachusetts on June 26, 1924. After working as a night reporter for the now-defunct Bethlehem Globe-Times in Bethlehem, Pennsylvania while attending Moravian College, he spent three years in the United States Navy during World War II, ultimately attaining the rank of lieutenant. A graduate of Muhlenberg College (1947) and the Columbia University Graduate School of Journalism (1948), Strohmeyer was a Nieman Fellow at Harvard University during the 1952–1953 academic year while employed by The Providence Journal.

== Career ==
In 1956, Strohmeyer returned to Bethlehem, Pennsylvania, where he served as editor of the Globe-Times until 1984. He won an Alicia Patterson Journalism Fellowship in 1984 to research and write about the decline of the American steel industry, a project that evolved into Crisis in Bethlehem: Big Steel's Struggle to Survive, published by Adler & Adler in 1986 and University of Pittsburgh Press in 1994.

In 1992, Robert Atwood recruited Strohmeyer to teach journalism at the University of Alaska Anchorage in a position endowed by Atwood. While there, Strohmeyer wrote Extreme Conditions: Big Oil and the Transformation of Alaska. Strohmeyer also wrote Atwood's biography, which was never published due to a dispute which arose after Atwood's death between Strohmeyer and Atwood's daughter Elaine.

== Death ==
Strohmeyer died of heart failure on March 3, 2010, in Crystal River, Florida.
