= Maria Henson =

American journalist and editor (born 1960)

- Born: June 17, 1960 (age 65)
- Education: Wake Forest University (BA)
- Occupations: Journalist; editor
- Awards: Pulitzer Prize for Editorial Writing (1992)

Maria Henson (born June 17, 1960) is an American journalist and editor, who has worked for several newspapers. She is currently an Associate Vice President at Wake Forest University in North Carolina, where she lectures in journalism and is editor of the university publication Wake Forest Magazine.

Henson graduated from Wake Forest University in 1982 with a Bachelor of Arts degree, majoring in English, and was a Nieman Fellow at Harvard University in 1993–94, and a Jefferson Fellow at the East-West Center at the University of Hawaii in 2007.

In 1992, Henson won the Pulitzer Prize for Editorial Writing, for editorials about battered women in Kentucky published in the Herald-Leader newspaper of Lexington, Kentucky. In 2005, she edited a series for the Sacramento Bee about the Hetch Hetchy Valley, which won the Pulitzer Prize for Editorial Writing for writer Tom Philp.
