= William J. Dorvillier =

American journalist

William Joseph Dorvillier (April 24, 1908 - May 5, 1993) was the 1961 recipient of the Pulitzer Prize for Editorial Writing.

== Biography ==
Dorvillier was born in North Adams, Massachusetts, in 1908. Dorvillier was the founder, publisher and editor of The San Juan Star. With its first issue in November 1959 it was an English language paper published in Puerto Rico.

Dorvillier wrote a series of twenty editorials criticizing the Catholic Church's interference in the 1960 general elections in Puerto Rico, where 90% of the population was Roman Catholic. Dorvillier's editorials produced a response from Puerto Rico's Roman Catholic Diocesan Bishop James Edward McManus, which The San Juan Star published in its entirety.

Dorvillier had been in the newspaper industry for 26 years when he won the Pulitzer Prize in 1961. Until it ceased operations in the summer of 2008, the Star was the only Pulitzer Prize-winning publication in Puerto Rico and while every one of its Spanish-language competitors in 1961 were long gone, it continued publishing for 47 years.

Dorvillier died on May 5, 1993, in Concord, New Hampshire.
