= Jonathan Freedman =

American journalist, writer and social activist

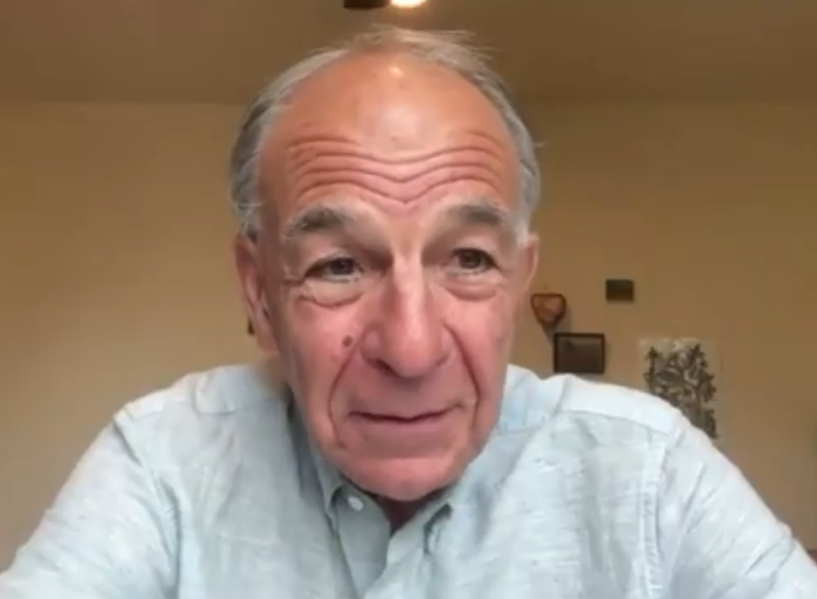
- In an online discussion in 2025
- Born: April 11, 1950 (age 75)
- Education: Columbia College (BA)
- Occupation: Journalist
- Awards: Pulitzer Prize for Editorial Writing (1987)

Jonathan Freedman (born April 11, 1950) is an American journalist, writer, and social activist who won the 1987 Pulitzer Prize for Editorial Writing.

== Biography ==
Freedman was born in Rochester, Minnesota, where his father finished his residency at Mayo Clinic. The family relocated to Denver, and Freedman graduated from George Washington High School in 1968. He went on to study at Columbia College and received his A.B. in literature in 1972 and earned a fellowship that allowed him to travel through Central and South America.

He began his journalism career as a reporter for the Associated Press in São Paulo and Rio de Janeiro during 1974–75. He then became a freelance writer and lived in Washington, D.C., Spain, Portugal, and San Francisco until he was hired by The San Diego Union-Tribune in 1981 as an investigative editorial writer.

During his tenure at the newspaper, he was a finalist for the Pulitzer Prize for Editorial Writing in 1983 and 1984, and won the award in 1987 for writing about immigration across the Mexico–United States border. His series of editorials, which lasted for six years, was instrumental in the passing of the Immigration Reform and Control Act of 1986, the first major immigration reform act in 34 years, which granted legalization to over two million people.

== Published works ==
- The Man Who'd Bounce the World. Turtle Island Press, 1979. ISBN 0932284140
- From Cradle to Grave: The Human Face of Poverty in America, Atheneum, 1993. ISBN 0689121261
- The Last Brazil of Benjamin East: A Novel, Bright Light Press, Palo Alto, California, 2015. ISBN 1939555108
- Solito, Solita: Crossing Borders with Youth Refugees from Central America, Haymarket Books, 2019. ISBN 1608466183
- Wall of Fame: One Teacher, One Class, and the Power to Save Schools and Transform Lives, AVID Center, 2020 ASIN B088HB8P82

== Awards ==
- Pulitzer Prize for Editorial Writing, 1987

== Personal life ==
Freedman is married to Isabel Rooney, who is a medical director at Genentech, working in experimental cancer therapy. He has four children and three grandchildren from his two marriages.
