= Joseph T. Hallinan =

American journalist and author

Joseph T. "Joe" Hallinan is an American author and journalist for The New York Times, Chicago Tribune, The Sunday Times and The Wall Street Journal — on topics on topics ranging from medical malpractice to the criminal justice system and the associated prison industry in the United States.

While a journalist with The Indianapolis Star he and Susan M. Headden shared the 1991 Pulitzer Prize for Investigative Reporting "for their shocking series on medical malpractice in the state." Hallinan was named a Nieman Fellow at Harvard. He has written Going Up the River: Travels in a Prison Nation (2001).

Hallinan has taught at a number of American colleges and universities, and was most recently a visiting professor at Vanderbilt University. He has appeared on a variety of radio and television programs in the U.S. and abroad, including NPR's Fresh Air with Teri Gross and The O'Reilly Factor on Fox News.

Hallinan is a 1984 magna cum laude graduate of Boston University. He lives in Chicago with his wife, Pamela Taylor, and their three children.

== Books ==
- Errornomics
- Why We Make Mistakes: How We Look Without Seeing, Forget Things in Seconds, And Are All Pretty Sure We Are Way Above Average
- Going Up The River: Travels in a Prison Nation
- Kidding Ourselves
