= Ostell Miles =

American football player and convict

No. 36
- Position: Running back

Personal information
- Born: August 6, 1970 (age 56); Denver, Colorado, U.S.
- Listed height: 6 ft 0 in (1.83 m)
- Listed weight: 236 lb (107 kg)

Career information
- High school: Washington (Denver)
- College: Houston
- NFL draft: 1992: 9th round, 226th overall pick

Career history
- Cincinnati Bengals (1992–1993); Denver Broncos (1995)*
- * Offseason or practice squad member only

Career NFL statistics
- Rushing yards: 78
- Rushing average: 2.6
- Touchdowns: 1
- Stats at Pro Football Reference

Odell Shawn Miles (born August 6, 1970) is an American former professional football player who was a running back for two seasons with the Cincinnati Bengals of the National Football League (NFL). He was selected by the Bengals in the ninth round of the 1992 NFL draft. He played college football at Pasadena City College before transferring to the Houston Cougars.

== Early life and college ==
Odell Shawn Miles was born on August 6, 1970, in Denver, Colorado. He attended George Washington High School in Denver.

Miles played college football at Pasadena City College from 1989 to 1990. He transferred to play for the Houston Cougars of the University of Houston in 1991. He rushed 50 times for 360 yards and one touchdown during the 1991 season while also catching six passes for 39 yards.

== Professional career ==
Miles was selected by the Cincinnati Bengals in the ninth round, with the 226th overall pick, of the 1992 NFL draft. He officially signed with the team on July 17. He played in 11 games for the Bengals in 1992, recording eight carries for 22 yards and eight kick returns for 128 yards. Miles appeared in 15 games, starting two, during the 1993 season, totaling 22 rushing attempts for 56 yards and one touchdown, six receptions for 89 yards, and four kick returns for 65 yards. He was released by the Bengals on August 1, 1994.

Miles signed with the Denver Broncos on March 30, 1995. He was released on July 11, 1995.

== Legal issues ==
After his playing career, he spent time in jail after arrests for theft, assault, motor vehicle theft, forgery and identity theft. He and two others were indicted in January 2015 for posing as a towing company to steal vehicles.
