= Andie Dominick =

American journalist and editorial writer

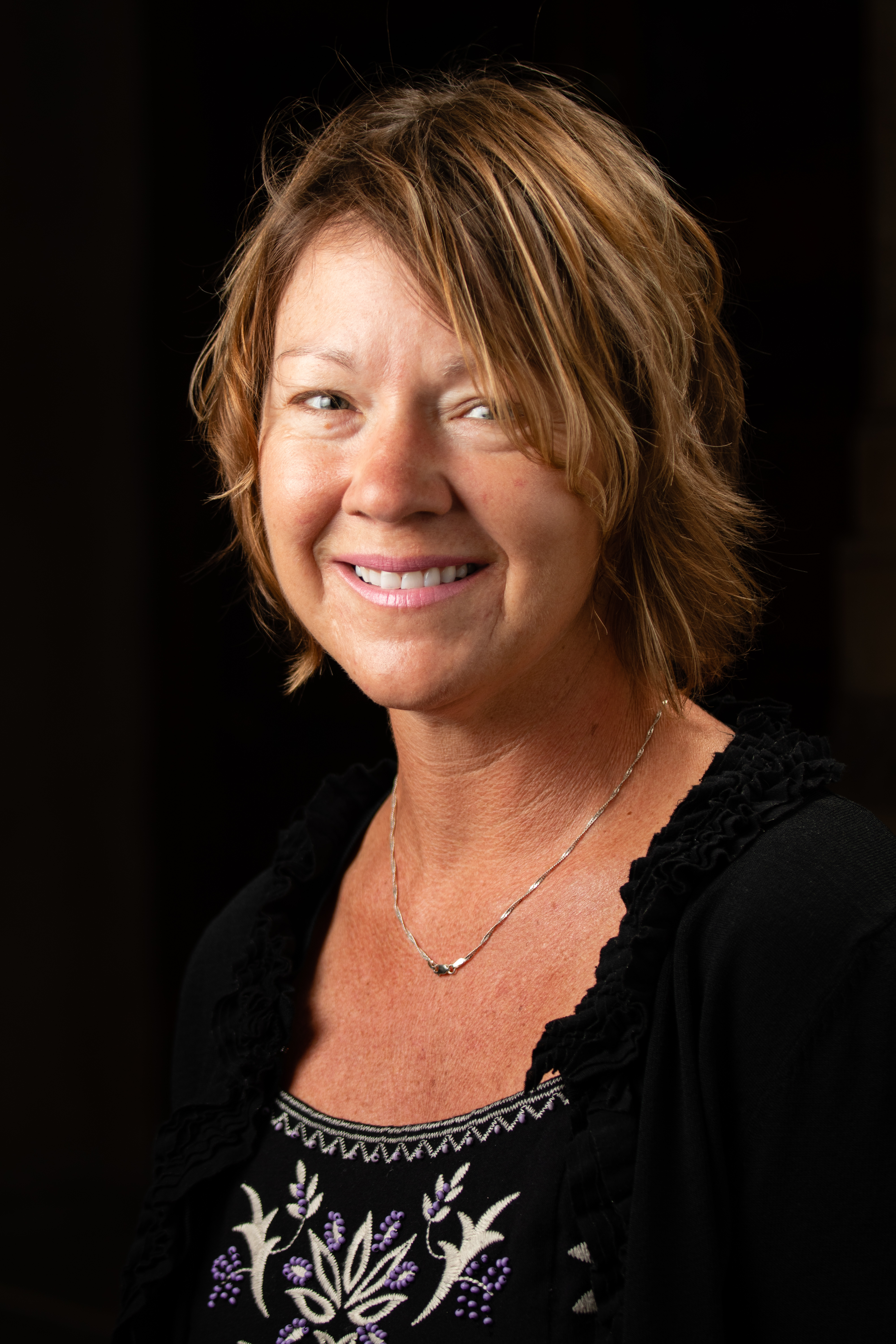
- Dominick at the 2018 Pulitzer Prizes awards ceremony
- Born: 1971 (age 54–55) (Note: In 2018, Dominick was reported to be 47); Iowa, U.S.
- Education: Iowa State University (BA, MA)
- Occupation: Journalist
- Spouse: Doug
- Children: 3
- Awards: 2018, Pulitzer Prize for Editorial Writing

Andie Dominick (born 1971) is an editorial writer at the Des Moines Register. She received the 2018 Pulitzer Prize for Editorial Writing for "examining the damaging consequences for poor Iowa residents of privatizing the state’s administration of Medicaid."

== Early life and education ==
Dominick was born and raised in Iowa. Her older sister Denise, whom she idolized, was diagnosed with juvenile diabetes as a baby. As a child, Dominick would retrieve her sisters needles from the trash and use them as squirt guns, until she herself was diagnosed with the disease at the age of nine. Dominick attended and graduated from Iowa State University in 1994, and earned her Master's degree in literature and creative writing three years later.

== Career ==
After graduating from Iowa State, Dominick published her first book titled "Needles: A Memoir of Growing Up with Diabetes". She began writing this book after her older sister died of a heart attack, cocaine, and diabetes abuse.

In 2001, Dominick joined the editorial writing staff at the Des Moines Register. Her journalism pieces earned her a nomination for the 2014 Pulitzer Prize in Editorial Writing. She would later win the Pulitzer Prize in 2018 for "examining the damaging consequences for poor Iowa residents of privatizing the state’s administration of Medicaid."

== Personal life ==
Dominick and her husband have three adopted children together.
