= Alex Smith (tight end) =

American football player (born 1982)

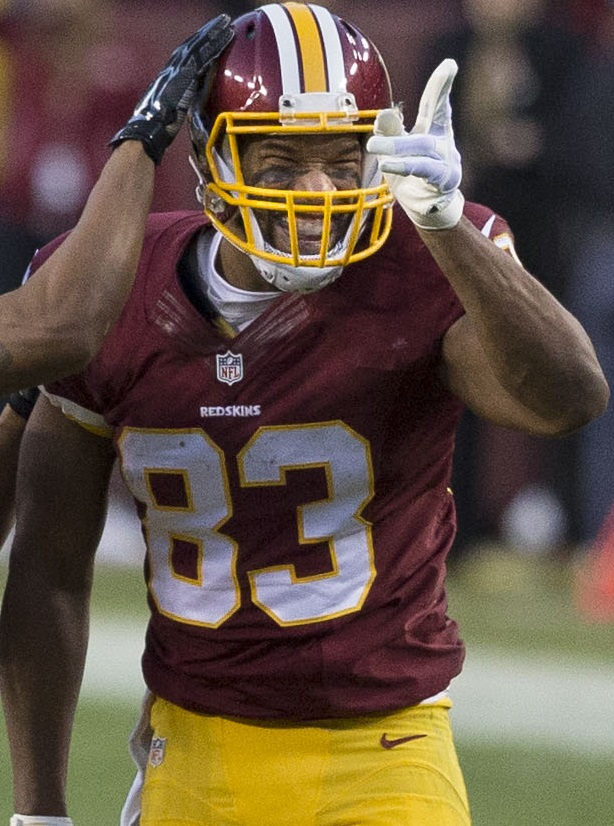
- Smith with the Washington Redskins in 2015

No. 81, 82, 83
- Position: Tight end

Personal information
- Born: May 22, 1982 (age 44); Denver, Colorado, U.S.
- Listed height: 6 ft 4 in (1.93 m)
- Listed weight: 250 lb (113 kg)

Career information
- High school: Mullen (Denver)
- College: Stanford
- NFL draft: 2005: 3rd round, 71st overall pick

Career history

Playing
- Tampa Bay Buccaneers (2005–2008); New England Patriots (2009)*; Philadelphia Eagles (2009); Cleveland Browns (2010–2012); Cincinnati Bengals (2013–2014); New Orleans Saints (2015)*; Washington Redskins (2015)
- * Offseason or practice squad member only

Operations
- Tampa Bay Buccaneers (2017–2021) Pro scout; Tampa Bay Buccaneers (2021–2023) Assistant Director of Pro Scouting

Awards and highlights
- Second-team All-American (2004); First-team All-Pac-10 (2004)

Career NFL statistics
- Receptions: 163
- Receiving yards: 1,473
- Receiving touchdowns: 13
- Stats at Pro Football Reference

Edwin Alexander Smith (born May 22, 1982) is an American former professional football player who was a tight end in the National Football League (NFL). He played college football for the Stanford Cardinal and was selected by the Tampa Bay Buccaneers in the third round of the 2005 NFL draft. Smith was also a member of the New England Patriots, Philadelphia Eagles, Cleveland Browns, and Cincinnati Bengals, New Orleans Saints, and Washington Redskins.

== Early life ==
Smith attended high school at J. K. Mullen High School in Denver, Colorado. As a senior, he was a Super Prep first-team All-American, Prep Star All-Midlands, All-State and All-Centennial League selection. He was a Nominee for the Fred Steinmark Award, which is given to the Colorado Athlete of the Year. He also played basketball and ran track.

== College career ==
Smith played college football at Stanford University. He was a three-year starter and was runner-up to the John Mackey Award, given to the nation's top tight end, in 2004. Some of his honors included 2004 second-team consensus All-American, 2004 Team MVP, 2003 Honorable mention All-Pac-10, 2003 Honorable mention academic All-Pac-10 and 2002 Academic All-Pac-10. He finished his career starting 32 of 44 games, making 107 receptions for 1,291 yards and eight touchdowns.

== Professional career ==
Pre-draft measurables
Height	Weight	Arm length	Hand span	40-yard dash	Bench press
6 ft 4 1/8 in (1.93 m)	258 lb (117 kg)	34 1/8 in (0.87 m)	10 in (0.25 m)	4.88 s	28 reps
All values from NFL Combine/Pro Day

=== Tampa Bay Buccaneers ===
Smith was selected by the Tampa Bay Buccaneers in the third round of the 2005 NFL draft. As a rookie, he started 10 of 16 games and recorded 41 receptions for 367 yards and two touchdowns. In 2006, he started 7 of 14 games and made 35 receptions for 250 and three touchdowns and in 2007 he started all 14 games he played in totaling 385 yards on 32 receptions and three touchdowns. In his last year with the Buccaneers in 2008 he started 12 of 14 games making 21 receptions for 250 yards and three touchdowns.

Smith finished his career with the Buccaneers starting 43 of 58 games, recording 129 receptions for 1,252 yards and 11 touchdowns.

=== New England Patriots ===
On April 30, 2009, Smith was traded to the New England Patriots for a fifth round 2010 NFL draft pick. He was released during final cuts on September 5.

=== Philadelphia Eagles ===
Smith signed with the Philadelphia Eagles on September 8, 2009.

=== Cleveland Browns ===
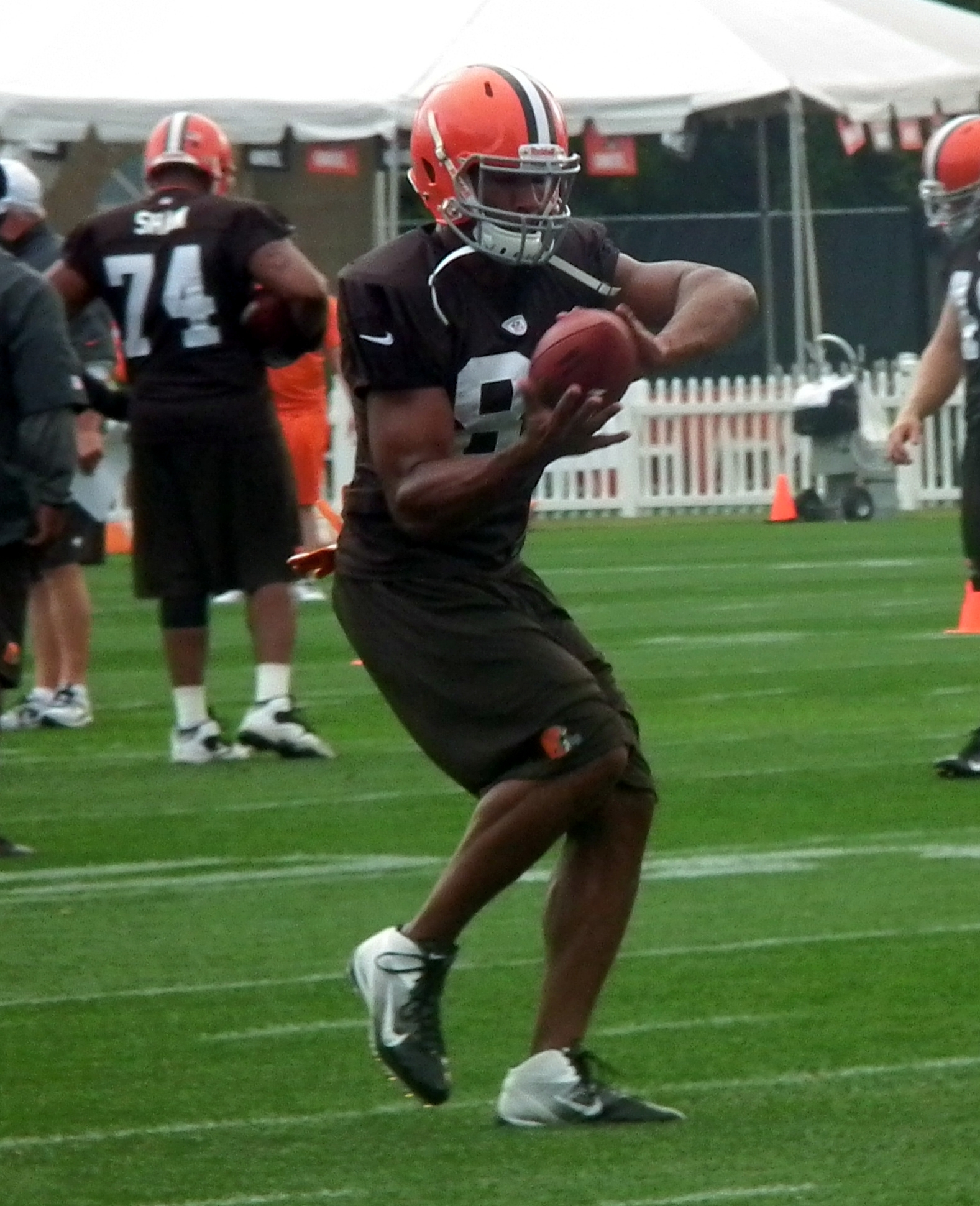
Smith with the Cleveland Browns in 2012

Smith signed a one-year contract with the Cleveland Browns on May 4, 2010. He re-signed with them on March 13, 2012.

=== Cincinnati Bengals ===
On April 16, 2013, Smith signed with the Cincinnati Bengals.

=== New Orleans Saints ===
The New Orleans Saints signed Smith on August 7, 2015. He was waived ten days later.

=== Washington Redskins ===
On December 15, 2015, Smith signed with the Washington Redskins.

== Post-playing career ==
Smith returned to the Tampa Bay Buccaneers as a professional scout in 2017. After seven years with the organization, Smith was fired by the Buccaneers on May 4, 2024.

== Personal life ==
Smith's father, Ed Smith, played defensive end for the Denver Broncos.

Smith married model Angela Gonzalez and they had twin boys Amari and Aiden Smith in 2010 while playing for the Philadelphia Eagles.

Smith won the Madden Bowl in 2006 and 2007 and became the fourth player to win twice.
