= John W. Owens =

John Whitefield Owens (November 2, 1884 – April 24, 1968) was the 1937 Pulitzer Prize winner for editorial writing for his editorials in the Baltimore Sun.
