= Anthony Leviero =

American journalist (1905-1956)

Anthony Harry Leviero
- Born: November 23, 1905; Brooklyn, New York
- Died: September 3, 1956 (aged 50); Pittsfield, Massachusetts
- Resting place: Arlington National Cemetery
- Education: Columbia University; City College of the City University of New York
- Occupation: Journalist
- Spouse: Fay Harrison (m. 1936; d. 1956)
- Children: Toni Harrison Leviero
- Writing career
- Notable awards: Pulitzer Prize for National Reporting; 1952

Anthony Harry Leviero (November 23, 1905 – September 3, 1956) was an American journalist who spent over two decades as a reporter for The New York Times. He won the Pulitzer Prize for National Reporting in 1952.

== Early life and education ==
Anthony Harry Leviero was born in the borough of Brooklyn in New York City, the son of Augustine Faustino Leviero and Thomasina (Lepore) Leviero. He attended Columbia University and City College of the City University of New York.

== Career ==
=== Early career ===
Leviero worked as an auditor for maritime insurance and steamship firms in 1925-6. In 1926 he became a copyboy for the New York American, earning $10 a week. He worked for that newspaper as a night police reporter in the Bronx from 1926 to 1928. In 1928, he became a general assignment reporter for The Bronx Home News at $35 a week.

He was hired by the New York Times in 1929 and worked as a reporter for the newspaper until 1941, when he entered the U.S. Army. His last contribution to the Times before devoting himself full-time to military work was a magazine essay entitled "The Making of a Soldier." "For most of them," he wrote about new Army recruits at Fort McClellan, Alabama, "learning to be a good soldier is accomplished with surprisingly few jolts. All the important adjustments are made within a few weeks. They are learning to fight, these average citizens, and they are also finding their own landmarks."

=== Army ===
In 1941, Leviero was called up for active duty in the Army as a reserve first lieutenant. He served overseas in military intelligence and left the Army in September 1945 as a lieutenant.

=== Washington correspondent ===
Returning to the Times in 1946 as a Washington correspondent, he followed President Truman around the country "on a ski lift, train, airplane, seaplane, tender, destroyer, crash boat, bus, jeep, ferry, and by foot," and wrote many major stories about landmark speeches and actions by Truman, including his 1948 State of the Union address, his introduction of the military draft, his multiple refusals to cut Marshall Plan funds, his June 1948 warning to the Soviets that they had the entire "free world" ranged against them, and his April 1949 assertion that he would not hesitate to use the atomic bomb again if necessary. Leviero was in the White House when two members of the Puerto Rican Nationalist Party tried to assassinate Truman at Blair House. Leviero ran across the street and wrote a report on the attempt. After Truman left the White House and returned to Missouri, Leviero visited him there and profiled him for the Times. "He has slipped back to the soil that nurtured him – which is not to say that he has slipped," wrote Leviero. "[H]is mood is that of a prisoner released. He is carefree yet careful...He is accessible." When Truman turned 70 in May 1954, Leviero visited him again, finding him busy working on his memoirs.

In August 1949, Leviero wrote for the Times Magazine about the presidential press conference, calling it "a great institution" that had become "a factor in our checks-and-balances system of government. Nothing anywhere else in the world compares with it." In a book about Truman's relationship to the news media, Franklin D. Mitchell cited Leviero's article with admiration, stating that no one else had "offered a more thoughtful analysis of the significance of frequent and regular presidential news conferences."

=== J. Edgar Hoover rumor ===
In January 1948, J. Edgar Hoover was apprised of rumors that The American Mercury magazine had commissioned Leviero to write "a highly critical 'smear' article in the nature of a profile" that would accuse Hoover of "perversion." When contacted by an FBI official, Leviero denied the piece would be a "smear." There is no indication that such a piece ever appeared.

== Death ==
Leviero died of a coronary occlusion in Pittsfield, Massachusetts, on September 3, 1956. A military funeral was held at Arlington National Cemetery on September 6. In a memorial article, the editors of the Times praised him for his "objectivity," "dedication," "industry," "unswerving honesty," and "loyalty to his paper." A man of "modest mien and quiet approach," Leviero had managed to extract information from "reluctant sources, or sources not apparent to others," by infusing them "with his zeal to acquire for the public the facts to which it is entitled." President Eisenhower, who had known Leviero during the war, paid tribute to his "high integrity" and "fairness."

== Darnton story ==
On March 15, 2011, Charles McGrath of the Times reported that in a Times article published on October 21, 1942, the death of Times war correspondent Byron Darnton had been described as "accidental," with two later articles stating that he had died on a boat that "was bombed from the air." Omitted from the stories was that the boat was bombed by an American B-25 bomber. On March 9, 1957, Leviero filed an article acknowledging this fact and calling Darnton's death "perhaps the first of a number of tragic incidents during the war in which American aircraft mistakenly attacked our own troops." Times managing editor Edwin L. James, however, "would not print" Leviero's article, wrote McGrath. James later explained to Times publisher Arthur Hays Sulzberger that "The story was not used on the ground it would not do any good." Not until years later was it reported that Darnton had been killed by friendly fire.

== Membership ==
Leviero served for a time as president of the White House Correspondents' Association.

== Honors and awards ==
Leviero was awarded the 1952 Pulitzer Prize for National Reporting. He was recognized for an April 21, 1951, article in which he disclosed "the record of conversations between President Truman and General of the Army Douglas MacArthur at Wake Island in their conference of October, 1950." Truman had reportedly "arranged for a copy of the Wake Conference proceedings to be leaked" to Leviero, because he wanted the public to know that the general "was not the infallible hero he was held up to be." As Leviero reported, "General MacArthur expressed belief that organized resistance would end in the whole Korean peninsula by last Thanksgiving Day." Leviero, however, "denied that the story had been 'planted' with him by a Government source." He said, rather, that he had taken "notes by hand for two hours from the official conference report, which he had obtained by 'asking at the right time.'" After the announcement of the award, Walter Bedell Smith, director of the CIA, wrote a letter of congratulations to Leviero: "If it were not the Wake Island piece, it might have been any one of several others; your by-line is synonymous with Pulitzer prize copy."

== Personal life ==
He married Fay Harrison in 1936. They had a daughter, Toni Harrison Leviero, who married Henry Lyman Parsons Beckwith Jr. in 1965.
