= Doug DeMuro =

American automotive YouTuber, writer and businessman

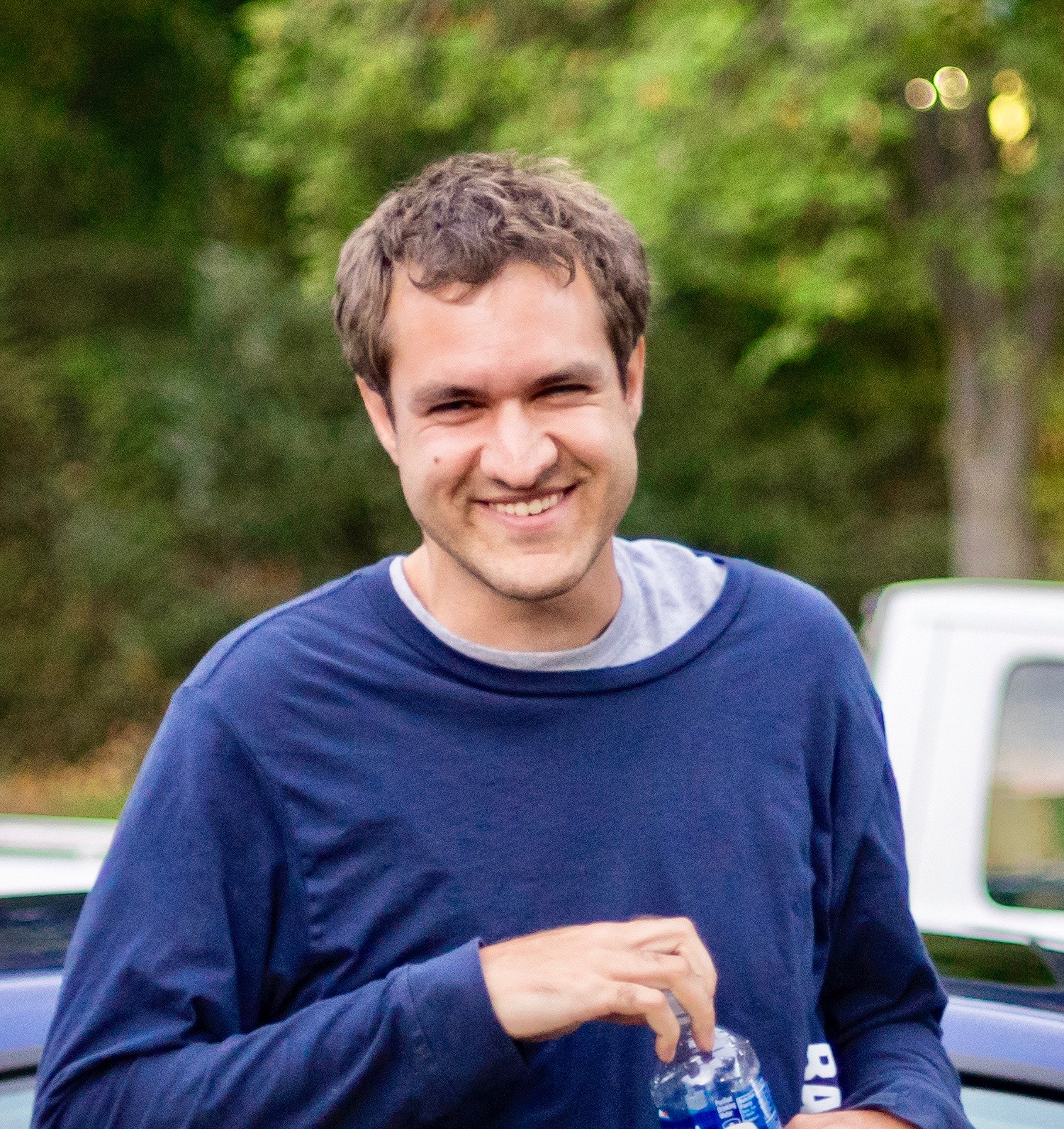
- DeMuro in 2016
- Born: Douglas Andrew DeMuro; May 22, 1988 (age 38); Denver, Colorado, U.S.
- Education: Emory University (BA)
- Occupations: YouTuber; writer; businessman
- Years active: 2012–present
- Children: 3

YouTube information
- Channel: Doug DeMuro
- Years active: 2013–present
- Genre: Automobiles
- Subscribers: 5.1 million
- Views: 2.2 billion
- Last updated: October 15, 2025
- Website: dougdemuro.com

Douglas Andrew DeMuro (born May 22, 1988) is an American YouTuber, author, columnist and entrepreneur. DeMuro's focus is on the automotive industry; his car review-focused YouTube channel has over 5 million subscribers as of April 2026.

In addition to his YouTube endeavors, DeMuro also founded the automobile trading website Cars & Bids, which allows individuals to purchase and sell vehicles in online auctions. He launched the business in 2020 after leaving his previous position as a writer and editor of Autotrader.com car blog Oversteer.

Previously, DeMuro wrote for The Truth About Cars and Jalopnik.

== Early life and education ==
DeMuro was born and raised in Denver, Colorado, to Italian-American parents. He attended George Washington High School in Denver. In 2009, DeMuro was featured in Automobile for his hobby of car spotting. He then went on to study at Emory University in Atlanta, Georgia, obtaining a bachelor's degree in economics, where he met his current wife while he was working as a resident advisor there. In 2024, DeMuro was named winner of Emory's 40 Under 40.

== Career ==
=== Early writing for car blogs ===
DeMuro's first job after college was at Porsche's North American headquarters in Atlanta as a "vehicle allocation manager". In addition to this, he wrote articles on Autotrader.com. In 2013 DeMuro quit his job in order to focus on automotive writing. He wrote articles for three different car blogs: The Truth About Cars between January and September, his own blog called PlaysWithCars throughout 2013, and Jalopnik starting in April. Furthermore, he wrote two books that were published in July 2013, namely Plays With Cars containing personal car stories and the e-book From My Perspective about DeMuro's perspective on things unrelated to cars.

While working for Jalopnik, DeMuro wrote columns, answered letters from readers, shot videos for his YouTube channel, and occasionally reviewed cars. Furthermore, he bought interesting second-hand cars recommended by readers, which he then reviewed and wrote columns about. Among those cars was a 2004 Ferrari 360 Modena DeMuro purchased in January 2014 with a loan. He kept the car for one year.

In the summer of 2014, DeMuro moved from Atlanta to Philadelphia, Pennsylvania. DeMuro started writing again for The Truth About Cars the next year, while still working for Jalopnik. At the recommendation of readers, DeMuro bought a 2007 Aston Martin V8 Vantage in January 2016 with a "bumper-to-bumper" warranty, of which he documented his ownership. Later that year, DeMuro's new book Bumper to Bumper was released. Some of his columns and reviews were published by the Philadelphia Media Network in 2014 and by The Atlanta Journal-Constitution in 2015.

=== Oversteer and YouTube ===
In the summer of 2016, DeMuro moved to the newly created Autotrader.com car blog Oversteer, of which he became the editor. He kept writing articles and columns, but started focusing more on filming and writing car reviews on YouTube. DeMuro has reviewed a wide array of cars on his channel, mainly from the 1970s to the present. Those cars include supercars like the Ford GT, the Bugatti Chiron, and the Ferrari F40; but also new, innovative, and quirky cars including the Tesla Model 3 and the BMW Isetta.

In a typical review, DeMuro first addresses exterior and interior "quirks and features", then drives the car, and concludes with giving the car a score between 10 and 100. That score, which he calls a "DougScore", is based on the scores in ten separate categories related to usability and fun. Most of the cars DeMuro reviews are not press cars, but are owned by dealerships and individuals; for a brief period, he also partnered with the car sharing company Turo, where he would rent cars as he traveled based on a budget given to him by Turo and then review them.

The first car to receive the DougScore was a 2006 third-generation Range Rover that was purchased from CarMax in Marietta, Georgia, in December 2012. The Range Rover was the subject of its own series of videos and articles where DeMuro recounted all of the repairs he had to make to the vehicle over his time owning it, aided by a six-year and 66,000-mile bumper to bumper warranty he purchased for $3,899; by the time the warranty expired, DeMuro's vehicle had received over $21,000 in repair work.

His YouTube channel has amassed 4.98 million subscribers, as of June 2025. DeMuro also started a second channel called More Doug DeMuro in August 2018, which has nearly 750,000 subscribers as of March 2023. It features more opinion-based and vlog-style content, as well as question and answer videos; DeMuro stopped updating the page regularly and combined it with his Cars & Bids channel in 2023.

DeMuro appeared in the Jay Leno's Garage season three episode "Larger Than Life", in which he tried to recognize cars while being blindfolded, in June 2017. He worked with Leno again in March 2019, when he reviewed Leno's McLaren F1.

=== Cars & Bids ===
DeMuro left Autotrader.com to focus on a new venture which eventually grew into the car auction website Cars & Bids, which he had first conceived in 2019. The website is aimed at cars for enthusiasts and formerly only listed cars built in 1981 or later. The first car listed on the site was DeMuro's own 2012 Mercedes-Benz E 63 AMG Wagon; in the years since, he has gone on to sell several more of his vehicles on the site. These vehicles were a 2018 Kia Stinger GT2, which he purchased to replace the E 63 AMG wagon; a 2020 Land Rover Defender, which he bought to replace the Stinger and which was the first car DeMuro bought brand new for himself; a 1994 Audi RS2 Avant, which was imported from Japan via Canada; and a 1998 Mercedes-Benz A140, which was imported in 2023.

The company reported 4,000 listed cars and US$75 million spent by purchasers during 2021. In January 2023, The Chernin Group acquired a majority stake in Cars & Bids for US$37 million. As of May 2, 2025, Cars & Bids expanded their selection to also include vehicles built before 1981.

== Personal life ==
DeMuro currently lives in San Diego, California with his wife Joanna and their three children.

== Bibliography ==
- DeMuro, Doug (2013). Plays With Cars. ASIN B01LVW4FC7.
- DeMuro, Doug (2013). From My Perspective. ASIN B00DXMIZEK.
- DeMuro, Doug (2016). Bumper to Bumper. ISBN 9781365183362.
