= Forrest W. Seymour =

American journalist

Forrest W. Seymour (July 10, 1905 – October 3, 1983) was a Pulitzer Prize–winning journalist for the Des Moines Register and the Worcester Telegram. One of his most notable works is Sitanka: The Full Story of Wounded Knee, an account of the massacre, the events leading up to it and the aftermath.

== Career ==
In 1926, Seymour began working for the Des Moines Register. In 1943, he won the Pulitzer Prize for Editorial Writing.

During the 1950s, Seymour served as co-chair of the National Conference of Christians and Jews for the Des Moines area.

== Personal life ==
Seymour died in Hyannis on October 3, 1983.
