= Edward M. Kingsbury =

Edward Martin Kingsbury (born in Grafton, Massachusetts on July 6, 1854; died 23 January 1946) was a journalist and reviewer who won a Pulitzer Prize for Editorial Writing.

== Life and career ==
He had originally studied law at Harvard Law School and passed the bar in 1878, but never practiced. In 1880 he went to New York City where he would work at The New York Sun from the 1880s to 1910s. At the Sun, Kingsbury would expand journalistic traditions and develop new genres and writings styles, which would influence a number of journalists, including the young H. L. Mencken in Baltimore. In 1915 he joined the editorial department of The New York Times. He won the 1926 Pulitzer Prize for Editorial Writing for "The House of a Hundred Sorrows".
