= Mark Mullaney =

American football player (born 1953)

No. 77
- Position: Defensive end

Personal information
- Born: April 30, 1953 (age 73); Denver, Colorado, U.S.
- Listed height: 6 ft 6 in (1.98 m)
- Listed weight: 242 lb (110 kg)

Career information
- High school: George Washington (Denver, CO)
- College: Colorado State
- NFL draft: 1975: 1st round, 25th overall pick

Career history
- Minnesota Vikings (1975–1987)

Awards and highlights
- Colorado State University Athletic Hall of Fame (2006)

Career NFL statistics
- Games played - started: 151 - 97
- Sacks: 45.5
- Interceptions: 1
- Stats at Pro Football Reference

Mark Alan Mullaney (born April 30, 1953) is an American former professional football player who was a defensive end in the National Football League (NFL). He was selected by the Minnesota Vikings in the first round (25th overall) of the 1975 NFL draft. Mullaney attended Colorado State where he played on both offensive line and defensive line. He played in 12 NFL seasons from 1975 to 1987 for the Vikings and is 14th on the Vikings all-time sack list with 45½ sacks. Mullaney also had 597 tackles and 13 forced fumbles. Mullaney also holds a place in NFL history as the first NFL Player to wear a helmet shield visor on his face mask, after suffering an eye injury in 1984. In 1986 Mullaney switched to a dark tinted shield, the first player to wear this as well. Dennis Ryan, the Vikings long time equipment manager, helped Mullaney create the shield(s).
