= Ed Smith (defensive end) =

American football player (born 1950)

No. 75
- Position: Defensive end

Personal information
- Born: October 23, 1950 (age 76); Nassau, Bahamas
- Listed height: 6 ft 5 in (1.96 m)
- Listed weight: 241 lb (109 kg)

Career information
- High school: George Washington (Denver, Colorado, U.S.)
- College: Colorado College
- NFL draft: 1973: 13th round, 319th overall pick

Career history
- Denver Broncos (1973–1974)

Career NFL statistics
- Sacks: 1
- Fumble recoveries: 1
- Interceptions: 1
- Stats at Pro Football Reference

Edwin Alexander Smith (born October 23, 1950) is a former American football defensive end who played in the National Football League (NFL) for the Denver Broncos. He is better known for being the first player born in the Bahamas to be drafted in the NFL. He played college football for Colorado College.

== Early life ==
Smith attended St. Augustine's College in the Bahamas, where he practiced basketball and track. He started playing American football as a junior at George Washington High School (Denver, Colorado). He was a three-year starter at defensive end and a Kodak All-American at Colorado College, where he also practiced rugby.

In 2009, he was inducted into the Bahamas National Sports Hall of Fame.

== Professional career ==
Smith was selected in the 13th round (319th overall) of the 1973 NFL draft by the Denver Broncos. He became the first player in league history from the Bahamas to be drafted.

As a rookie, he was a raw player and needed to add more weight, so he played in only 5 games and spent most of the season on the inactive list. The next year, he started in 3 games. In 1975, he was placed on the injured reserve list with a career-ending neck injury, missing all of the season. He retired before the start of the 1977 season.

== Personal life ==
His son Alex also played in the National Football League.
