= Bob Sipchen =

American journalist

Robert Sipchen
- Born: June 13, 1953 (age 73); Chicago, Illinois
- Education: University of California, Santa Barbara (B.A. 1976)
- Occupation: Writer
- Spouse: Pamela Jean Sipchen
- Children: 3
- Writing career
- Language: English
- Years active: 1980–
- Period: 1980–
- Notable work: Los Angeles Times
- Notable awards: Pulitzer Prize for Editorial Writing (2002); Pulitzer Prize for Spot News Reporting (staff, 1993)

Bob Sipchen (born June 13, 1953) is an American journalist, author, educator, and communications professional. He is currently a Senior Editor at the Los Angeles Times and an adjunct professor in the Department of Writing and Rhetoric at Occidental College in Los Angeles. He previously served as Communications Director of the Sierra Club and as Editor-in-Chief of Sierra magazine. He has been part of teams at the Los Angeles Times that have won three Pulitzer Prizes.

== Early life and education ==
Sipchen was born in Chicago. He paid his way through college as an interagency hotshot crew firefighter and patrolman with the U.S. Forest Service. He graduated with a B.A. in 1976 from the University of California, Santa Barbara, which granted him the school's Distinguished Alumni Award in 2006.

== Career at the Los Angeles Times ==
His career at the Times has included serving as editor of the Sunday Opinion section and senior editor of the Los Angeles Times Magazine. He led the team of journalists that created the newspaper's popular Outdoors section in print and on the web.

As a reporter, Sipchen covered the 1992 Los Angeles riots that erupted in Los Angeles following the trial of police officers involved in the beating of motorist Rodney King and shared in the newspaper's Pulitzer Prize for Spot News Reporting in 1993 for that reportage. Sipchen published the first profile of Reginald Denny, the motorist whose nationally televised attack became an icon of the inchoate rage vented during the riots.

When he was Associate Editor of the Los Angeles Times editorial pages, he and colleague Alex Raksin won the annual Pulitzer Prize for Editorial Writing in 2002. The Pulitzer committee cited "their comprehensive and powerfully written editorials exploring the issues and dilemmas provoked by mentally ill people dwelling on the streets."

Sipchen also wrote about cultural issues, politics, covered a presidential campaign, and wrote a column for the Times about the magazine industry. In 1997, Sipchen loaded his wife and three children into a 26-foot motorhome and drove 22,000 miles through 46 states, including Alaska, writing twice-a-week columns about the state of the American family. In 2003, he wrote a personal essay about watching Southern California's devastating wildfires destroy his childhood home. In 2006 he created the "School Me" column and multimedia "School Me!" blog which explored education issues.

He worked as an editor on the team that won the 2016 Pulitzer Prize for Breaking News for coverage of the 2015 terrorist attack in San Bernardino, California.

== Sierra Club ==
Sipchen left the Los Angeles Times in 2007 to edit the 110-year-old Sierra magazine. In 2009 he was promoted to Communications Director for the organization, overseeing a national staff of more than 60 multimedia professionals responsible for the club's messaging, branding, advocacy journalism, social media communications, press relations and public affairs.

== Teaching ==
An adjunct professor at Occidental College in Los Angeles since 1997, Sipchen teaches news writing and a communications class, "Rhetorical Fault Lines," in the fall and narrative non-fiction in the spring, using a team teaching approach that has included as many as eight Pulitzer Prize–winning journalists in a calendar year.

Sipchen served on the advisory committee of the Hechinger Institute on Education and the Media, based at Teachers College, Columbia University.

== Published works ==
Besides his newspaper articles and columns, Sipchen has written for many national magazines. He has written one published book, Baby Insane and the Buddha (Doubleday, 1992, ISBN 978-0-385-41997-0), a nonfiction account of gang violence in southern California. A New York Times book review called it "... first rate ... Sipchen's supple, muscular prose gives the book the sweep and narrative pacing of a novel."
