= Rick Attig =

American journalist and fiction writer

- Born: Corvallis, Oregon, U.S.
- Education: University of Oregon (BA, Journalism and Political Science, 1983); Pacific University (MFA, Fiction, 2010)
- Occupations: Journalist; Author
- Employer: The Oregonian (1998–2012)
- Notable work: Editorials on U.S. Immigration and Naturalization Service abuses; Mental health reporting on Oregon State Hospital
- Spouse: Courtenay Thompson
- Children: 2 (Mitchell and Will)
- Awards: Pulitzer Prize for Public Service (2001); Pulitzer Prize for Editorial Writing (2006); National Headliner Award (2006)
- Honors: Inducted into the University of Oregon School of Journalism and Communication Hall of Achievement (2015)

Rick Attig is an American journalist and author, formerly a member of the editorial board for The Oregonian newspaper in Portland, Oregon. He was a 2008 Knight Fellow at Stanford University and twice shared the Pulitzer Prize.

Attig was born and raised in Corvallis, Oregon. He earned his bachelor's degree in journalism and political science in 1983 from the University of Oregon. Before he graduated, he was working as a reporter for the now-defunct Springfield News in Springfield, Oregon. In 1984 he joined The Bulletin daily newspaper in Bend, Oregon where he held a number of positions including senior writer, editorial page editor, and, beginning in 1995, executive editor. From 1998 to 2012, he was associate editor and member of the editorial board for The Oregonian in Portland. He has been recognized in his field with over 40 national, state, and regional awards. Attig was part of a group of Oregonian writers that won the 2001 Pulitzer Prize for Public Service for a series of articles and editorials about abuses in the U.S. Immigration and Naturalization Service. In 2006, he shared with his friend and colleague Doug Bates the Pulitzer Prize for Editorial Writing, as well as the National Headliners 1st Place Award, and he was a finalist for the American Society of Newspaper Editors Distinguished Writing Award for his editorial writing about abuse of the mentally ill at the Oregon State Hospital.

In October 2015, Attig was inducted in the University of Oregon School of Journalism and Communication's Hall of Achievement.

Attig earned a MFA in fiction in 2010 from Pacific University. His short stories have appeared in several anthologies and literary magazines. His wife, Courtenay Thompson, is also a writer and editor. Attig has two sons, Mitchell, 33, who works in environmental restoration in Portland, and Will, 20, a student at the University of Notre Dame and a member of the Irish fencing team.
