= Bill Stall =

American journalist

William R. Stall (February 21, 1937 – November 2, 2008) was a reporter and staff member of the Los Angeles Times who was awarded the Pulitzer Prize in 2004.

== Biography ==
Stall was born on February 21, 1937, in Philadelphia to parents Sidney J. and Helen R. Stall. He and his two siblings moved with his parents in 1942 to Big Horn, Wyoming, to operate a small ranch. Stall's father worked part-time at the Sheridan Press, later owning a weekly newspaper.

Stall majored in journalism at the University of Wyoming and was sports editor, and later covered city-county government, for Laramie Daily Bulletin while still in college. He also attended Northwestern University and Johns Hopkins University, and served in the National Guard. He was hired by the Associated Press in Cheyenne, Wyoming, later working as the AP's Reno correspondent before a move to the agency's Sacramento, California, bureau, where he was bureau chief from 1966 to 1974.

He served in the administration of Governor Jerry Brown as press secretary and director of public affairs in 1975 and 1976. He was hired in 1976 by The Los Angeles Times reporting in the Metro section. He later covered energy policy and was assistant Metro editor before becoming a staff writer in the paper's Washington, D.C., bureau. He took a position as Washington bureau chief for the Hartford Courant.

In 1980, he shared the Gerald Loeb Award for Large Newspapers for his coverage of the U.S. energy crisis.

Stall was awarded the 2004 Pulitzer Prize for Editorial Writing for a series of editorials written in October, November and December 2003 on California's troubled state government. The Reinventing California editorials included "How the Engine Derailed", "Primed for Fiscal Overhaul", "Yank the 'For Sale' Sign", "A Legislature at War" and concluded with "Seize the Political Moment". The Pulitzer board noted that Stall's series of editorials "prescribed remedies and served as a model for addressing complex state issues."

Stall was also proud of a 2001 series of editorials he wrote supporting Senate Bill 221, a measure submitted by State Senator Sheila Kuehl that would require real estate developers of projects with 500 or more units to demonstrate that the homes would have access to a long-term water supply. A lobbyist for the East Bay Municipal Utility District said that Stall's editorials helped make the case for the legislation, overcoming opposition from the building industry. After ten years of unsuccessful efforts to pass such a bill, the proposal passed in the legislature and was signed into law by Governor Gray Davis, making California the first state in the Western United States to enact such a law.

Stall died of complications from pulmonary disease on November 2, 2008, at his home in Sacramento, California. He had been in failing health much of the year.
