= Don Ultang =

American photographer

Donald Theodore Ultang (March 23, 1917 – September 18, 2008) was an American photographer, a pioneer in aerial photography and a Pulitzer Prize winner.

== Biography ==
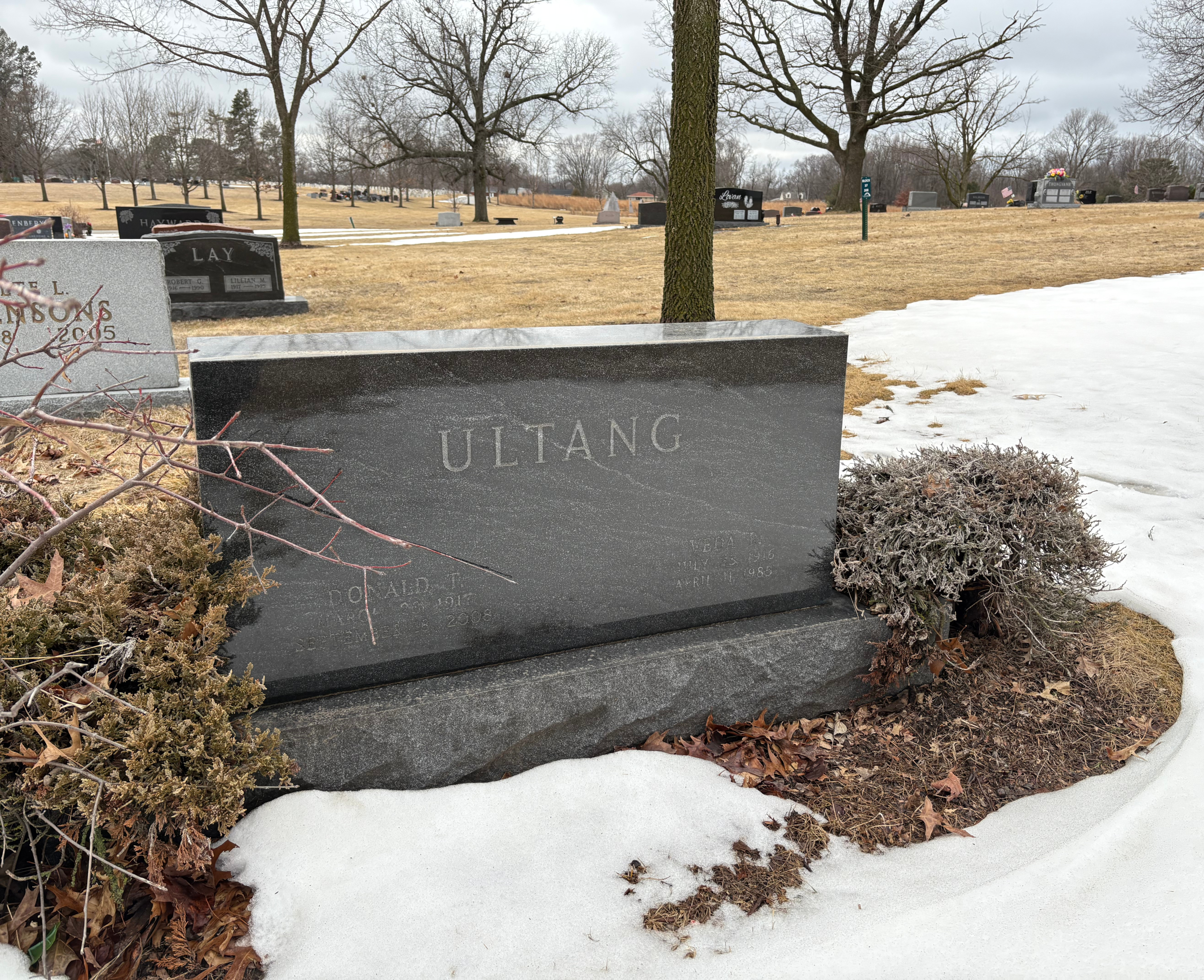
Ultang's grave at Glendale Cemetery

Ultang was born in Fort Dodge, Iowa and raised in Cedar Rapids. He attended the University of Iowa, earning a degree in economics in 1939. Shortly after his graduation from college, he was hired by The Des Moines Register. After being hired by The Register, he signed up to participate in a government-funded pilot training program and served in the United States Navy during World War II as a flight instructor.

After returning to civilian life, he convinced the Register to purchase a Beechcraft Bonanza to be used for aerial photography. As the paper's only pilot, he would use the plane to take panoramic photos of news events such as a train wreck or flood from the plane using his Speed Graphic camera. Ultang would fly the plane solo over the target at a few hundred above the ground, keep his plane in a 45 to 50 degree banking turn and about 20 miles per hour above stall speed, briefly release one of his hands from the controls for about five seconds to take the desired sequence of photographs, and retake the controls to circle around for another series of shots.

A portfolio of Ultang's photographs was printed in U.S. Camera, 1954 together with works by Ansel Adams, in an annual work published by Duell, Sloan and Pearce. In 1991, the Iowa State University Press published a book of his work, "Holding the Moment: Mid-America at Mid-Century." Ultang retired after 20 years at the Register and took a job at an insurance company. In recognition of his pioneering career, Ultang was inducted by the Iowa Aviation Hall of Fame in 1991.

After Ultang retired, and spent his winters in New Mexico, he began a second career taking nature and landscape photographs until a few years before his death. Ultang died in his sleep on September 18, 2008, aged 91. He was buried at Glendale Cemetery in Des Moines.

== Career ==
=== Johnny Bright incident ===
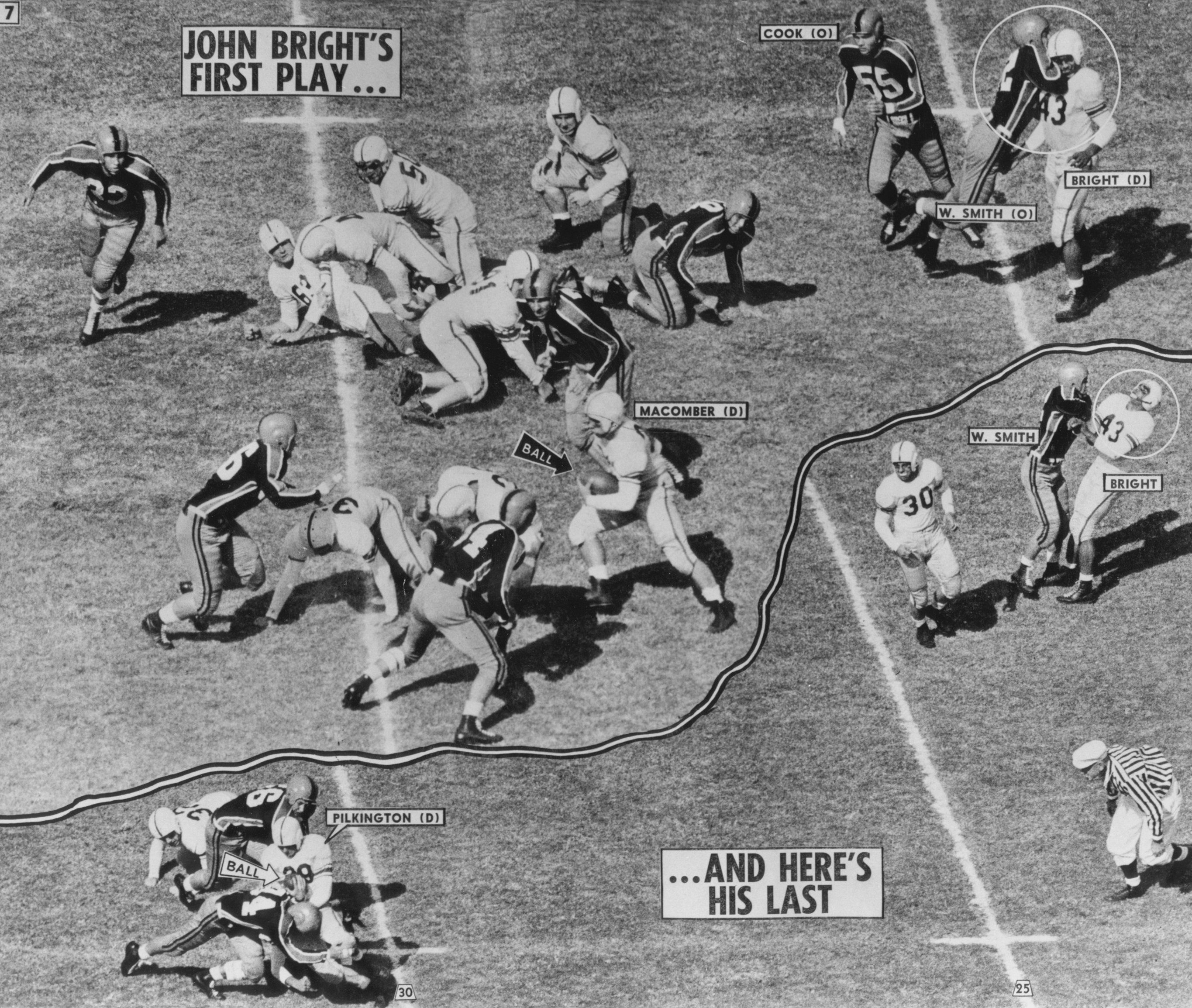
Ultang's Pulitzer Prize-winning photos of the Johnny Bright incident

In 1952 the Des Moines Register photographers Ultang and John Robinson won the 1952 Pulitzer Prize for Photography. The prize recognized a series of pictures showing a violent on-field assault against an African American player during a college football game: October 20, 1951, in Stillwater, Oklahoma, between host Oklahoma A&M (now Oklahoma State University Cowboys) and visiting Drake University Bulldogs. A&M's white Wilbanks Smith repeatedly placed hard hits on Drake's black Johnny Bright, breaking his jaw, in an incident caught in a series of images that earned national attention when they appeared on the front page of The Register. The pictures showed that Smith's hits on Bright happened when Bright was well out of the play. The event came to be known as the "Johnny Bright incident". Despite Ultang and Robinson's irrefutable evidence of the hits, Oklahoma State did not formally apologize for the incident until 2005.

Ultang was one of 18 recipients of the 1952 National Headliner Awards ceremonies held in Atlantic City, New Jersey, winning in the "Sports action picture" category, together with Robinson, for their photographs of the "Johnny Bright Slugging". Years later, Ultang said he and Robinson were very lucky to capture the incident when they did. They had heard rumors that Bright was going to be targeted, and had set up a camera on Bright before the game. However, they knew they had to leave after the first quarter so they could develop the film for the next day's edition. "If all this had happened in the second quarter," Ultang said, "we wouldn’t have even been there."
