= Ron Casey (editor) =

American journalist (1951–2000)

Ronald Bruce Casey (August 21, 1951 – February 21, 2000) was a Pulitzer Prize-winning editorial writer and editorial page editor for The Birmingham News.

Casey was born in Midfield, Alabama, United States in 1951. He graduated from Jones Valley High School and from the University of Alabama before joining the reporting staff at the Birmingham News in 1973. He was promoted to the editorial board in 1979, the same year he married his wife, Margaret. Ten years later, he became the editorial page editor.

In 1991, Casey, along with Harold Jackson and Joey Kennedy, won the Pulitzer Prize for Editorial Writing for their series, "What They Won't Tell You About Your Taxes", analyzing inequities in Alabama's tax system and proposing needed reforms. He was a finalist for the National Headliners Award in 1992. In 1994 he was nominated for a second Pulitzer as well as for the National Education Writers Award.
