= The San Juan Daily Star =

Puerto Rican newspaper

- Type: Daily newspaper
- Format: Tabloid
- Owner(s): Ricardo Angulo
- President: Ricardo Angulo
- Founded: 1959
- Language: English
- Relaunched: 2009
- Website: sanjuandailystar.com

The San Juan Daily Star, originally The San Juan Star, is the only English and Spanish newspaper in Puerto Rico. The Pulitzer Prize-winning newspaper was published by Star Media Network, a subdivision of San Juan Star, Inc.

== History ==
=== San Juan Star ===
The newspaper was founded in 1959 by William J. Dorvillier, and was intended for the English-speaking population in Puerto Rico. Pulitzer Prize-winning novelist William Kennedy was once the managing editor of the Star, soon after its inception to 1961. Other contributors included Eddie López and Juan Manuel García Passalacqua. Scott Ware served as managing editor from 1991 to 1992, then editor until 1994. The paper was sold in 1996 from then owner Scripps-Howard to Gerardo Angulo, a prominent Cuban businessman and venture capitalist who had formerly worked with money manager Ivan Boesky.

The paper was shut down in August 2008, in what its staff contended was a union busting operation.

=== Relaunch ===
In 2009, The San Juan Star relaunched, renamed The San Juan Daily Star, having increased to daily publication: Monday through Thursday with an additional weekend edition. On October 23, 2015, Gerardo Angulo died in an automobile accident during a business trip to the Dominican Republic. The newspaper continues to operate under the ownership of the Angulo family.

== See also ==
- List of newspapers in Puerto Rico
