= Harold Jackson (American journalist) =

American journalist

- Education: Baker University
- Occupation: Journalist
- Awards: Pulitzer Prize for Editorial Writing (1991)

Harold Jackson is an American journalist who won a Pulitzer Prize. In 2010, he was editor of the editorial page of The Philadelphia Inquirer. He was formerly an editorial writer at The Baltimore Sun and The Birmingham News (Alabama).

== Early life and education ==
Jackson grew up in Birmingham, Alabama. He obtained his degree in journalism and political science from Baker University in 1975.

== Career ==
Jackson was the coordinator of The Inquirer's daily commentary and Sunday Voices pages. In 2004 he became deputy editor of the editorial page. He also worked at United Press International and the Birmingham Post-Herald.

== Awards and honors ==
With two Birmingham News colleagues, Ron Casey and Joey Kennedy, Jackson won the annual Pulitzer Prize for Editorial Writing in 1991, citing "their editorial campaign analyzing inequities in Alabama's tax system and proposing needed reforms."
