= William Wesley Waymack =

American newspaper editor and atomic energy commissioner (1888–1960)

Member of the United States Atomic Energy Commission
- In office November 5, 1946 – December 21, 1948
- President: Harry S. Truman

Personal details
- Born: October 18, 1888 Savanna, Illinois, U.S.
- Died: November 5, 1960 (aged 72) Des Moines, Iowa, U.S.
- Party: Republican
- Education: Morningside College
- Occupation: Newspaper editor
- Awards: Pulitzer Prize for Editorial Writing (1938)

William Wesley Waymack (October 18, 1888 – November 5, 1960) was an American newspaper editor and public official. He spent most of his career at the Des Moines Register and Tribune, where he received the 1938 Pulitzer Prize for Editorial Writing, and was one of the five original members of the United States Atomic Energy Commission from 1946 to 1948.

== Early life and journalism ==
Waymack was born in Savanna, Illinois, to William Edward and Emma Julia (Oberheim) Waymack, and graduated from high school in Mount Carroll, Illinois in 1904. He graduated from Morningside College in Sioux City, Iowa, in 1911 and married Elsie Jeannette Lord the same year; their son, Edward Randolph, was born in 1912.

After working his way up at the Sioux City Journal, where he was chief editorial writer from 1914, Waymack joined the Des Moines Register and Tribune in 1918. He was managing editor from 1921 to 1929, returned in 1931 as editor of the editorial pages after a period of poor health, and became a vice president of the company in 1939, editor of the combined newspapers in 1943, and a director of its broadcasting affiliate in 1944.

He received the Pulitzer Prize for Editorial Writing in 1938, awarded for his editorial work of the preceding year, and was also given the Sigma Delta Chi distinguished service award in 1940 and an American Farm Bureau award in 1944. His editorials pressed for a better economic balance between the industrial Northeast and the agricultural Midwest, for reciprocal trade as a remedy for low farm prices, and against American isolationism. A Republican, he accepted the need for New Deal farm programs while criticizing his own party's agricultural platforms. He served on the President's Committee on Farm Tenancy in 1936–1937, chaired the Economic Policy Committee from 1938 to 1941, and sat on the board of the Federal Reserve Bank of Chicago from 1941, as its deputy chairman from 1942.

== Atomic Energy Commission ==
Late in October 1946 President Harry S. Truman selected Waymack and the physicist Robert Bacher from a list submitted by David E. Lilienthal, completing the first Atomic Energy Commission. Waymack had been a prominent backer of the National Committee for Civilian Control of Atomic Energy and had taken no part in the legislative fight over the McMahon bill. The appointments were announced on October 28; Waymack gave up his newspaper and broadcasting positions and took office on November 5, 1946, later than his colleagues because of unfinished business at the Chicago Federal Reserve Bank. The only member with a journalistic background, he was among the commission's more frequent public speakers in its first year, and resigned on December 21, 1948, in poor health. He published an assessment of how the Atomic Energy Act had worked in practice in 1951.

== Later life ==
Waymack retired to his farm at Adel, Iowa, but continued to serve on national bodies, among them the national committee of the American Civil Liberties Union from 1951 and the American Council for NATO from 1954. He was appointed to the Order of the British Empire for his work on the Midwest selection committee for Marshall Scholarships between 1953 and 1958. He died of an abdominal hemorrhage at Iowa Methodist Hospital in Des Moines on November 5, 1960, and was buried at Oakdale Cemetery in Adel. His papers, covering 1927 to 1961, are held by the State Historical Society of Iowa in Iowa City as collection Ms 128.
