= Rochelle Sharpe =

American journalist

Rochelle Sharpe is an American journalist. She won a 1991 Pulitzer Prize for National Reporting. Her work has appeared in the New York Times, NPR, and Politico. She was an adjunct professor at Boston University.
