= Joey Kennedy =

Joey Kennedy (born Joe David Kennedy Jr.) is an American journalist who lives in Birmingham, Alabama.

== Early life and career ==
Kennedy was born in southeastern Texas and grew up in southern Louisiana. He later moved to Alabama. He came to The Birmingham News as a sports copy editor in 1981 and also worked as an assistant lifestyle editor, the newspaper's first photo editor, as Sunday editor, editor of the newspaper's television section, and as a book editor before joining the editorial board as an editorial writer and columnist in 1989.

He left Alabama Media Group in February 2015 and is currently a back-page columnist for B-Metro magazine and a political columnist for Alabama Political Reporter. Kennedy also teaches English at the University of Alabama at Birmingham, where he was awarded the Walt Mayfield Adjunct Teaching Award in 2018 and the Most Distinguished Teacher for the University Honors Program in 2020.

In 1991, Kennedy and colleagues Ron Casey and Harold Jackson were awarded the Pulitzer Prize for Editorial Writing for the series, "What They Won't Tell You About Your Taxes." Kennedy and The News editorial board were finalists for Pulitzer Prizes in 1994 and 2006 as well. He has been named the state's top editorial page columnist five times. Kennedy's creative nonfiction has been published nationally in Redbook magazine and literary journals.
