= Fred L. Packer =

American cartoonist

Frederick Little Packer (January 4, 1886 – December 8, 1956) was an American illustrator and political cartoonist. Born in Los Angeles, he was educated at the Los Angeles School of Art and Design and the Chicago Art Institute. He worked for the Los Angeles Examiner, San Francisco Call, and from 1919 to 1931 worked as a commercial artist in New York. He returned to newspaper work on the New York Journal in 1932, and in 1933 joined the Daily Mirror. He received the Pulitzer Prize for Editorial Cartooning in 1952.

== Gallery ==
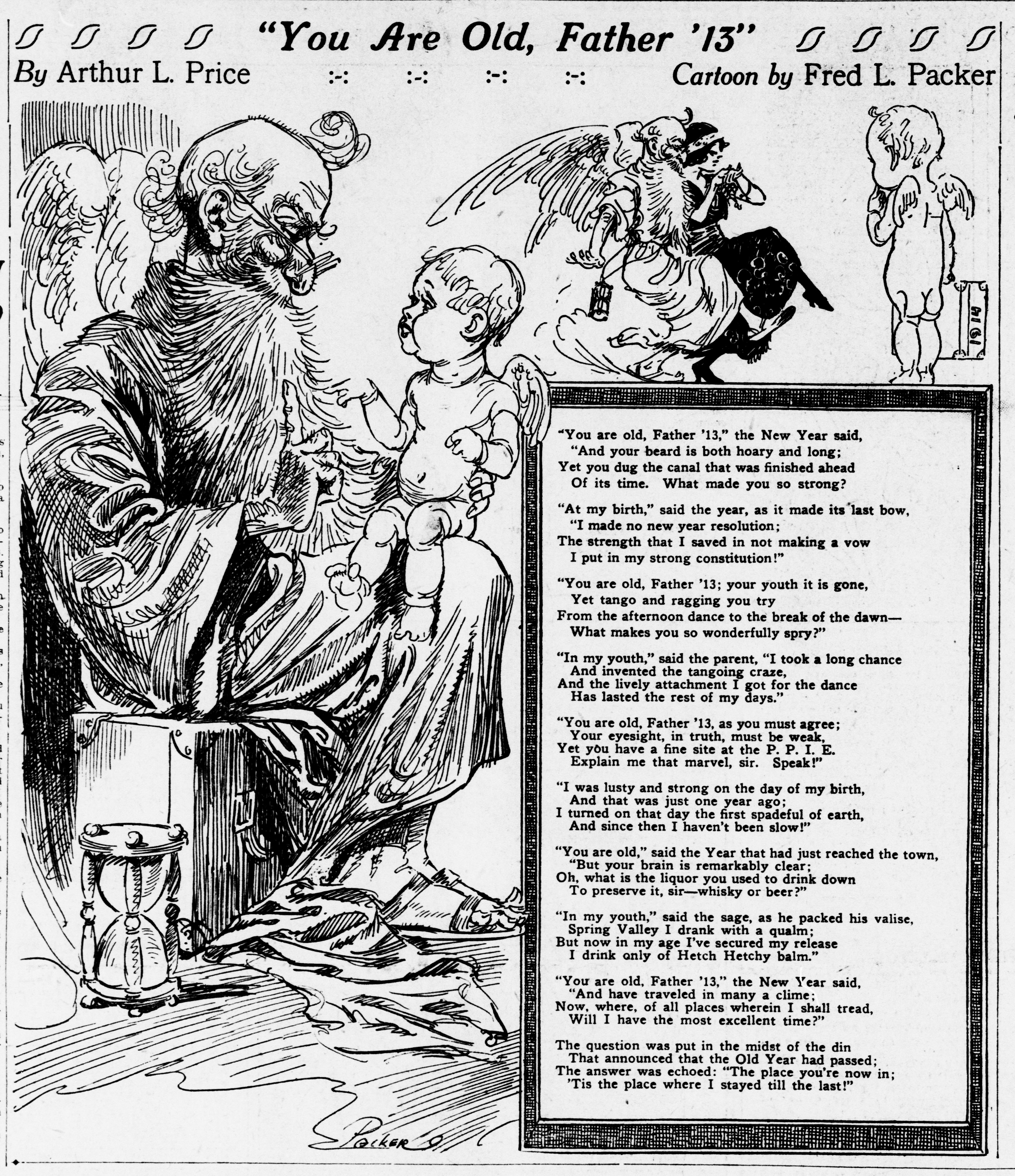
You Are Old, Father '13, written by Arthur L. Price, illustrated by Packer

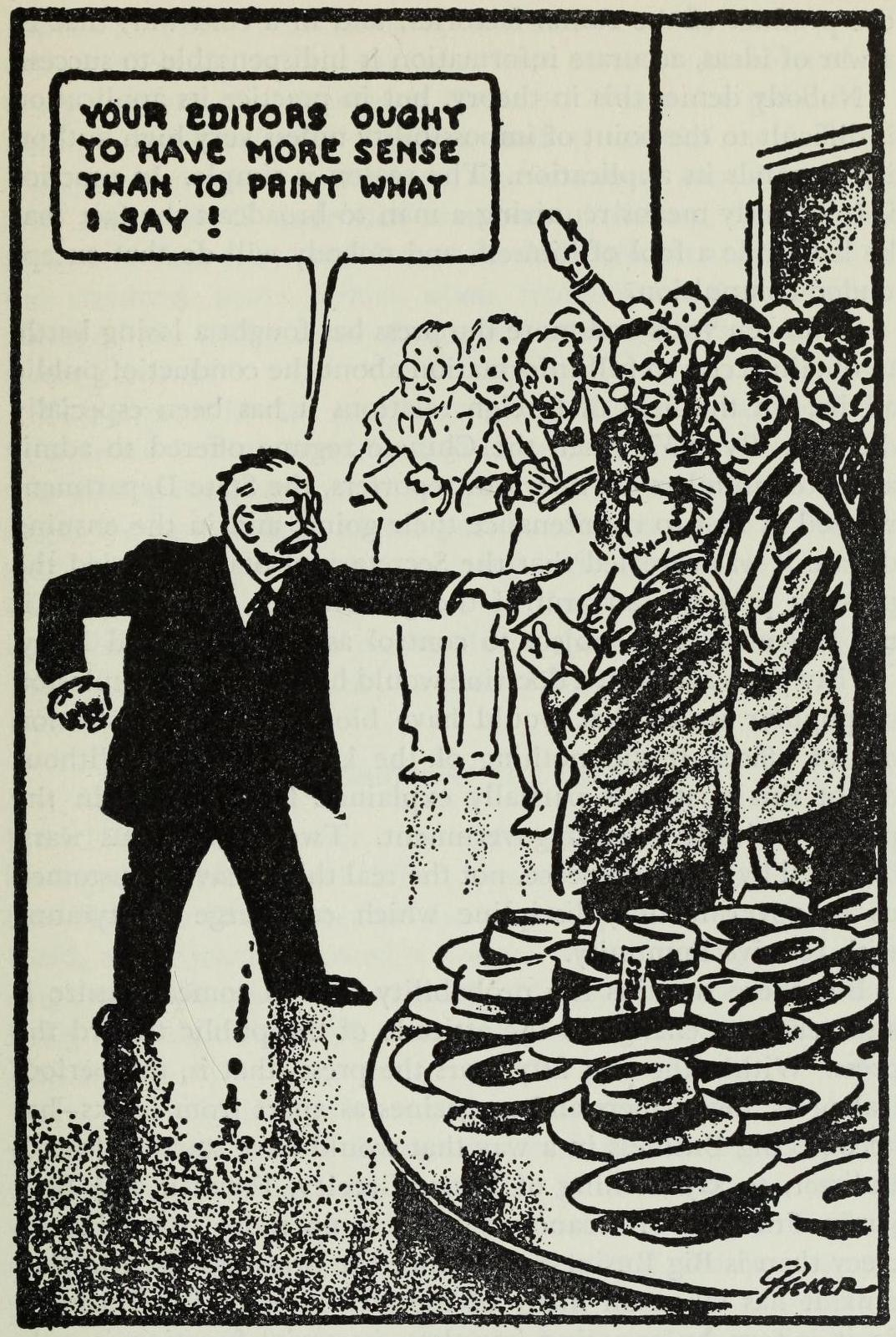
The cartoon for which Packer received the 1952 Pulitzer Prize
