= Louis LaCoss =

American journalist (1890–1966)

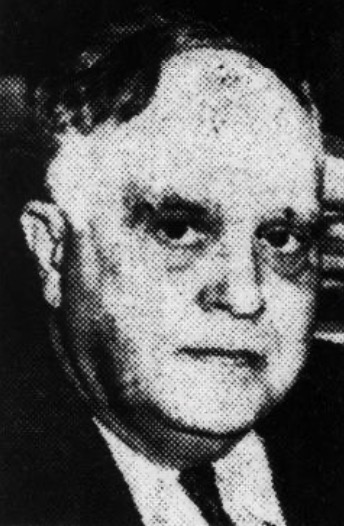
- LaCoss in a 1952 publication of The Washington Star
- Born: January 8, 1890; Erie, Pennsylvania, U.S.
- Died: February 17, 1966 (aged 76); St. Louis, Missouri, U.S.
- Education: University of Kansas
- Occupation: Journalist
- Years active: 1912–1958

Louis LaCoss (January 8, 1890 – February 17, 1966) was an American journalist. In 1952, he was awarded the Pulitzer Prize for Editorial Writing for his editorial "The Low Estate of Public Morals".

== Biography ==
LaCoss was born on January 8, 1890, in Erie, Pennsylvania. He grew up in Kansas and attended the University of Kansas, where he wrote for The University Daily Kansan, his first experience as a journalist.

LaCoss graduated in 1912, and in the same year, he joined the staff of The San Diego Sun after ending up in California during a family vacation. He wrote for The Kansas City Star in 1913, after returning to Kansas, then in 1914, joined the Parsons Sun. From 1915 to 1923, he was a member of the Associated Press, living in Mexico in the latter three years as a correspondent. He was later offered a job in South America, but he instead decided to resign from the AP. He joined the St. Louis Globe-Democrat, the paper for which he would be best known.

With the St. Louis Globe-Democrat, LaCoss worked as a travelling reporter between 1924 and 1936, covering political conventions. Beginning in 1936, he was an editorialist. He wrote the editorial "Low Estate of Public Morals" for the newspaper, which won the 1952 Pulitzer Prize for Editorial Writing. In it, he correlated a cheating scandal at the United States Military Academy to general morality of the society. It received many requests for reprint. He became one of the papers' vice-presidents in 1952, then retired in 1958. Besides journalism, he was a trustee of the University of Kansas.

LaCoss had a son. He died on February 17, 1966, aged 76, in St. Louis, of heart disease. He is buried in Lawrence, Kansas.
