= John D. Maurice =

American journalist

John D. Maurice is an American journalist. He won the 1975 Pulitzer Prize for Editorial Writing for his editorials about the Kanawha County schoolbook controversy.

Maurice worked as a reporter in Huntington, West Virginia, prior to joining the Daily Mail of Charleston, West Virginia, in 1938.
