= Lisa Falkenberg =

American journalist

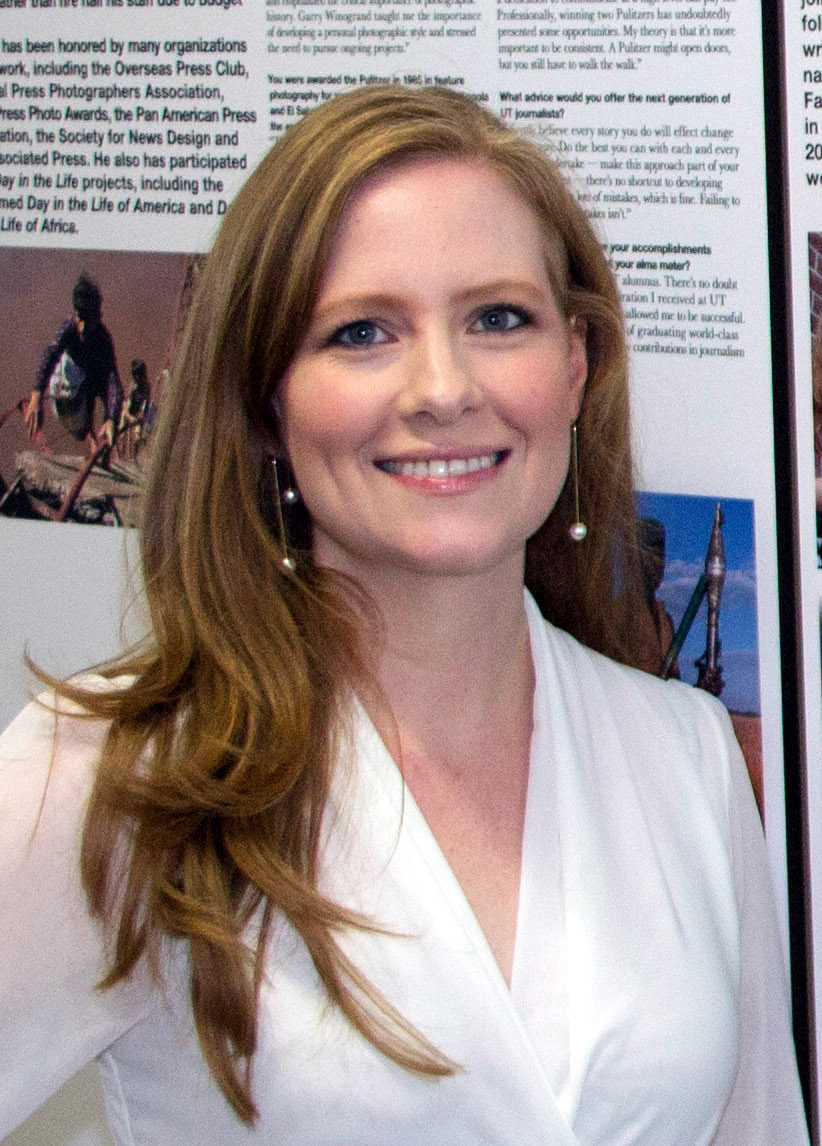
- Lisa Falkenberg, 2015
- Born: Lisa Dawn Falkenberg; July 12, 1978 (age 48); Seguin, Texas, U.S.
- Education: University of Texas at Austin
- Years active: 2001–present
- Known for: Pulitzer Prize-winning journalist
- Children: 2
- Parents: Carl Leroy Falkenberg (father); Connie Sue Koehler (mother)

Lisa Dawn Falkenberg (born July 12, 1978) is an American journalist. She is the Houston Chronicle vice president/editor of opinion.

== Early life and education ==
Falkenberg was born on July 12, 1978, and raised in Seguin, Texas.

She began her career as a journalist writing for her high school newspaper. She attended the University of Texas at Austin and was awarded a degree in journalism in 2000.

== Journalism career ==
For the next four years, Falkenberg worked for the Associated Press. In 2004, she was named the Texas AP writer of the year. The following year, she became a state correspondent for the Houston Chronicle. She became a columnist for that paper in 2007.

In 2022, She shared the prize for Editorial Writing with Michael Lindenberger, Joe Holley and Luis Carrasco

In 2014, Falkenberg's editor nominated her for the Pulitzer Prize for commentary. She was one of two finalists, but did not win. The following year, she won the Pulitzer Prize for commentary, for a series of columns she had written about corrupt grand jury practices in Texas. The Pulitzer announcement noted that her win stemmed from "vividly-written, groundbreaking columns about grand jury abuses that led to a wrongful conviction and other egregious problems in the legal and immigration systems."
