= List of Pulitzer Prizes awarded to The New York Times =

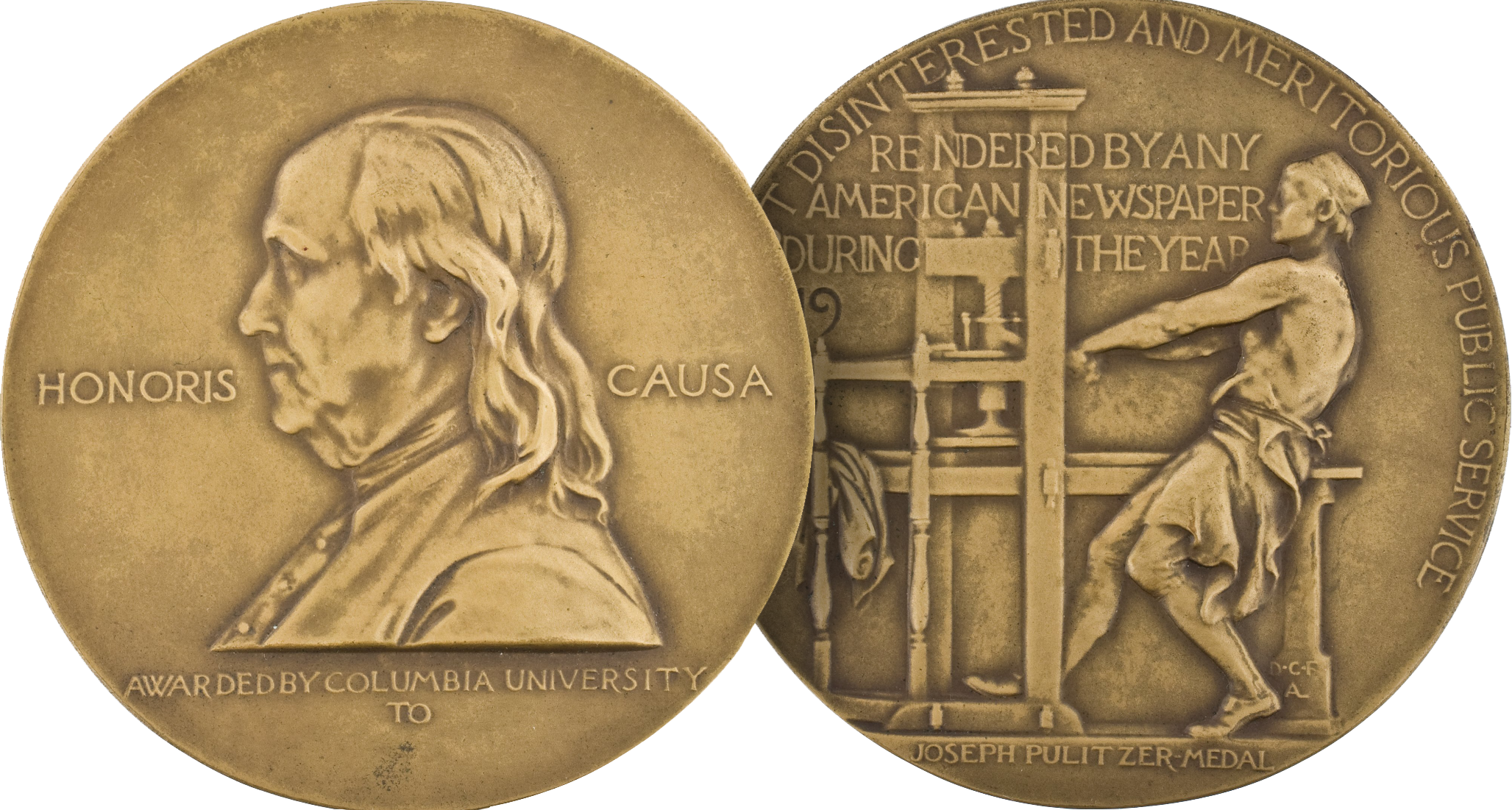
The medal for the Pulitzer Prize for Public Service; staff members at The New York Times have won the Pulitzer for Public Service on six occasions.

The New York Times has won 135 Pulitzer Prizes. It won its first award in 1918, and has since won more Pulitzer prizes than any other organization.

The Pulitzer Prize is a prize awarded within the United States for excellence in journalism in a range of categories. First awarded in 1917, prizes have been awarded every year since, though not in every category. News organizations submit work, or series of works, for consideration to a 19-member board, which is composed of editors, columnists, media executives, artists, and academic administrators from Columbia University, which administers the prize

== 1910s ==
- 1918: The New York Times, for Public Service, specifically for expansive coverage of World War I, including publishing the full text of "official reports, documents and speeches by European statesmen relating to the progress and conduct of the war."

== 1920s ==
- 1923: Alva Johnston, in Reporting, for science news and his reporting of the 1922 convention of the American Association for the Advancement of Science.
- 1926: Edward M. Kingsbury, in Editorial Writing, for his editorial, "The House of a Hundred Sorrows".

== 1930s ==
- 1930: Russell Owen, in Reporting, for graphic radio dispatches from the Byrd Antarctic Expedition.
- 1932: Walter Duranty, in Correspondence, for his series of dispatches from Russia describing the working out of the Five Year Plan. This award received substantial criticism in the later 1900s for failures to report on the conditions that led to the Soviet famine of 1932–33, but as of 2021, The Pulitzer board has twice declined to withdraw the award.
- 1934: Frederick T. Birchall, in Correspondence, for reporting from Europe.
- 1935: Arthur Krock, in Correspondence, for his Washington dispatches.
- 1936: Lauren D. Lyman, in Reporting, for his exclusive story revealing that Charles Lindbergh and his family were leaving the United States to live in England following hysteria surrounding the kidnap and murder of his infant son. The U.S. media had called it the "Crime of the Century" and it spurred the U.S. Congress to enact the Federal Kidnapping Act, designating kidnapping a federal crime, so that charges could be pursued even if the perpetrator crossed state lines.
- 1937: William L. Laurence, in Reporting, for his coverage of "science" at the Tercentenary Celebration at Harvard University, shared with four other reporters from other news organizations.
- 1937: Anne O'Hare McCormick, in Correspondence, for her dispatches and feature articles from Europe in 1936.
- 1938: Arthur Krock, in Correspondence, for his exclusive interview with President Franklin D. Roosevelt in 1937. This broke an "unwritten rule" among the White House press pool, and "the Washington press corps sizzled with rage at such 'favoritism'", according to a later Times Magazine report. The President apologized for granting the exclusive interview.

== 1940s ==
- 1940: Otto D. Tolischus, in Correspondence, for articles from Berlin explaining the economic and ideological background of war-engaged Nazi Germany.
- 1941: The New York Times with a special citation for the "public educational value" of its foreign news reporting, "exemplified," according to the Pulitzer Board, "by its scope, by excellence of writing and presentation and supplementary background information, illustration, and interpretation".
- 1942: Louis Stark, in Telegraphic Reporting (National), for reporting of "important labor stories" during the year.
- 1943: Hanson W. Baldwin, in Correspondence, for a series of articles reporting a wartime tour of the Southwest Pacific.
- 1944: The New York Times, in Public Service (described by the Prize Board as "for the most disinterested and meritorious public service rendered by any American newspaper during the year"), for a survey of the teaching of American history.
- 1945: James ("Scotty") Reston, in Telegraphic Reporting (National), for his coverage of the Dumbarton Oaks Conference in Washington, D.C., particularly an exclusive series that detailed how the delegates planned to set up the United Nations.
- 1946: William L. Laurence, in Reporting, for his eyewitness account of the atomic bombing of Nagasaki and other articles on the "development, production, and significance" of the atomic bomb.
- 1946: Arnaldo Cortesi, in Correspondence, for his reports from Buenos Aires in 1945.
- 1947: Brooks Atkinson, in Correspondence, for his series of articles on Russia in 1946.
- 1949: C. P. Trussell, in National Reporting, for "consistent excellence in covering the national scene from Washington".

== 1950s ==
- 1950: Meyer Berger, in Local Reporting, for an article on the killing of 13 people by a berserk gunman in Camden, New Jersey.
- 1951: Arthur Krock, with a Special Citation, for his exclusive interview with President Harry S. Truman in 1950, which revealed he did not intend to run for a third term. At the time Krock published his work (in 1950), he was a member of the Pulitzer Board. The Board noted in this 1951 award that, as a policy, it "does not make any award to an individual member of the Board"; instead, they issued no award in the National Reporting category in 1950, and awarded Krock this special award in 1951. It was the second time (following his 1938 Pulitzer Prize) that Krock had won the Prize for an exclusive interview with a sitting president—which was exceedingly rare and a contravention of unwritten rules of engagement between a President and the press pool. At the time, it was viewed as a scandal among the White House press.
- 1951: Cyrus L. Sulzberger, with a Special Award, for his interview with Archbishop Stepinac of Yugoslavia.
- 1952: Anthony H. Leviero, in National Reporting, for an exclusive article he wrote disclosing the record of conversations between President Harry S. Truman and General of the Army Douglas MacArthur at their Wake Island Conference in 1950, where they discussed the progress of the Korean War.
- 1953: The New York Times, with a Special Citation, for its "Review of the Week" section (credited as being edited by Lester Markel) which the Board said, "for seventeen years has brought enlightenment and intelligent commentary to its readers."
- 1955: Harrison E. Salisbury, in International Reporting, for a series based on his six years in Russia.
- 1956: Arthur Daley, in Local Reporting (no edition time) for his sports column, "Sports of The Times."
- 1957: James ("Scotty") Reston, in National Correspondence, for "his five-part analysis of the effect of President Eisenhower's illness on the functioning of the executive branch of the federal government".
- 1958: Staff of The New York Times, in International Reporting. The Board noted in particular The Times' "initiative, continuity, and high quality".

== 1960s ==
- 1960: A.M. Rosenthal, in International Reporting, for "perceptive and authoritative" reporting from Poland. The Pulitzer Board added, "Mr. Rosenthal's subsequent expulsion from the country was attributed by Polish government spokesmen to the depth his reporting into Polish affairs, there being no accusation of false reporting."
- 1963: Anthony Lewis, in National Reporting, for reporting on the proceedings of the United States Supreme Court that year, especially "the decision in the reapportionment case and its consequences in many of the States of the Union."
- 1964: David Halberstam, in International Reporting, for reporting from South Vietnam of the Vietnam War and the overthrow of the Diem regime (shared with Malcolm Browne of Associated Press).
- 1968: J. Anthony Lukas, in Local Investigative Specialized Reporting, for his article on an 18-year-old girl, murdered in New York City, and her two different lives.

== 1970s ==
- 1970: Ada Louise Huxtable, in Criticism, for her architecture criticism during 1969.
- 1971: Harold C. Schonberg, in Criticism, for his music criticism during 1970.
- 1972: The New York Times, in Public Service, for publication of the Pentagon Papers.
- 1973: Max Frankel, in International Reporting, for his coverage of President Richard Nixon's 1972 visit to China, which marked the first time a U.S. president had visited the PRC, the end of 25 years of no communication or diplomatic ties between the two countries.
- 1974: Hedrick Smith, in International Reporting, for his coverage of the Soviet Union and its allies in Eastern Europe in 1973.
- 1976: Sydney H. Schanberg, in International Reporting, "for his coverage of the Communist takeover in Cambodia, carried out at great risk when he elected to stay at his post after the fall of Phnom Penh."
- 1976: Walter W. Smith (Red Smith), in Commentary, for his "Sports of The Times" column in 1975 "and for many other years".
- 1978: Henry Kamm, chief Asian diplomatic correspondent, in International Reporting, for articles calling attention to the plight of Indochinese refugees.
- 1978: Walter Kerr, Sunday drama critic, in Criticism, for "articles on the theater in 1977 and throughout his long career".
- 1978: William Safire, Op-Ed Page columnist, in Commentary, for his columns on the Bert Lance affair.
- 1979: Russell Baker, in Commentary, for his "Observer" column.

== 1980s ==
- 1981: John M. Crewdson, in National Reporting, for "his coverage of illegal aliens and immigration".
- 1981: Dave Anderson, in Commentary, for his "Sports of The Times" column.
- 1982: John Darnton, in International Reporting, for his coverage of the crisis in Poland.
- 1982: Jack Rosenthal, assistant Sunday editor, in Editorial Writing.
- 1983: Thomas L. Friedman, in International Reporting, for his coverage of the war in Lebanon; shared with Loren Jenkins of The Washington Post.
- 1983: Nan C. Robertson, in Feature Writing, for her article in The New York Times Magazine on her experience with toxic shock syndrome.
- 1984: John Noble Wilford, in National Reporting, for reporting on a "wide variety of scientific topics of national import".
- 1984: Paul Goldberger, in Criticism, for architecture criticism.
- 1986: Staff of The New York Times, in Explanatory Journalism, for a series of articles on the Strategic Defense Initiative, the "Star Wars" program.
- 1986: Donal Henahan, in Criticism, for his music criticism.
- 1987: Alex S. Jones, in Specialized Reporting, for "a skillful and sensitive report of a powerful newspaper family's bickering and how it led to the sale of a famed media empire" (specifically, when Barry Bingham Sr. sold The Courier-Journal and The Louisville Times to Gannett).
- 1987: Staff of The New York Times, in National Reporting, for coverage of the aftermath and causes of the Space Shuttle Challenger disaster.
- 1988: Thomas L. Friedman, in International Reporting, for "balanced and informed" coverage of Israel.
- 1989: Bill Keller, in International Reporting, for "resourceful and detailed" coverage of events in the Soviet Union.

== 1990s ==
- 1990: Nicholas D. Kristof and Sheryl WuDunn, in International Reporting, for coverage of political turmoil in China.
- 1991: Natalie Angier, in Beat Reporting, for coverage of molecular biology and animal behavior.
- 1991: Serge Schmemann, in International Affairs, for coverage of the reunification of Germany.
- 1992: Anna Quindlen, for "Public & Private," a compelling column covering a wide range of personal and political topics
- 1992: Howell Raines, for "Grady's Gift," an account in The New York Times Magazine of his childhood friendship with his family's housekeeper and the lasting lessons of their interracial relationship.
- 1993: John F. Burns, in International Reporting, for "courageous coverage of the strife and destruction in Bosnia".
- 1994: Staff of The New York Times, for local reporting of the 1993 World Trade Center bombing, pooling the efforts of the metropolitan staff as well as Times journalists covering locations as far-ranging as the Middle East and Washington.
- 1994: Isabel Wilkerson, in Feature Writing.
- 1994: Kevin Carter, in Feature Photography, for his photograph of a vulture perching near a little girl in the Sudan who had collapsed from hunger, a picture that became an icon of starvation.
- 1995: Margo Jefferson, for her book reviews and other pieces, examples of distinguished criticism.
- 1996: Rick Bragg, in Feature Writing, for stories about contemporary America.
- 1996: Robert D. McFadden, in Spot News Reporting, for "highly skilled writing and reporting on deadline", applied to a broad range of stories.
- 1996: Robert B. Semple, Jr., in Editorial Writing, for his editorials on environmental issues.
- 1997: John F. Burns, for distinguished international reporting on the Taliban movement in Afghanistan.
- 1998: Linda Greenhouse, in Beat Reporting, for reporting on the Supreme Court's work and its significance with sophistication and a sense of history.
- 1998: Michiko Kakutani, for reviewing 1997's many major literary works in essays that were fearless and authoritative.
- 1998: Staff of The New York Times, in International Reporting, for a series of articles on the effects of drug corruption in Mexico.
- 1999: Maureen Dowd, for the moral insight and wit she brought to bear in her columns on the combat between President Bill Clinton and Kenneth Starr.
- 1999: Staff of The New York Times, notably Jeff Gerth, for a series of articles disclosing the corporate sale of American technology to China with the approval of the U.S. Government despite national security risks.

== 2000s ==
- 2001: David Cay Johnston, in Beat Reporting, for his "penetrating and enterprising reporting that exposed loopholes and inequities in the U.S. tax code, which was instrumental in bringing about reforms."
- 2001: Staff of The New York Times, in National Reporting, for its "compelling and memorable series exploring racial experiences and attitudes across contemporary America."
- 2002: The New York Times, in Public Service, for "A Nation Challenged," a daily special section covering the aftermath of the Sept. 11 attacks, the war in Afghanistan and America's campaign against terrorism. The section, which included biographical sketches of the victims, also appeared online
- 2002: Staff of The New York Times, in Breaking News Reporting, for its "comprehensive and insightful coverage, executed under the most difficult circumstances, of the terrorist attack on New York City, which recounted the day's events and their implications for the future."
- 2002: Staff of The New York Times, in Explanatory Reporting, for its "informed and detailed reporting ... that profiled the global terrorism network and the threats it posed."
- 2002: Gretchen Morgenson, in Beat Reporting, for her "trenchant and incisive Wall Street coverage."
- 2002: Barry Bearak, in International Reporting, for his "deeply affecting and illuminating coverage of daily life in war-torn Afghanistan."
- 2002: Thomas Friedman, in Commentary, for his "clarity of vision, based on extensive reporting, in commenting on the worldwide impact of the terrorist threat."
- 2002: Staff of The New York Times, for its "consistently outstanding photographic coverage of the terrorist attack on New York City and its aftermath."
- 2002: Staff of The New York Times, for its "photographs chronicling the pain and the perseverance of people enduring protracted conflict in Afghanistan and Pakistan."
- 2003: Clifford J. Levy, for investigative reporting, for his "Broken Homes" series that exposed the abuse of mentally ill adults in state-regulated homes.
- 2004: The New York Times, for public service, for its series written by David Barstow and Lowell Bergman that examined death and injury among American workers and exposed employers who break basic safety rules.
- 2005: Walt Bogdanich, for national reporting, for his investigative series about the corporate cover-up of responsibility for fatal accidents at railway crossings.
- 2006: Nicholas D. Kristof for commentary on bringing the genocide in Darfur to the world's attention
- 2006: Joseph Kahn and Jim Yardley for international reporting for their examination of China's legal system
- 2006: James Risen and Eric Lichtblau for national reporting for their coverage of the United States' government's secret eavesdropping program.
- 2007: Andrea Elliott for feature writing for coverage of an immigrant imam striving to serve his faithful in America.
- 2008: Amy Harmon for explanatory reporting on the social impact of genetic tests
- 2008: Walt Bogdanich and Jake Hooker for investigative reporting on how contaminated ingredients from China make their way into consumer goods, including medicine.
- 2009: David Barstow for his tenacious reporting that revealed how some retired generals, working as radio and television analysts, had been co-opted by the Pentagon to make its case for the war in Iraq, and how many of them also had undisclosed ties to companies that benefited from policies they defended.
- 2009: Pulitzer Prize for Breaking News Reporting "for its swift and sweeping coverage of a sex scandal that resulted in the resignation of Gov. Eliot Spitzer, breaking the story on its Web site and then developing it with authoritative, rapid-fire reports."

== 2010s ==
- 2010: Michael Moss, in Explanatory Reporting, for an investigative feature on food safety (e.g., contaminated meat)
- 2010: Matt Richtel, in National Reporting, for a series on the dangers of distracted driving
- 2010: Sheri Fink of ProPublica in collaboration with The New York Times Magazine, in Investigative Reporting, for "The Deadly Choices At Memorial" about Hurricane Katrina survivors (award shared with the Philadelphia Daily News).
- 2011: Clifford J. Levy and Ellen Barry, in International Reporting, for their "Above the Law" series, which examined abuse of power in Russia, showing how authorities had jailed, beaten or harassed citizens who opposed them
- 2011: David Leonhardt, in Commentary, for his weekly column "Economic Scene" which offered perspectives on the formidable problems confronting America, from creating jobs to recalibrating tax rates.
- 2012: David Kocieniewski, in Explanatory Reporting, for his series on tax avoidance.
- 2012: Jeffrey Gettleman, in International Reporting, for his reports on famine and conflict in East Africa.
- 2013: David Barstow and Alejandra Xanic von Bertrab, in Investigative Reporting, for describing bribery by Walmart in Mexico
- 2013: Staff of The New York Times, in Explanatory Reporting, for examining global business practices of Apple Inc. and other technology companies
- 2013: David Barboza, in International Reporting, for exposing corruption in the Chinese government
- 2013: John Branch, in Feature Writing, for "Snow Fall", a multimedia presentation about avalanches.
- 2014: Tyler Hicks, in Breaking News Photography, for his "compelling pictures that showed skill and bravery in documenting the unfolding terrorist attack at Westgate mall in Kenya."
- 2014: Josh Haner, in Feature Photography, for his "moving essay on a Boston Marathon bomb blast victim who lost most of both legs and now is painfully rebuilding his life."
- 2015: Eric Lipton, in Investigative Reporting, for reporting that showed how the influence of lobbyists can sway congressional leaders and state attorneys general, slanting justice toward the wealthy and connected
- 2015: Staff of The New York Times, in International Reporting, for "courageous front-line reporting and vivid human stories on Ebola in Africa, engaging the public with the scope and details of the outbreak while holding authorities accountable" (Team members named by The Times were Pam Belluck, Helene Cooper, Sheri Fink, Adam Nossiter, Norimitsu Onishi, Kevin Sack, and Ben C. Solomon).
- 2015: Daniel Berehulak, in Feature Photography, for his "gripping, courageous photographs of the Ebola epidemic in West Africa."
- 2016: Tyler Hicks, Mauricio Lima, Sergey Ponomarev and Daniel Etter for breaking news photography for coverage of the ongoing migrant crisis in Europe and the Middle East.
- 2016: Alissa Rubin, in International Reporting, for her coverage of the lives of women and girls in Afghanistan including the murder of young Afghan woman who was beaten to death by a mob after being falsely accused of burning a Quran; John Woo and Adam Ellick produced an accompanying video about the murder.
- 2017: C.J. Chivers, in Feature Writing, for showing, "through an artful accumulation of fact and detail", that a Marine's postwar descent into violence reflected neither the actions of a simple criminal nor a stereotypical case of PTSD.
- 2017: Staff of The New York Times, in International Reporting, for agenda-setting reporting on Vladimir Putin's efforts to project Russia's power abroad, revealing techniques that included assassination, online harassment and the planting of incriminating evidence on opponents.
- 2017: Daniel Berehulak, in Breaking News Photography, for powerful storytelling through images published in The New York Times showing the callous disregard for human life in the Philippines brought about by a government assault on drug dealers and users. (Moved into this category from Feature Photography by the nominating jury.)
- 2018: Jodi Kantor, Megan Twohey, Emily Steel, and Michael S. Schmidt in Public Service, for "explosive, impactful journalism that exposed powerful and wealthy sexual predators, including allegations against one of Hollywood's most influential producers, bringing them to account for long-suppressed allegations of coercion, brutality and victim silencing, thus spurring a worldwide reckoning about sexual abuse of women." (Received jointly with Ronan Farrow of The New Yorker.)
- 2018: Staff of The New York Times, in National Reporting, for "deeply sourced, relentlessly reported coverage in the public interest that dramatically furthered the nation's understanding of Russian interference in the 2016 presidential election and its connections to the Trump campaign, the President-elect's transition team and his eventual administration." (Received jointly with the Washington Post.)
- 2018: Jake Halpern and Michael Sloan, in Editorial Cartooning, for "an emotionally powerful series, told in graphic narrative form, that chronicled the daily struggles of a real-life family of refugees and its fear of deportation."
- 2019: David Barstow, Susanne Craig and Russ Buettner, in Explanatory Reporting, for "an exhaustive 18-month investigation of President Donald Trump's finances that debunked his claims of self-made wealth and revealed a business empire riddled with tax dodges."
- 2019: Brent Staples, in Editorial Writing, for "editorials written with extraordinary moral clarity that charted the racial fault lines in the United States at a polarizing moment in the nation's history."

== 2020s ==
- 2020: Brian M. Rosenthal, in Investigative Reporting, for reporting on a predatory lending scheme "that ultimately led to state and federal investigations and sweeping reforms."
- 2020: Staff of The New York Times, in International Reporting (staff named by The Times included Michael Schwirtz, David D. Kirkpatrick, and Dionne Searcey).
- 2020: Nikole Hannah-Jones, in Commentary, for the 1619 Project.
- 2021: Staff of The New York Times, in Public Service for "courageous, prescient and sweeping coverage of the coronavirus pandemic."
- 2021: Wesley Morris, in Criticism, for "unrelentingly relevant and deeply engaged criticism on the intersection of race and culture in America."
- 2023: Staff of The New York Times, in International Reporting, "for their unflinching coverage of Russia's invasion of Ukraine, including an eight-month investigation into Ukrainian deaths in the town of Bucha and the Russian unit responsible for the killings."
- 2023: Mona Chalabi, in The New York Times Magazine, for examining the wealth of Amazon founder Jeff Bezos.
- 2024: Staff of The New York Times in the international reporting category, for coverage of the Gaza war.
- 2024: Hannah Dreier, in Investigative Reporting, for "revealing the stunning reach of migrant child labor across the United States."
- 2024: Katie Engelhart, in Feature Writing, for "her fair-minded portrait of a family’s legal and emotional struggles during a matriarch’s progressive dementia."

== Finalists ==
In 1980, The Pulitzer Prizes began noting finalists for each category, alongside the full prize winners. The New York Times and its reporters have been named more than a dozen times as finalists.

== Controversies ==
As new reporting adds additional perspective to previously reported topics, the quality and even the veracity of some reporting comes under question.

- Walter Duranty's 1932 reporting for The New York Times on the news from Russia—and subsequently the Pulitzer Prize it was awarded—came under intense criticism for its failures to report on the conditions that led to the Soviet famine of 1932–33. Critics mounted campaigns for the award to be revoked, once in 1990, and again 2003. Voices for The New York Times both times wrote highly critical reviews of Duranty's work. As of 2021, the Pulitzer Board has twice discussed withdrawing the award—most recently in 2003—but declined to withdraw the award both times.
- In 2005, journalists Amy Goodman and David Goodman filed a request with the Pulitzer Board to revoke William L. Laurence's 1946 Pulitzer Prize. They alleged he had been employed by the U.S. War Department to write "military press releases and statements for President Harry S. Truman and Secretary of War Henry L. Stimson" for four months while also employed by The New York Times to report on the atomic bomb. David Goodman remarked in an interview with Democracy Now! that Laurence seemed to have been "completely unashamed and unrepentant of what was clearly an egregious conflict of interest by any of the most basic canons of journalism ethics."
- Reporter Rukmini Callimachi was one of three finalists from The New York Times named for the 2019 Pulitzer Prizes (in addition to the two prizes awarded), but it came to light in 2020 that the reporting's central source had likely fabricated their story; The New York Times volunteered to return the award.

== See also ==
- List of awards won by The New York Times
