= Pulitzer Prize Special Citations and Awards =

Special category of Pulitzer Prize

The Pulitzer Prize jury has the option of awarding special citations and awards where they consider necessary.

Prizes for the award vary. The Pulitzer Prize Board has stated that the Special Citations given to George Gershwin, Thelonious Monk, John Coltrane and Duke Ellington were in response to criticism for the failure of the Board to cite the four.

On May 4, 2020, Ida B. Wells was announced as the recipient of a Pulitzer Special Citation "[f]or her outstanding and courageous reporting on the horrific and vicious violence against African Americans during the era of lynching." The Pulitzer Prize board announced that it would donate at least $50,000 in support of Wells' mission to recipients who would be announced at a later date. No specific category was announced for this citation.

On June 11, 2021, Darnella Frazier was announced as the recipient of a Pulitzer Special Citation.

== Winners ==
Year	Name(s)	Work(s)	Type	Rationale	Refs
1918	Sara Teasdale	Love Songs	Letters	This award was made possible by a special grant from The Poetry Society.	
1919	Carl Sandburg	Corn Huskers	Letters	This award was made possible by a special grant from The Poetry Society.	
1919	Margaret Widdemer	Old Road to Paradise	Letters	This award was made possible by a special grant from The Poetry Society.	
1924	Margaret Hubbard Ayer	New York World	Journalism	"A special prize of $1000 was awarded to the widow of Frank I. Cobb in recognition of the distinction of her husband's editorial writing and service."	
1930	William Dapping	The Auburn Citizen	Journalism	"A special prize for his reportorial work in connection with the outbreak at Auburn prison during December 1929."	
1938	Staff	Edmonton Journal	Journalism	"A special bronze plaque for its editorial leadership against the Accurate News and Information Act, in defense of the freedom of the press, in the Province of Alberta, Canada."	
1941	Staff	The New York Times	Journalism	"for the public educational value of its foreign news report, exemplified by its scope, by excellence of writing and presentation and supplementary background information, illustration, and interpretation"	
1944	Oscar Hammerstein	Oklahoma	Drama	"A special award for Oklahoma!"	
1944	Richard Rodgers	Oklahoma	Drama	"A special award for Oklahoma!"	
1944	Byron Price	N/A	Journalism	"for the creation and administration of the newspaper and radio codes."	
1944	William White	N/A	Service	"A scroll indicating appreciation of Mr. White's interest and services during the past seven years as a member of the Advisory Board of the Graduate School of Journalism, Columbia University."	
1945	Cartographers of the American press	N/A	Journalism	"for maps of the war fronts that have helped notably to clarify and increase public information on the progress of the Armies and Navies engaged."	
1947	Staff	St. Louis Post-Dispatch	Journalism	"for its unswerving adherence to the public and professional ideals of its founder and its constructive leadership in the field of American journalism."	
1947	Columbia University	N/A	Service	"Columbia University and the Graduate School of Journalism, for their efforts to maintain and advance the high standards governing the Pulitzer Prize awards."	
1947	Columbia University Graduate School of Journalism	N/A	Service	"Columbia University and the Graduate School of Journalism, for their efforts to maintain and advance the high standards governing the Pulitzer Prize awards."	
1948	Frank Fackenthal	N/A	Service	"A scroll indicating appreciation of his interest and service during the past years."	
1951	Cyrus Sulzberger (Note: The Advisory Board on the Pulitzer Prizes as a policy does not make any award to an individual member of the board. In 1951, the board decided that the outstanding instance of National Reporting done in 1950 was the exclusive interview with President Truman obtained by Arthur Krock of The New York Times, while Mr. Krock was a board member. The board therefore made no award in the National Reporting category.)	The New York Times	Journalism	"for his exclusive interview with Archbishop Stepinac."	
1952	Max Kase	New York Journal-American	Journalism	"for his exclusive exposures of bribery and other forms of corruption in the popular American sport of basketball, which exposures tended to restore confidence in the game's integrity."	
1952	Staff	The Kansas City Star	Journalism	"for the news coverage of the great regional flood of 1951 in Kansas and Northwestern Missouri - a distinguished example of editing and reporting that also gave the advance information that achieved the maximum of public protection."	
1953	Staff	The New York Times	Journalism	"for the section of its Sunday newspaper edited by Lester Markel and headed, "Review of the Week," which for seventeen years has brought enlightenment and intelligent commentary to its readers."	
1957	Kenneth Roberts	Various	Letters	"A special citation is awarded to Kenneth Roberts for his historical novels which have long contributed to the creation of greater interest in our early American history."	
1958	Walter Lippmann	New York Herald Tribune	Journalism	"for the wisdom, perception and high sense of responsibility with which he has commented for many years on national and international affairs."	
1960	Garrett Mattingly	The Defeat of the Spanish Armada	Letters	"A special citation is awarded to The Defeat of the Spanish Armada by Garrett Mattingly, published by Houghton, Mifflin. It is a first-class history and a literary work of high order."	
1961	Bruce Catton	The American Heritage Picture History of the Civil War	Letters	"A special citation is given to The American Heritage Picture History of the Civil War as a distinguished example of American book publishing."	
1964	Staff	Gannett News Service	Journalism	"A special citation for their program, "The Road to Integration," a distinguished example of the use of a newspaper group's resources to complement the work of its individual newspapers."	
1973	James Flexner	George Washington, Vols. I-IV	Letters	"A special citation to George Washington, Vols. I-IV, by James Thomas Flexner."	
1974	Roger Sessions	All works	Music	"A special citation to Roger Sessions for his life's work as a distinguished American composer."	
1976	John Hohenberg	N/A	Service	"A special citation and an antique plaque inscribed by all the members of the Advisory Board, expressing appreciation for his services for 22 years as Administrator of the Pulitzer Prizes and for his achievements as teacher and journalist"	
1976	Scott Joplin	All works	Music	"A special award is bestowed posthumously on Scott Joplin, in this Bicentennial Year, for his contributions to American music."	
1977	Alex Haley	Roots	Letters	"A special award to Alex Haley for Roots, the story of a black family from its origins in Africa through seven generations to the present day in America."	
1978	Richard Strout	The Christian Science Monitor	Journalism	"for distinguished commentary from Washington over many years as staff correspondent for The Christian Science Monitor and contributor to The New Republic."	
1978	E. B. White	All works	Letters	"A special citation to E. B. White for his letters, essays, and the full body of his work."	
1982	Milton Babbitt	All works	Music	"A special citation to Milton Babbitt for his life's work as a distinguished and seminal American composer"	
1984	Theodor Geisel	All works	Letters	"A special citation to Theodor Seuss Geisel, more widely known as Dr. Seuss, for his special contribution over nearly half a century to the education and enjoyment of America's children and their parents."	
1985	William Schuman	All works	Music	A special citation to William Schuman for more than half a century of contribution to American music as composer and educational leader.	
1987	Joseph Pulitzer	N/A	Service	"for his extraordinary services to American journalism and letters during his 31 years as chairman of the Pulitzer Prize Board and for his accomplishments as an editor and publisher."	
1992	Art Spiegelman	Maus	Letters	"For Maus"	
1996	Herb Caen	San Francisco Chronicle	Journalism	"for his extraordinary and continuing contribution as a voice and conscience of his city."	
1998	George Gershwin	All works	Music	"Awarded posthumously to George Gershwin, commemorating the centennial year of his birth, for his distinguished and enduring contributions to American music."	
1999	Duke Ellington	All works	Music	"Bestowed posthumously on Edward Kennedy "Duke" Ellington, commemorating the centennial year of his birth, in recognition of his musical genius, which evoked aesthetically the principles of democracy through the medium of jazz and thus made an indelible contribution to art and culture."	
2006	Thelonious Monk	All works	Music	"for his body of distinguished and innovative musical composition that has had a significant and enduring impact on the evolution of jazz."	
2006	Edmund Morgan	All works	Letters	"A Special Citation to Edmund S. Morgan for a creative and deeply influential body of work as an American historian that spans the last half-century."	
2007	Ray Bradbury	All works	Letters	"for his distinguished, prolific and deeply influential career as an unmatched author of science fiction and fantasy."	
2007	John Coltrane	All works	Music	"for his masterful improvisation, supreme musicianship and iconic centrality to the history of jazz."	
2008	Bob Dylan	All works	Music	"for his profound impact on popular music and American culture, marked by lyrical compositions of extraordinary poetic power."	
2010	Hank Williams	All works	Music	"for his craftsmanship as a songwriter who expressed universal feelings with poignant simplicity and played a pivotal role in transforming country music into a major musical and cultural force in American life."	
2019	Aretha Franklin	All works	Music	"for her indelible contribution to American music and culture for more than five decades."	
2019	Staff	Capital Gazette	Journalism	"A special citation to honor the journalists, staff and editorial board of the Capital Gazette, Annapolis, Maryland, for their courageous response to the largest killing of journalists in U.S. history in their newsroom on June 28, 2018, and for demonstrating unflagging commitment to covering the news and serving their community at a time of unspeakable grief. The citation comes with a $100,000 bequest by the Pulitzer Board to be used to further the newspaper's journalistic mission."	
2020	Ida B. Wells	N/A	Journalism	"for her outstanding and courageous reporting on the horrific and vicious violence against African Americans during the era of lynching."	
2021	Darnella Frazier	N/A	Journalism	"for courageously recording the murder of George Floyd, a video that spurred protests against police brutality around the world, highlighting the crucial role of citizens in journalists' quest for truth and justice."	
2025	Chuck Stone	National Association of Black Journalists	Journalism	"A special citation is awarded to the late Chuck Stone for his groundbreaking work as a journalist covering the Civil Rights Movement, his pioneering role as the first Black columnist at the Philadelphia Daily News—later syndicated to nearly 100 publications—and for co-founding the National Association of Black Journalists 50 years ago."	
2025	Chuck Stone	Philadelphia Daily News	Journalism	"A special citation is awarded to the late Chuck Stone for his groundbreaking work as a journalist covering the Civil Rights Movement, his pioneering role as the first Black columnist at the Philadelphia Daily News—later syndicated to nearly 100 publications—and for co-founding the National Association of Black Journalists 50 years ago."	
2026	Julie Brown	Miami Herald	Journalism	"A special citation is awarded to Miami Herald reporter Julie K. Brown for her groundbreaking reporting in 2017 and 2018 that exposed Jeffrey Epstein's systematic abuse of young women, the justice system that protected him, and, over time, his powerful network of associates and enablers. Her Perversion of Justice series, published nearly a decade ago, revealed how prosecutors shielded Epstein from federal sex trafficking charges when he was first accused of abusing young women. She went on to document and give voice to the scores of victims who had been groomed and abused by him and others in his circle. Her work, and the release of the government's Epstein files, continue to reverberate around the world."	
