= Pulitzer Prize =

Awards for American journalism and arts

- Current: 2026 Pulitzer Prize
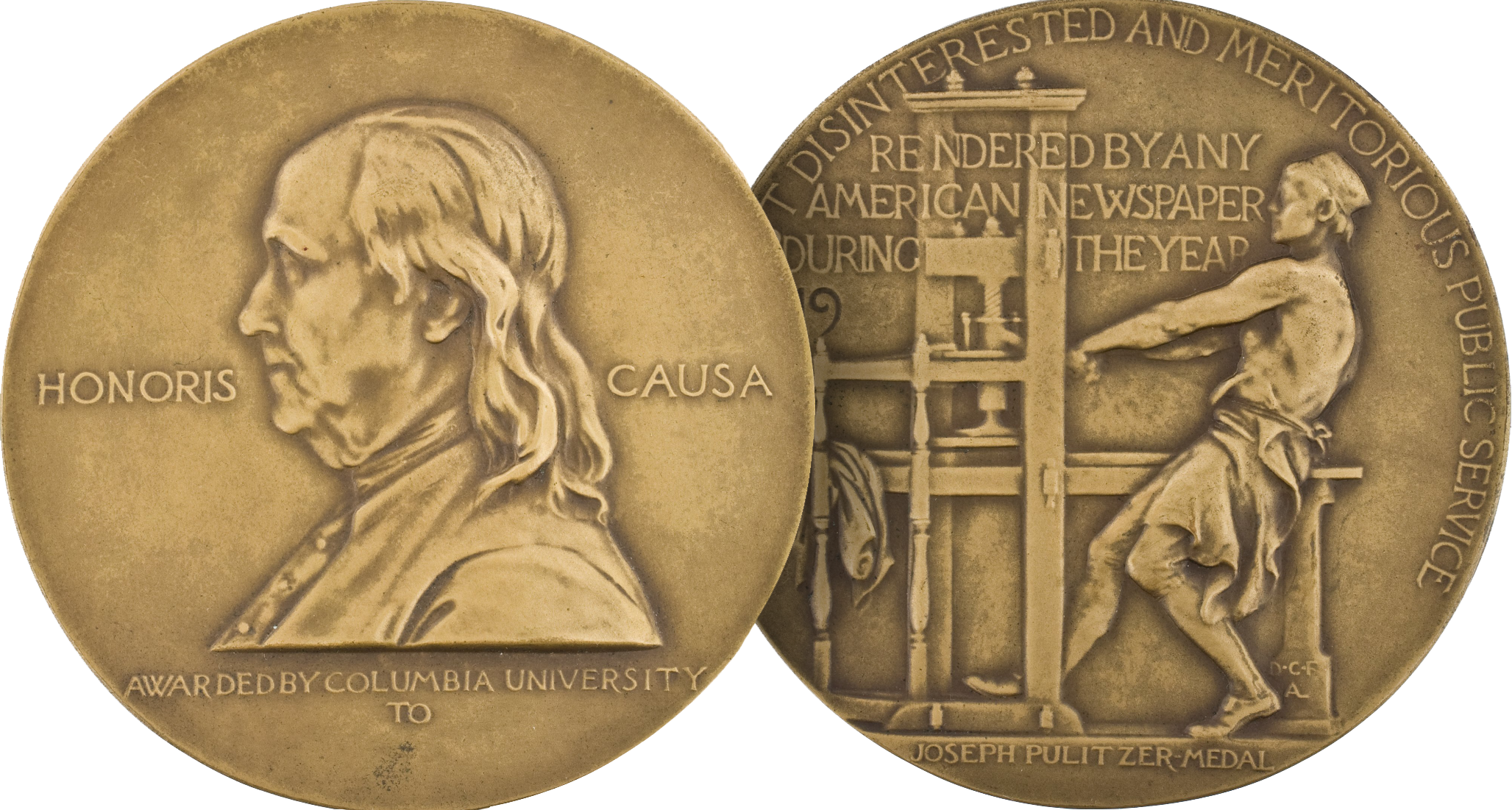
- Obverse and reverse sides of the Pulitzer Prize for Public Service gold medal, designed by sculptor Daniel Chester French in 1917
- Awarded for: Excellence in newspaper journalism, literary achievements, musical composition
- Country: United States
- Presented by: Columbia University
- First award: June 4, 1917; 109 years ago
- Website: pulitzer.org

The Pulitzer Prizes (/ˈpʊlɪtsər/ PULL-it-sər) (Note: The pronunciation /ˈpjuːlɪtsər/ PEW-lit-sər, although mistaken, is quite common, and included in the major British and American dictionaries.) are 23 annual American awards for achievements in "journalism, arts and letters", administered by Columbia University in New York City. They were established in 1917 by the will of Joseph Pulitzer, a Hungarian-American immigrant and newspaper publisher whose bequest also founded and endowed the Columbia School of Journalism. First awarded in June 1917, they remain among the most prestigious national honors for American journalism.

The prizes are awarded each spring following recommendations from the Pulitzer Prize Board, whose voting membership consists mainly of leading journalists and news executives, along with academics and figures in the arts; the dean of the Columbia journalism school and the administrator of the prizes serve as non-voting members. Fifteen of the Pulitzer Prizes are awarded for journalism, and eight for achievements in books, drama, and music. Three finalists are named for each award. All categories are initially juried; the juries nominate the finalists, from which the board selects a winner. The board also has the discretion to move entries between categories or to decline to grant an award in a category.

Each award carries with it a certificate and a monetary prize of $15,000, except in the Public Service category, in which the winning news organization receives a gold medal. The value of the monetary award has changed over the history of the prizes; it was increased from $10,000 to $15,000 beginning with the 2017 awards.

== History ==
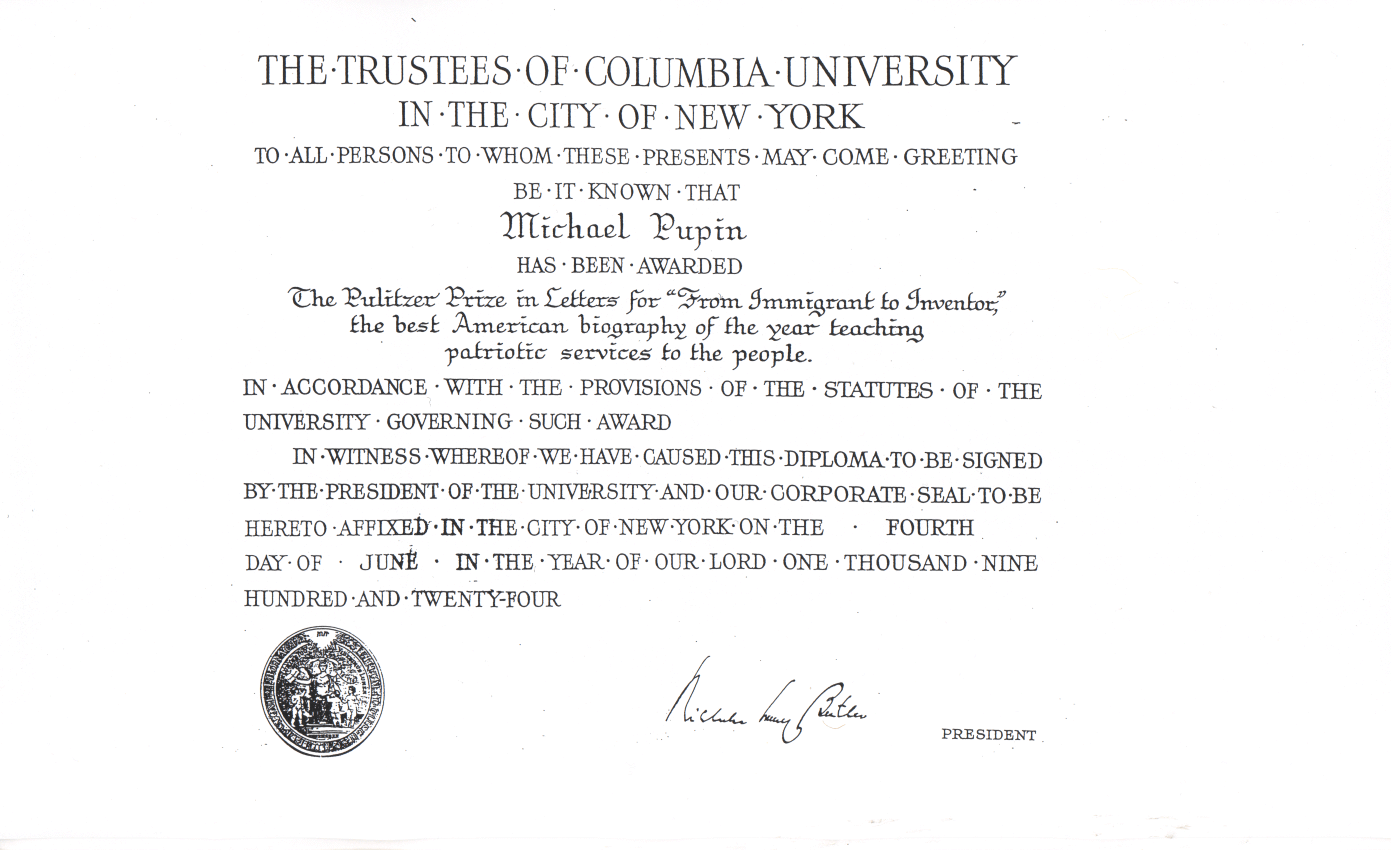
The 1924 Pulitzer Prize for autobiography certificate issued to Mihajlo Pupin; the certificate is modeled on Columbia University's diploma.

Newspaper publisher Joseph Pulitzer gave money in his will to Columbia University to launch a journalism school and establish the Pulitzer Prize. It allocated $250,000 to the prize and scholarships. He specified "four awards in journalism, four in letters and drama, one in education, and four traveling scholarships".

After his death on October 29, 1911, the first Pulitzer Prizes were awarded June 4, 1917; they are now announced in May. The Chicago Tribune under the control of Colonel Robert R. McCormick felt that the Pulitzer Prize was nothing more than a 'mutual admiration society' and not to be taken seriously; the paper refused to compete for the prize during McCormick's tenure up until 1961.

== Entry and prize consideration ==
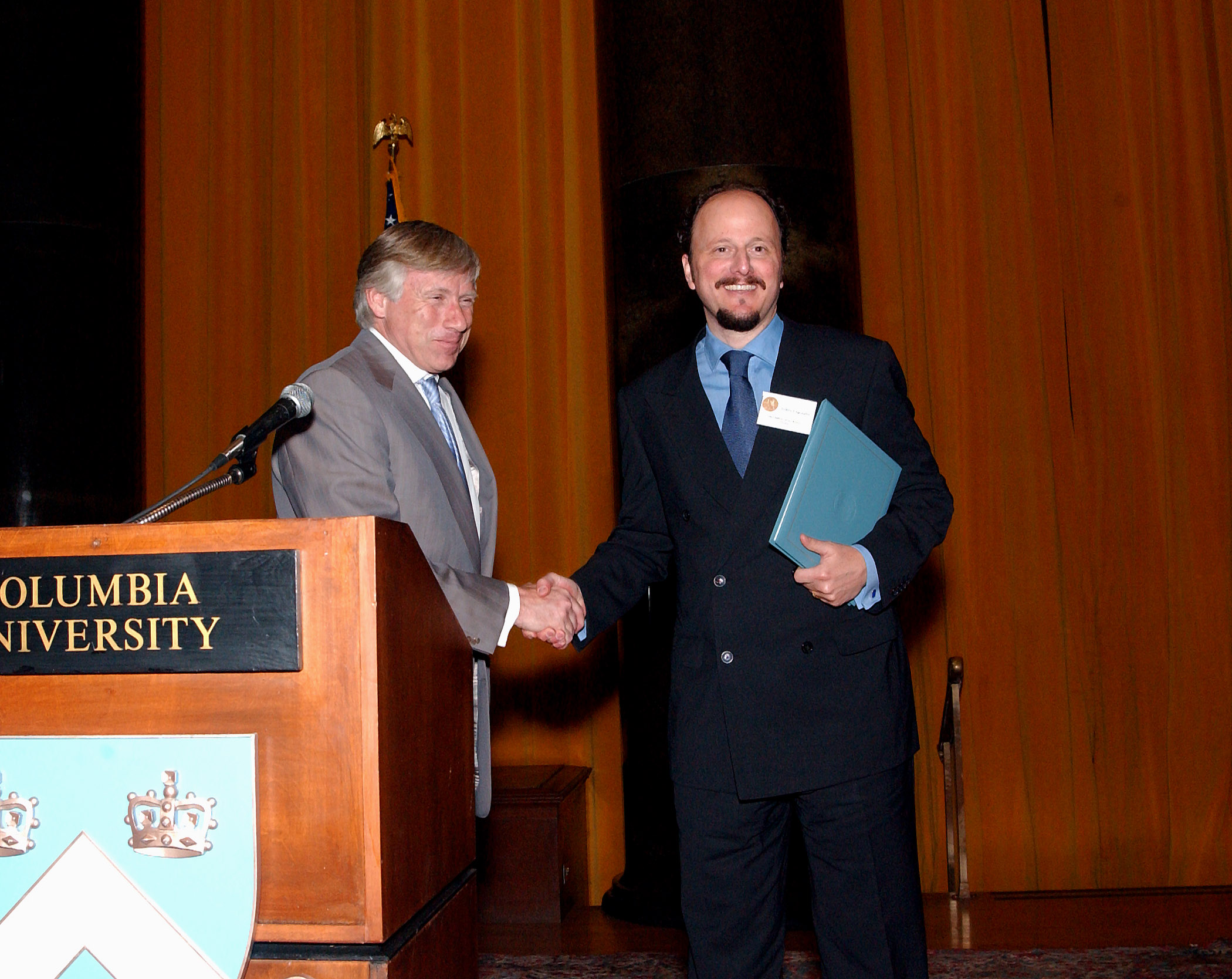
Columbia President Lee Bollinger presents the 2003 Pulitzer Prize for Fiction to Jeffrey Eugenides.

The Pulitzer Prize does not automatically consider all applicable works in the media and the arts, but customarily those that have specifically been entered and reviewed for administrative compliance by the administrator's staff. Entries must fit in at least one of the specific prize categories, and cannot simply gain entrance for being literary or musical. Works can only be entered in a maximum of two relevant categories, regardless of their properties. Currently, entrants in the Book, Drama and Music categories must be United States citizens, permanent residents of the United States or those who otherwise consider the United States to be their longtime primary home; however, eligible work must be published by United States-based entities. Entrants to the Journalism categories are not restricted by nationality, provided their submitted work appeared in a United States-based publication.

Each year, more than 100 jurors are selected by the Pulitzer Prize Board to serve on 22 separate juries for the 23 award categories; one jury makes recommendations for both photography awards. Most juries consist of five members, except for those for Public Service, Investigative Reporting, Explanatory Reporting, Feature Writing, Commentary and Audio Reporting categories, which have seven members; however, all book juries have five members. For each award category, a jury makes three nominations. The board selects the winner by majority vote from the nominations, or bypasses the nominations and selects a different entry following a 75 percent majority vote. The board can also vote to issue no award. The board and journalism jurors are not paid for their work; however, jurors in letters, music, and drama receive honoraria for the year.

=== Difference between entrants and nominated finalists ===
Anyone whose work has been submitted is called an entrant. The jury selects a group of nominated finalists and announces them, together with the winner for each category. However, some journalists and authors who were only submitted, but not nominated as finalists, still claim to be Pulitzer nominees in promotional material.

The Pulitzer Board has cautioned entrants against claiming to be nominees. The Pulitzer Prize website's Frequently Asked Questions section describes their policy as follows: "Nominated Finalists are selected by the Nominating Juries for each category as finalists in the competition. The Pulitzer Prize Board generally selects the Pulitzer Prize Winners from the three nominated finalists in each category. The names of nominated finalists have been announced only since 1980. Work that has been submitted for Prize consideration but not chosen as either a nominated finalist or a winner is termed an entry or submission. No information on entrants is provided. Since 1980, when we began to announce nominated finalists, we have used the term 'nominee' for entrants who became finalists. We discourage someone saying he or she was 'nominated' for a Pulitzer simply because an entry was sent to us."

Bill Dedman of NBC News, the recipient of the 1989 investigative reporting prize, pointed out in 2012 that financial journalist Betty Liu was described as "Pulitzer Prize–Nominated" in her Bloomberg Television advertising and the jacket of her book, while National Review writer Jonah Goldberg made similar claims of "Pulitzer nomination" to promote his books. Dedman wrote, "To call that submission a Pulitzer 'nomination' is like saying that Adam Sandler is an Oscar nominee if Columbia Pictures enters That's My Boy in the Academy Awards. Many readers realize that the Oscars don't work that way—the studios don't pick the nominees. It's just a way of slipping 'Academy Awards' into a bio. The Pulitzers also don't work that way, but fewer people know that."

Nominally, the Pulitzer Prize for Public Service is awarded only to news organizations, not individuals. In rare instances, contributors to the entry are singled out in the citation in a manner analogous to individual winners. Journalism awards may be awarded to individuals or newspapers or newspaper staffs; infrequently, staff Prize citations also distinguish the work of prominent contributors.

== Categories ==
Awards are made in categories relating to journalism, arts, letters and fiction. Reports and photographs by United States–based newspapers, magazines and news organizations (including news websites) that "[publish] regularly" are eligible for the journalism prize. Beginning in 2007, "an assortment of online elements will be permitted in all journalism categories except for the competition's two photography categories, which will continue to restrict entries to still images." In December 2008, it was announced that for the first time content published in online-only news sources would be considered.

Although certain winners with magazine affiliations (most notably Moneta Sleet Jr.) were allowed to enter the competition due to eligible partnerships or concurrent publication of their work in newspapers, the Pulitzer Prize Advisory Board and the eventual Pulitzer Prize Board historically resisted the admission of magazines into the competition, resulting in the formation of the National Magazine Awards at the Columbia Journalism School in 1966.

In 2015, magazines were allowed to enter for the first time in two categories (Investigative Reporting and Feature Writing). By 2016, this provision had expanded to three additional categories (International Reporting, Criticism and Editorial Cartooning). That year, Kathryn Schulz (Feature Writing) and Emily Nussbaum (Criticism) of The New Yorker became the first magazine affiliates to receive the prize under the expanded eligibility criterion.

In October 2016, magazine eligibility was extended to all journalism categories. Hitherto confined to the local reporting of breaking news, the Breaking News Reporting category was expanded to encompass all domestic breaking news events in 2017.

Definitions of Pulitzer Prize categories as presented in the December 2017 Plan of Award:

- Public Service – for a distinguished example of meritorious public service by a newspaper, magazine or news site through the use of its journalistic resources, including the use of stories, editorials, cartoons, photographs, graphics, videos, databases, multimedia or interactive presentations or other visual material. Often thought of as the grand prize, and mentioned first in listings of the journalism prizes, the Public Service award is only given to the winning news organization. Alone among the Pulitzer Prizes, it is awarded in the form of a gold medal.
- Breaking News Reporting – for a distinguished example of local, state or national reporting of breaking news that, as quickly as possible, captures events accurately as they occur, and, as time passes, illuminates, provides context and expands upon the initial coverage.
- Investigative Reporting – for a distinguished example of investigative reporting, using any available journalistic tool.
- Explanatory Reporting – for a distinguished example of explanatory reporting that illuminates a significant and complex subject, demonstrating mastery of the subject, lucid writing and clear presentation, using any available journalistic tool.
- Local Reporting – for a distinguished example of reporting on significant issues of local concern, demonstrating originality and community expertise, using any available journalistic tool.
- National Reporting – for a distinguished example of reporting on national affairs, using any available journalistic tool.
- International Reporting – for a distinguished example of reporting on international affairs, using any available journalistic tool.
- Feature Writing – for distinguished feature writing giving prime consideration to quality of writing, originality and concision, using any available journalistic tool.
- Commentary – for distinguished commentary, using any available journalistic tool.
- Criticism – for distinguished criticism, using any available journalistic tool.
- Editorial Writing – for distinguished editorial writing, the test of excellence being clearness of style, moral purpose, sound reasoning, and power to influence public opinion in what the writer conceives to be the right direction, using any available journalistic tool.
- Editorial Cartooning – for a distinguished cartoon or portfolio of cartoons, characterized by originality, editorial effectiveness, quality of drawing and pictorial effect, published as a still drawing, animation or both.
- Breaking News Photography, previously called Spot News Photography – for a distinguished example of breaking news photography in black and white or color, which may consist of a photograph or photographs.
- Feature Photography – for a distinguished example of feature photography in black and white or color, which may consist of a photograph or photographs.

In 2020, the Audio Reporting category was added. The first prize in this category was awarded to "The Out Crowd", an episode of the public radio program This American Life. In the second year, the Pulitzer was awarded for the NPR podcast No Compromise.

There are seven categories in letters and drama:

- Biography – for a distinguished biography, autobiography or memoir by an American author.
- Drama – for a distinguished play by an American playwright, preferably original in its source and dealing with American life.
- Fiction – for distinguished fiction by an American author, preferably dealing with American life.
- General Nonfiction – for a distinguished and appropriately documented book of nonfiction by an American author that is not eligible for consideration in any other category.
- History – for a distinguished and appropriately documented book on the history of the United States.
- Memoir or Autobiography – for a distinguished and factual memoir or autobiography by an American author.
- Poetry – for a distinguished volume of original verse by an American poet.

There is one prize given for music:

- Pulitzer Prize for Music – for distinguished musical composition by an American that has had its first performance or recording in the United States during the year.

There have been dozens of Special Citations and Awards: more than ten each in Arts, Journalism, and Letters, and five for Pulitzer Prize service, most recently to Joseph Pulitzer, Jr. in 1987.

In addition to the prizes, Pulitzer Traveling Fellowships are awarded to four outstanding students of the Graduate School of Journalism as selected by the faculty.

=== Changes to categories ===
Over the years, awards have been discontinued either because the field of the award has been expanded to encompass other areas; the award has been renamed because the common terminology changed; or the award has become obsolete, such as the prizes for telegraphic reporting.

An example of a writing field that has been expanded was the former Pulitzer Prize for the Novel (awarded 1918–1947), which has been changed to the Pulitzer Prize for Fiction, which also includes short stories, novellas, novelettes, and poetry, as well as novels. Chronology of Pulitzer Prize categories

1910s			1920s										1930s										1940s										1950s										1960s										1970s										1980s										1990s										2000s										2010s										2020s				Current categories
17	18	19	20	21	22	23	24	25	26	27	28	29	30	31	32	33	34	35	36	37	38	39	40	41	42	43	44	45	46	47	48	49	50	51	52	53	54	55	56	57	58	59	60	61	62	63	64	65	66	67	68	69	70	71	72	73	74	75	76	77	78	79	80	81	82	83	84	85	86	87	88	89	90	91	92	93	94	95	96	97	98	99	00	01	02	03	04	05	06	07	08	09	10	11	12	13	14	15	16	17	18	19	20	21	22	23	Current categories
Journalism																																																																Journalism																																											
17		19		21	Editorial Writing								30		32			35																																														81												93															08				12												Editorial Writing
17		19	Reporting								28	47																																																																																															–
17			20					25					30	Public Service																																																																Public Service																													
	18	Newspaper History																																																																																																									–
					22	23	Editorial Cartooning												36																								60					65								73	20																																															21	22		Illustrated Reporting and Commentary
												29	Correspondence																	47																																																																													–
													Telegraphic Reporting – International												42	47					48	International Reporting																												77																																															International Reporting
													Telegraphic Reporting – National												42	43	47				48			51	National Reporting																																																																National Reporting								
																									42	Photography																								67	68	Spot News Photography																														99	00	Breaking News Photography																							Breaking News Photography
																									42	Photography																								67	68	Feature Photography																																																							Feature Photography
																															48	Local Reporting			52	53	Local Reporting – Edition Time									63	64	Local General or Spot News Reporting																			84	85	General News Rep.				90	91	Spot News Reporting					97	98	Breaking News Reporting												11													Breaking News Reporting
																															48	Local Reporting			52	53	Local Reporting – No Edition Time									63	64	Local Investigative Specialized Reporting																			84	85	Investigative Reporting																																						Investigative Reporting
																																																					70	Commentary																																																					Commentary
																																																					70	Criticism																					92																																Criticism
																																																														79	Feature Writing																								04										14										Feature Writing
																																																																				85	Explanatory Journalism											97	98	Explanatory Reporting																									Explanatory Reporting
																																																																				85	Specialized Reporting				90	91	Beat Reporting														06	07	Local Reporting																Local Reporting
																																																																																																							20				Audio Reporting
Letters • Drama • Music																																																																Letters • Drama • Music																																											
17	Biography or Autobiography																																												62																																																												22	23	Biography
17	Biography or Autobiography																																												62																																																												22	23	Memoir or Autobiography
17		19	History																																																																84										94																														History
																																													62	General Nonfiction																																																													General Nonfiction
17			20	Novel																				41					46	47	48	Fiction					54			57							64							71			74			77																																			12												Fiction
					22	Poetry																							46																																																																	Poetry													
17		19	Drama																						42		44			47				51												63	64		66		68				72		74												86											97									06																		Drama
																										43	Music									53											64	65																81																																											Music
Special Awards & Citations																																																																Special Awards & Citations																																											
							24						30								38			41			44	45		47				51	52	53					58						64														78																		96																							19	20	21	22		For journalism
	18	19																																						57			60	61												73				77	78						84								92														06	07																	For letters
																											44																														74		76						82			85													98	99							06	07	08		10									19					For music
																											44			47	48																												76											87																																					For service

Legend

Awarded, current category
Awarded, category renamed and is current category
Awarded, category no longer exists
Nominees selected but category was not awarded

Note: The Pulitzer Prize for Local Reporting was split into two categories in 1948 that still exist as Breaking News Reporting and Investigative Reporting. The Local Reporting category was revived in 2007 as a new category to replace the Beat Reporting category.

== Board ==
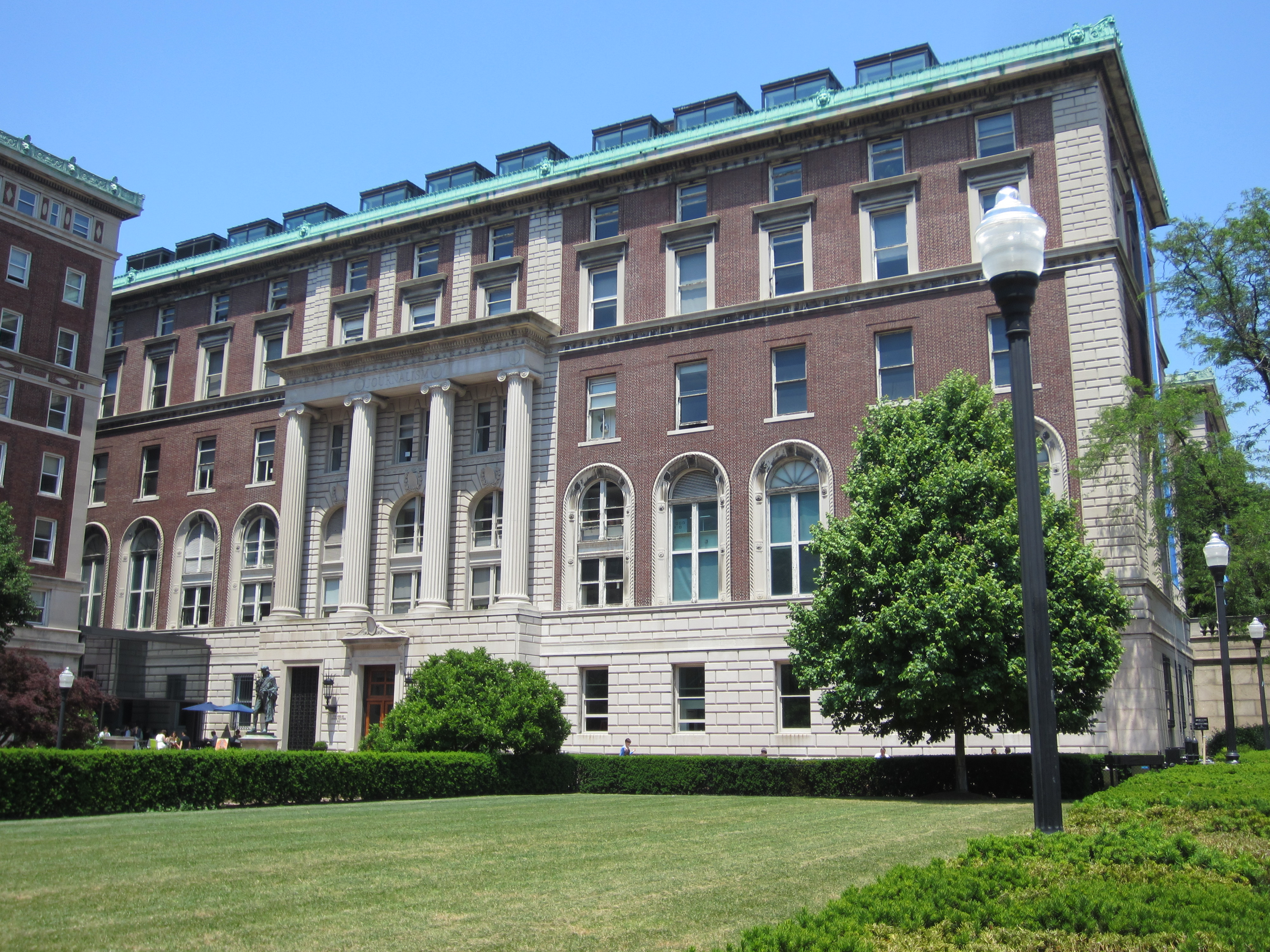
Pulitzer Hall on the campus of Columbia University in New York City

The nineteen-member Pulitzer Prize Board convenes semi-annually, traditionally in the Joseph Pulitzer World Room at Columbia University's Pulitzer Hall. It comprises major editors, columnists and media executives in addition to six members drawn from academia and the arts, including the president of Columbia University, the dean of the Columbia University Graduate School of Journalism and the administrator of the prizes, who serves as the board's secretary. The administrator and the dean (who served on the board from its inception until 1954 and beginning again in 1976) participate in the deliberations as ex officio members, but cannot vote. Aside from the president and dean (who serve as permanent members for the duration of their respective appointments) and the administrator (who is re-elected annually), the board elects its own members for a three-year term; members may serve a maximum of three terms. Members of the board and the juries are selected with close attention "given to professional excellence and affiliation, as well as diversity in terms of gender, ethnic background, geographical distribution and size of news organization."

Former Associated Press and Los Angeles Times editor Marjorie Miller was named administrator in April 2022. She succeeded former New York Times senior editor Dana Canedy, who served in the role from 2017 to 2020. Canedy was the first woman and first person of color to hold the position. Edward Kliment, the program's longtime deputy administrator, was appointed acting administrator in July 2020 when Canedy became senior vice president and publisher of Simon & Schuster's flagship eponymous imprint. He chose not to contend for the position and returned to his previous role upon Miller's appointment.

In addition to Canedy, past administrators include John Hohenberg (the youngest person to hold the position to date; 1954–1976), fellow Graduate School of Journalism professor Richard T. Baker (1976–1981), former Newsweek executive editor Robert Christopher (1981–1992), former New York Times managing editor Seymour Topping (1993–2002), former Milwaukee Journal editor Sig Gissler (2002–2014) and former Concord Monitor editor Mike Pride (the only former board member to hold the position to date; 2014–2017). Prior to the installation of Hohenberg, the program was jointly administered by members of the Journalism School's faculty (most notably longtime dean Carl W. Ackerman) and officials in Columbia's central administration, with the latter primarily under the aegis of Frank D. Fackenthal.

Following the retirement of Joseph Pulitzer Jr. (a grandson of the endower who served as permanent chair of the board for 31 years) in 1986, the chair has typically rotated to the most senior member (or members, in the case of concurrent elections) on an annual basis.

Since 1975, the board has made all prize decisions; prior to this point, the board's recommendations were subsequently ratified by a majority vote of the Trustees of Columbia University. Although the administrator's office and staff are housed alongside the Graduate School of Journalism at Columbia's Pulitzer Hall and several administrators have held concurrent full-time or adjunct faculty appointments at the Journalism School, the board and administration have been operationally separate from the school since 1950.

== Controversies ==
- 1921 Fiction Prize: Columbia trustees overruled jury recommendation and awarded the prize to Edith Wharton for The Age of Innocence instead of the recommendation of Sinclair Lewis for Main Street.
- Call for revocation of journalist Walter Duranty's 1932 Pulitzer Prize.
- 1941 Novel Prize: The advisory board elected to overrule the jury and recommended For Whom the Bell Tolls by Ernest Hemingway. However, Columbia University president Nicholas Murray Butler implored the committee to reconsider, citing the potential association between the university and the novel's frank sexual content; instead, no award was given. Twelve years later, Hemingway was awarded the 1953 Fiction Prize for The Old Man and the Sea.
- 1957 Biography Prize: The purported writer of Profiles in Courage, U.S. Senator John F. Kennedy, was believed to have had most of the book for which he received the Pulitzer Prize in Biography ghostwritten for him. Journalist Drew Pearson claimed on an episode of The Mike Wallace Interview which aired in December 1957 that "John F. Kennedy is the only man in history that I know who won a Pulitzer Prize for a book that was ghostwritten for him" and that his speechwriter Ted Sorensen was the book's actual author, though his claim later was retracted by the show's network, ABC, after Kennedy's father threatened to sue. Herbert Parmet also determined that the book was in fact mostly ghostwritten, writing in his 1980 book Jack: The Struggles of John F. Kennedy that although Kennedy did oversee the production and provided for the direction and message of the book, it was in fact Sorensen who provided most of the work that went into the end product. Sorenson himself would later admit in his 2008 autobiography, Counselor: A Life at the Edge of History, that he did in fact write "a first draft of most of the chapters" and "helped choose the words of many of its sentences". In addition to the ghostwriting controversy, it was also determined two of the eight U.S. Senators profiled in the book, Edmund G. Ross and Lucius Lamar, did not actually match what the book glorified them as.
- 1960 Fiction Prize: the jury committee recommended that the award be given to Saul Bellow's Henderson the Rain King, but the advisory board overrode that recommendation and awarded it to Allen Drury's Advise and Consent.
- 1962 Biography Prize: Citizen Hearst: A Biography of William Randolph Hearst by W. A. Swanberg was recommended by the jury and advisory board but overturned by the trustees of Columbia University (then charged with final ratification of the prizes) because its subject, Hearst, was not an "eminent example of the biographer's art as specified in the prize definition."
- 1963 Drama Prize: Who's Afraid of Virginia Woolf? by Edward Albee was selected by the drama jury, but the award's advisory board objected to its profanity and sexual themes and overruled the jury, awarding no Pulitzer Prize for drama in 1963.
- 1974 Fiction Prize: Gravity's Rainbow by Thomas Pynchon was recommended by the three-member fiction jury, but the advisory board overturned that decision and no award was given by the trustees.
- Shortly after receiving a Special Citation for Roots: The Saga of an American Family in the spring of 1977, Alex Haley was charged with plagiarism in separate lawsuits by Harold Courlander and Margaret Walker Alexander. Courlander, an anthropologist and novelist, charged that Roots was copied largely from his novel The African (1967). Walker claimed that Haley had plagiarized from her Civil War–era novel Jubilee (1966). Legal proceedings in each case were concluded late in 1978. Courlander's suit was settled out of court for $650,000 (equivalent to $3.2 million in 2025) and an acknowledgment from Haley that certain passages within Roots were copied from The African. Walker's case was dismissed by the court, which, in comparing the content of Roots with that of Jubilee, found that "no actionable similarities exist between the works."
- 1981 Feature Writing Prize: Washington Post staff writer Janet Cooke returned the award after an investigation by the newspaper found she fabricated her prize-winning story "Jimmy's World", a profile of an eight-year-old heroin addict in Washington, D.C.
- 1994 History Prize: Gerald Posner's Case Closed: Lee Harvey Oswald and the Assassination of JFK, Lawrence Friedman's Crime and Punishment in American History and Joel Williamson's William Faulkner and Southern History were nominated unanimously for the award; however, no award was given. The decision not to give an award to one of the three books created a public controversy. One of the 19 members of the Pulitzer Board, John Dotson, said that all of the three nominated books were "flawed in some way." But another board member, Edward Seaton, editor of The Manhattan Mercury, disagreed, saying it was "unfortunate" that no award had been given.
- 2010 Drama Prize: The Tony-winning musical Next to Normal received the award despite not having been among the jury-provided nominees.
- 2020 Feature Photography Prize: The citation to Channi Anand, Mukhtar Khan and Dar Yasin of the Associated Press caused controversy. It was taken by some as questioning "India's legitimacy over Kashmir" as it had used the word "independence" in regard to revocation of Article 370.
- 2020 Commentary Prize: An association of conservative scholars called for the revocation of Nikole Hannah-Jones' award for "The 1619 Project" after the New York Times substantially softened claims that the prime motivation behind the American Revolution was the preservation of slavery, following public criticism from historians. Leslie M. Harris, a fact checker for the project, wrote in a piece for Politico that she raised concerns with Hannah-Jones's "overstated claim" with Times editors prior to the project's publication. Harris stated that "the argument among historians, while real, is hardly black and white."
- 2020 International Reporting Prize: Russian journalist Roman Badanin, editor-in-chief of independent Russian media outlet Proekt (Project), said that at least two New York Times articles in the entry repeated findings of Proekt's articles published a few months before.

== Criticism and studies ==
Some critics of the Pulitzer Prize have accused the organization of favoring those who support liberal causes or oppose conservative causes. Conservative columnist L. Brent Bozell Jr. said that the Pulitzer Prize has a "liberal legacy", particularly in its prize for commentary. He pointed to a 31-year period in which only five conservatives won prizes for commentary. 2010 Pulitzer Prize winner for commentary Kathleen Parker wrote, "It's only because I'm a conservative basher that I'm now recognized." Alexander Theroux describes the Pulitzer Prize as "an eminently silly award, [that] has often been handed out as a result of pull and political log-rolling, and that to some of the biggest frauds and fools alike."

A 2012 academic study by journalism professors Yong Volz of the University of Missouri and Francis Lee of the Chinese University of Hong Kong found "that only 27% of Pulitzer winners since 1991 were females, while newsrooms are about 33% female." The researchers concluded female winners were more likely to have traditional academic experience, such as attendance at Ivy League schools, metropolitan upbringing, or employment with an elite publication such as The New York Times. The findings suggest a higher level of training and connectedness is required for a female applicant to be awarded the prize than male counterparts.

== See also ==
- Alfred I. duPont–Columbia University Award for broadcast journalism
- Commonwealth Writers Prize
- List of Pulitzer Prizes awarded to The New York Times
- List of prizes known as the Nobel or the highest honors of a field
- The Booker Prize
- Miguel de Cervantes Prize
- National Book Award
- National Magazine Awards
- Prix Goncourt
