= Cassandra Jaramillo =

Cassandra Jaramillo is an American journalist working for ProPublica. She is the 2025 winner of the Pulitzer Prize for Public Service and shared her award with her reporting team. They wrote about how state abortion bans affected women's health.

== Awards ==
In 2025, Jaramillo won the Pulitzer Prize for Public Service for the series Life of the Mother. She shared it with Kavitha Surana, Lizzie Presser, and Stacy Kranitz.
