= 1922 Pulitzer Prize =

Awards for journalism and related fields

The following are the Pulitzer Prizes for 1922.

== Journalism awards ==
- Public Service:
  - New York World, for articles exposing the operations of the Ku Klux Klan, published during September and October, 1921.
- Reporting:
  - Kirke L. Simpson of the Associated Press, for articles on the burial of the Unknown Soldier.
- Editorial Writing:
  - Frank M. O'Brien of the New York Herald, for an editorial entitled, "The Unknown Soldier".

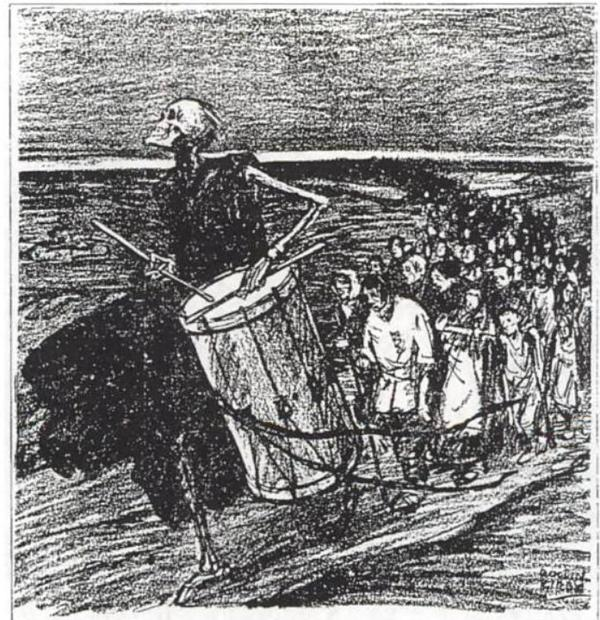
"On the Road to Moscow", the prize-winning editorial cartoon

- Editorial Cartooning:
  - Rollin Kirby of the New York World, for "On the Road to Moscow".

== Letters and Drama Awards ==
- Novel:
  - Alice Adams by Booth Tarkington (Doubleday)
- Drama:
  - Anna Christie by Eugene O'Neill
- History:
  - The Founding of New England by James Truslow Adams (Little)
- Biography or Autobiography:
  - A Daughter of the Middle Border by Hamlin Garland (Macmillan)
- Poetry:
  - Collected Poems by Edwin Arlington Robinson (Macmillan)
