= Pulitzer Prize for Correspondence =

Former American journalism award

The Pulitzer Prize for Correspondence was awarded from 1929 to 1947, when it was merged with the Telegraphic Reporting – International category into International Reporting.

== Winners ==
Year	Name(s)	Publication	Rationale
1929	Paul Scott Mowrer	Chicago Daily News	"for his coverage of international affairs including the Franco-British Naval Pact and Germany's campaign for revision of the Dawes Plan."
1930	Leland Stowe	New York Herald Tribune	"for the series of articles covering conferences on reparations and the establishment of the international bank."
1931	H. R. Knickerbocker	New York Post	"for a series of articles on the practical operation of the Five Year Plan in Russia."
1931	H. R. Knickerbocker	Public Ledger	"for a series of articles on the practical operation of the Five Year Plan in Russia."
1932	Walter Duranty	The New York Times	"for his series of dispatches on Russia specifically the working out of the Five Year Plan."
1932	Charlie Ross	St. Louis Post-Dispatch	"for his article entitled, 'The Country's Plight—What Can Be Done about It?,' a discussion of economic situation of the United States."
1933	Edgar Ansel Mowrer	Chicago Daily News	"for his day-by-day coverage and interpretation of the series of German political crises in 1932, beginning with the presidential election and the struggle of Adolf Hitler for public office."
1934	Frederick T. Birchall	The New York Times	"for his correspondence from Europe."
1935	Arthur Krock	The New York Times	"for his Washington dispatches."
1936	Wilfred Barber	Chicago Tribune	"for his reports of the war in Ethiopia." (Note: Posthumously.)
1937	Anne O'Hare McCormick	The New York Times	"for her dispatches and feature articles from Europe in 1936."
1938	Arthur Krock	The New York Times	"for his exclusive authorized interview with the President of the United States on February 27, 1937."
1939	Louis P. Lochner	Associated Press	"for his dispatches from Berlin."
1940	Otto D. Tolischus	The New York Times	"for his dispatches from Berlin."
1941	Group award		"In place of an individual Pulitzer Prize for foreign correspondence, the Trustees approved the recommendation of the Advisory Board that a bronze plaque or scroll be designed and executed to recognize and symbolize the public services and the individual achievements of American news reporters in the war zones of Europe, Asia and Africa from the beginning of the present war."
1942	Carlos P. Romulo	Philippines Herald	"for his observations and forecasts of Far Eastern developments during a tour of the trouble centers from Hong Kong to Batavia."
1943	Hanson W. Baldwin	The New York Times	"for his report of his wartime tour of the Southwest Pacific."
1944	Ernie Pyle	Scripps-Howard Newspapers	"for distinguished war correspondence during the year 1943."
1945	Hal Boyle	Associated Press	"for distinguished war correspondence during the year 1944."
1946	Arnaldo Cortesi	The New York Times	"for distinguished correspondence during the year 1945, as exemplified by his reports from Buenos Aires, Argentina."
1947	Brooks Atkinson	The New York Times	"for distinguished correspondence during 1946, as exemplified by his series of articles on Russia."
