= Nat S. Finney =

American journalist (1903–1982)

Nathan Solon Finney
- Born: October 10, 1903; Stewartville, Minnesota, U.S.
- Died: December 18, 1982 (aged 79)
- Education: University of Minnesota (B.A.)
- Occupation: Journalist
- Spouse: Flora Edwards (m. 1930–1971)
- Writing career
- Subjects: Economics, nuclear energy, atomic testing
- Notable awards: Pulitzer Prize for Telegraphic Reporting; 1948

Nathan Solon Finney (October 10, 1903 – December 18, 1982), who wrote under the name Nat S. Finney, was an American journalist. He spent long periods as a Washington correspondent for the Minneapolis Tribune and, later, the Buffalo Evening News. A specialist on economics and nuclear energy, he covered atomic tests in the Pacific, was the first journalist to visit Los Alamos National Laboratory, and was the first to report on Soviet missiles in Cuba.

In 1948, he won a Pulitzer Prize for National Reporting.

== Career ==
Born and raised in Stewartville, Minnesota, Finney received a B.A. degree from the University of Minnesota in 1927.

== Early life and education ==
He started his career in journalism in 1925 as a cub reporter for the Minneapolis Star. From 1929 to 1930, he worked for the publishing house Harcourt, Brace & Co. He then returned to the Star, becoming city editor of that paper. Later, he worked as feature and picture editor of the Minneapolis Star Journal.

Finney went to Washington, D.C., in 1941 to work as a correspondent for the Minneapolis Tribune and Look magazine. His articles for the Tribune were often reprinted in The Des Moines Register, among other places.

In 1950, he relocated to Minneapolis, where he became an editorial-page writer for The Minneapolis Star.

In 1953, he returned to Washington as a correspondent for The Buffalo Evening News. He remained there until his retirement in 1968.

In 1944, Finney was the only member of the Washington press corps to correctly predict the number of electoral votes that Franklin D. Roosevelt would receive in that year's election. In 1947, he filed "Assignment: Britain," a series of stories from Britain about that country's postwar problems.

He was the first newspaper reporter admitted to the formerly top secret atomic bomb laboratory at Los Alamos, New Mexico, the Los Alamos National Laboratory, in 1945. Later he covered atomic tests at Bikini Atoll in the South Pacific Ocean. He reported from the Atoms for Peace Conference in Geneva in 1955.

Finney was also the first newsman to report, on August 16, 1962, that the Soviet Union was placing missiles in Cuba. The report led to the historic confrontation between the Kennedy and Khrushchev governments that ended with the removal of the missiles. Later, while President Richard Nixon was visiting Moscow, Finney was one of two American reporters to be arrested by Soviet secret police. After Nixon intervened, Finney was released.

== Other professional activities ==
During the postwar years, Finney contributed several long-form articles to the Bulletin of the Atomic Scientists.

The April 1954 issue of the Bulletin of the Atomic Scientists included Finney's article "Atomic Dilemma." After more than a year in the White House, complained Finney, President Eisenhower had yet to make clear to the American public the extent of U.S. "atomic capabilities".

In September 1954, the Bulletin of the Atomic Scientists ran an article, "The Threat to Atomic Science," consisting of excerpts from several of Finney's recent pieces for the Buffalo News. Writing against the background of the Robert Oppenheimer case, which had resulted in the withdrawal of official security clearances from the scientist who had run the Los Alamos lab, Finney wrote about the often intense disagreements between atomic scientists and their military and government superiors about such matters as unclear or uncertain government objectives, the alleged "pampering" of certain prominent professors, poor coordination and communication, wasteful duplication of scientific efforts, and officials' desire for closer supervision of projects versus scientists' desire for greater independence.

Finney contributed an article, "A Reporter's Views on Atomic Secrecy," to the September 1955 issue of the Bulletin of the Atomic Scientists. "The time has come," he argued, "for the federal government generally and the Atomic Energy Commission specifically to shift from a negative to an affirmative information policy." Current policies, he suggested, had "stifled popular interest in and speculation about nuclear physics," thus stifling, in turn, "public understanding" of nuclear science. To be sure, the AEC had "done an excellent job helping the country's schools get up-to-date nuclear physics into their curricula." But too many scientists were still counterproductively critical of efforts to communicate the essence of their work in prose that would make it understandable and engaging to the lay readers. Finney proposed that the AEC employ three or four individuals capable of explaining new discoveries to general reporters in such a way that the latter could pass on important information to newspaper readers in cogent and comprehensible form.

On a 1959 episode of Face the Nation, Finney questioned Congressman Chet Holifield of the Joint Committee on Atomic Energy about the potential perils of nuclear testing.

In a 1965 issue of The Saturday Evening Post, Finney reviewed Senator Charles E. Potter's memoir Days of Shame, in which McCarthyism was a central topic. He called it "must reading" that added new details and provided insight into President Eisenhower's "perplexity".

== Honors and awards ==
In 1947, Finney won the Raymond Clapper Memorial Award for outstanding Washington reporting.

In 1948, during his tenure as a Washington reporter for The Minneapolis Tribune, Finney was one of two journalists to share the Pulitzer Prize for National Reporting. Finney's award was in recognition of "Move Seeks to Restore Wartime Gag," an account, published on October 19, 1947, of efforts by the Truman Administration to impose censorship on U.S. agencies during peacetime.

He was inducted into the Hall of Fame of the journalistic fraternity, Sigma Delta Chi, in 1975. Finney was president of the Gridiron Club in 1968. He also belonged to the National Press Club.

== Personal life ==
He was married for 41 years to Flora (Edwards) Finney, who died in 1971.
