= 1932 Pulitzer Prize =

Awards for journalism and related fields

The following are the Pulitzer Prizes for 1932 .

== Journalism awards ==
- Public Service:
  - Indianapolis News, for its successful campaign to eliminate waste in city management and to reduce the tax levy.
- Reporting:
  - W. C. Richards, D. D. Martin, J. S. Pooler, F. D. Webb and J. N. W. Sloan of the Detroit Free Press, for their account of the parade of the American Legion during the 1931 convention in Detroit.
  - Honorable mentions to:
    - Frank W. Griffin and Harry E. Kalodner of The Philadelphia Record, for "their series of articles exposing solicitors for charity funds who diverted to themselves a large part of the money collected by use of the Mayor's name. As a result of the exposé, the Mayor's committee was disbanded and an investigation begun by the District Attorney."
    - Harry Bloom and J. Howard Henderson of The Louisville Times, for "their exposé of frauds practiced by County Clerk W. G. Stiglitz on the State and on individual motorists in the collection of motor license taxes. Stiglitz resigned his office five hours after this story was published and less than four months later he began a five-year term in the penitentiary."
- Correspondence:
  - Charles G. Ross of the St. Louis Post-Dispatch, for his article entitled, "The Country's Plight—What Can Be Done About It?", a discussion of economic situation of the United States
  - Walter Duranty of The New York Times, for his series of dispatches on Russia specifically the working out of the Five Year Plan. This award has been controversial because of claims that Duranty lied about the famine in Ukraine. In 1990 and again in 2003, the Pulitzer administrators rejected calls to revoke Duranty's prize.
- Editorial Writing:
  - No award given

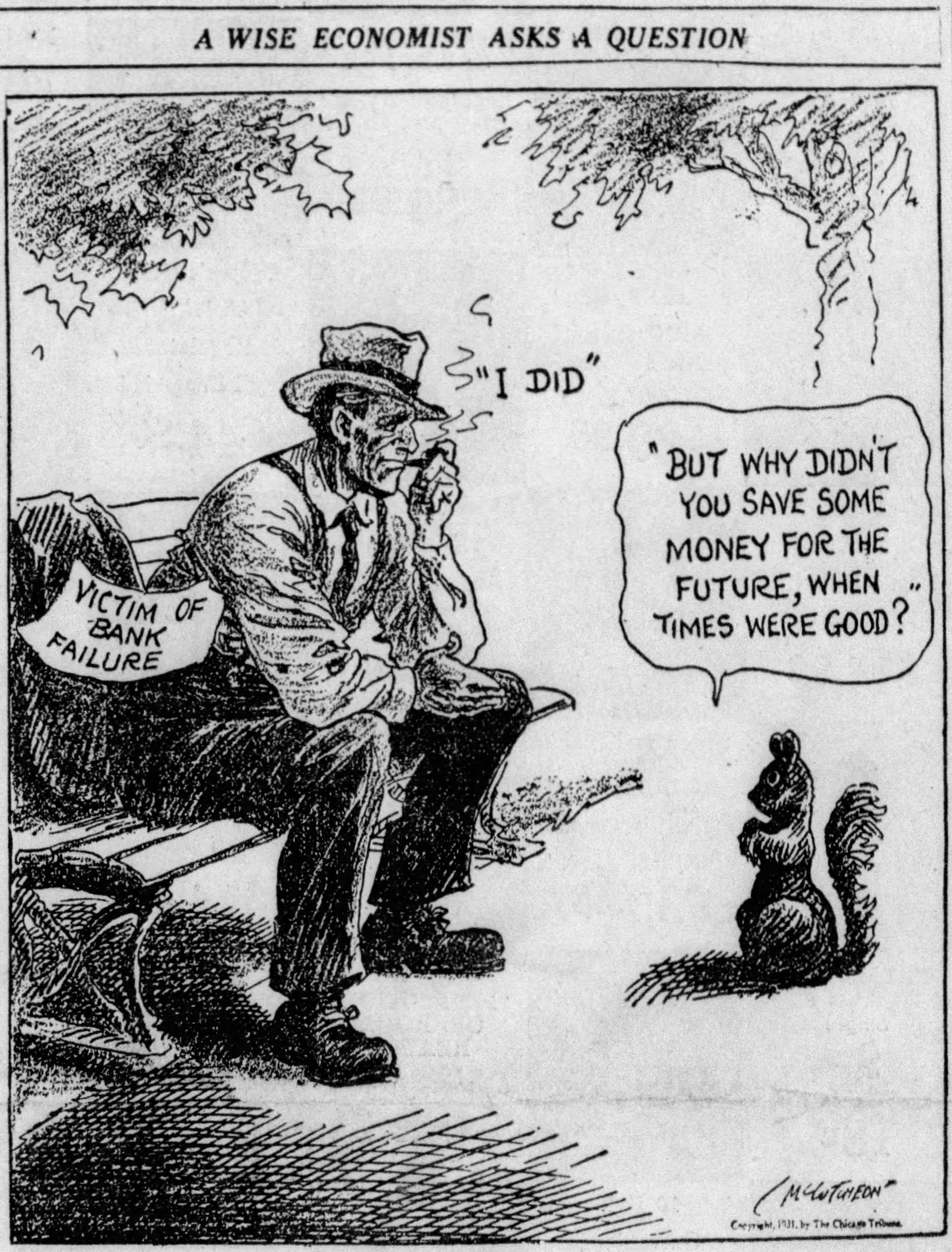
"A Wise Economist Asks a Question", the prize-winning editorial cartoon

- Editorial Cartooning:
  - John T. McCutcheon of the Chicago Tribune, for "A Wise Economist Asks a Question".

== Letters and Drama Awards ==
- Biography or Autobiography:
  - Theodore Roosevelt by Henry F. Pringle (Harcourt)
- Novel:
  - The Good Earth by Pearl S. Buck (John Day)
- Drama:
  - Of Thee I Sing by George S. Kaufman, Morrie Ryskind and Ira Gershwin (Knopf)
- History:
  - My Experiences in the World War by John J. Pershing (Stokes)
- Poetry:
  - The Flowering Stone by George Dillon (Viking)
