= 1948 Pulitzer Prize =

Awards for journalism and related fields

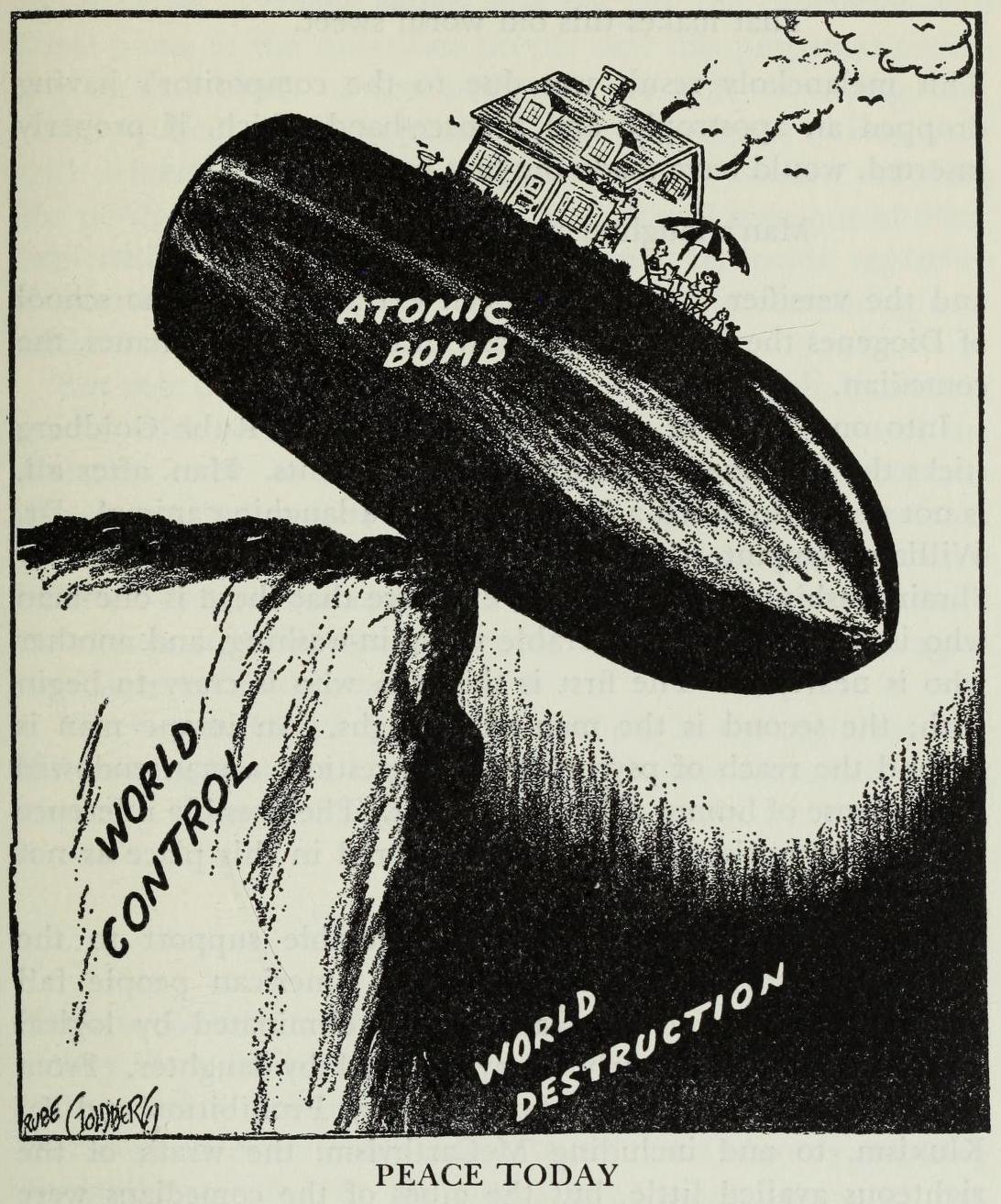
"Peace Today", the winning editorial cartoon

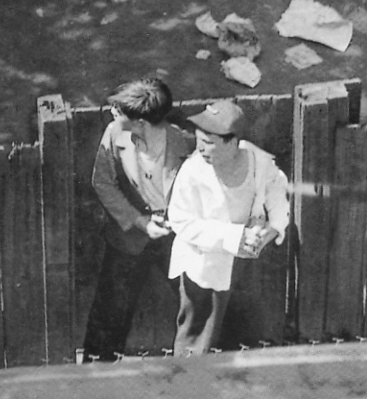
"Boy Gunman and Hostage", the winning photograph

The following are the Pulitzer Prizes for 1948.

== Journalism awards ==
- Public Service:
  - St. Louis Post-Dispatch for the coverage of the Centralia mine disaster in Illinois, and the follow-up which resulted in impressive reforms in mine safety laws and regulations.
- Local Reporting:
  - George E. Goodwin of the Atlanta Journal for his story of the Telfair County vote fraud, published in 1947.
- National Reporting:
  - Nat S. Finney of the Minneapolis Tribune for his stories on the plan of the Truman administration to impose secrecy about the ordinary affairs of federal civilian agencies in peacetime.
  - Bert Andrews of the New York Herald Tribune for his articles on "A State Department Security Case" published in 1947.
- International Reporting:
  - Paul W. Ward of The Baltimore Sun for his series of articles published in 1947 on "Life in the Soviet Union".
- Editorial Writing:
  - Virginius Dabney of the Richmond Times-Dispatch for distinguished editorial writing during the year.
- Editorial Cartooning:
  - Reuben Goldberg of the New York Sun for "Peace Today".
- Photography:
  - Frank Cushing of the Boston Traveler for his photo, "Boy Gunman and Hostage".

== Letters, Drama and Music Awards ==
- Fiction:
  - Tales of the South Pacific by James A. Michener (Macmillan).
- Drama:
  - A Streetcar Named Desire by Tennessee Williams (New Directions).
- History:
  - Across the Wide Missouri by Bernard De Voto (Harper).
- Biography or Autobiography:
  - Forgotten First Citizen: John Bigelow by Margaret Clapp (Little).
- Poetry:
  - The Age of Anxiety by W. H. Auden (Random).
- Music:
  - Symphony, No. 3 by Walter Piston first performed by the Boston Symphony Orchestra in Boston, January 1948.

== Special citations ==
- Frank D. Fackenthal, acting president of Columbia University, was awarded a scroll recognizing his years of service to the Pulitzer Prizes.
