= 1919 Pulitzer Prize =

Awards for journalism and related fields

The following are the Pulitzer Prizes for 1919.

== Journalism awards ==
- Public Service:
  - Milwaukee Journal, for its strong and courageous campaign for Americanism in a constituency where foreign elements made such a policy hazardous from a business point of view.
- Reporting:
  - No award given. The jury recommended the prize go to Philip Gibbs for his reporting of Allied fighting on the Western Front, but the Advisory Board declined to select a winner.
- Editorial Writing:
  - No award given. The jurors noted that editorials during the year were "chiefly devoted to inspiring the people and supporting the Government in the winning of the war", and determined that they could not "pick out any one article, or groups of articles, as clearly the best among the thousands directed to the same end with the same right-thinking zeal".

== Letters and Drama Awards ==
- Novel:
  - The Magnificent Ambersons by Booth Tarkington (Doubleday)
- Biography or Autobiography:
  - The Education of Henry Adams by Henry Adams (Houghton)

== Special Citations and Awards ==
These awards were made possible by a special grant from The Poetry Society.

- Poetry:
  - Cornhuskers by Carl Sandburg (Holt)
  - Old Road to Paradise by Margaret Widdemer (Holt)
