= 1936 Pulitzer Prize =

Awards for journalism and related fields

The following are the Pulitzer Prizes for 1936

== Journalism awards ==
- Public Service:
  - Cedar Rapids Gazette for its campaign against corruption and misgovernment in the State of Iowa.
  - Honorable mention to the St. Paul Daily News for its campaign against corruption and misgovernment in St. Paul.
- Reporting:
  - Lauren D. Lyman of The New York Times for the exclusive story revealing that the Charles Lindbergh family was leaving the United States to live in England.
- Correspondence:
  - Wilfred C. Barber of the Chicago Tribune for his reports of the Second Italo-Ethiopian War (posthumous).
  - Honorable mentions to:
    - Webb Miller of the United Press for reports on the Second Italo-Ethiopian War.
    - Ashman Brown of the Providence Evening Bulletin for his correspondence from Washington.
    - Jay G. Hayden of The Detroit News for a series of political articles written on a tour of the country.
    - James A. Mills of the Associated Press for his story about the leasing of Ethiopian oil fields to Standard Oil.
- Editorial Writing:
  - Felix Morley of The Washington Post for distinguished editorial writing during the year.
  - George B. Parker of Scripps-Howard Newspapers for distinguished editorial writing during the year.
- Editorial Cartooning:
  - No award given.

== Letters and Drama Awards ==
- Novel:
  - Honey in the Horn by Harold L. Davis (Harper).
- Drama:
  - Idiot's Delight by Robert E. Sherwood (Scribner).
- History:
  - A Constitutional History of the United States by Andrew C. McLaughlin (Appleton).
- Biography or Autobiography:
  - The Thought and Character of William James by Ralph Barton Perry (Little).
- Poetry:
  - Strange Holiness by Robert Peter Tristram Coffin (Macmillan).
