= Pulitzer Prize for Public Service =

American journalism award

The Pulitzer Prize for Public Service is one of the fourteen American Pulitzer Prizes annually awarded for journalism. It recognizes a distinguished example of meritorious public service by a newspaper or news site through the use of its journalistic resources, which may include editorials, cartoons, photographs, graphics, video and other online material, and may be presented in print or online or both.

The Public Service prize was one of the original Pulitzers, established in 1917, but no award was given that year. It is the only prize in the program that awards a gold medal and is the most prestigious one for a newspaper to win.

As with other Pulitzer Prizes, a committee of jurors narrows the field to three nominees, from which the Pulitzer Board generally picks a winner and finalists. Finalists have been made public since 1980. The Pulitzer Board issues an official citation explaining the reason for the award.

== Winners and citations ==
In its first 97 years to 2013, the Public Service Pulitzer was awarded 96 times. There were four years for which no award was given, and two prizes were awarded in the years 1967, 1990, and 2006. In 1950, 1951, 1953, 1955 and 1959, prizes were awarded to two newspapers. A reporter (rather than a publication) was first named in 1947; recently that has been more common and as many as five reporters have been named.

- 1917: no award given
- 1918: The New York Times, "for its public service in publishing in full so many official reports, documents and speeches by European statesmen relating to the progress and conduct of the war."
- 1919: Milwaukee Journal, "for its strong and courageous campaign for Americanism in a constituency where foreign elements made such a policy hazardous from a business point of view."
- 1920: no award given
- 1921: Boston Post, "for its exposure of the operations of Charles Ponzi by a series of articles which finally led to his arrest."
- 1922: New York World, "for articles exposing the operations of the Ku Klux Klan, published during September and October, 1921."
- 1923: Memphis Commercial Appeal, "for its courageous attitude in the publication of cartoons and the handling of news in reference to the operations of the Ku Klux Klan."
- 1924: New York World, "for its work in connection with the exposure of the Florida peonage evil," which helped bring an end to convict leasing in Florida
- 1925: no award given
- 1926: Columbus Enquirer Sun (Columbus, Georgia), "for the service which it rendered in its brave and energetic fight against the Ku Klux Klan; against the enactment of a law barring the teaching of evolution; against dishonest and incompetent public officials and for justice to the Negro and against lynching."
- 1927: Canton Daily News (Canton, Ohio), "for its brave, patriotic and effective fight for the ending of a vicious state of affairs brought about by collusion between city authorities and the criminal element, a fight which had a tragic result in the assassination of the editor of the paper, Mr. Don R. Mellett."
- 1928: Indianapolis Times, "for its work in exposing political corruption to Indiana, prosecuting the guilty and bringing about a more wholesome state of affairs in civil government."
- 1929: New York Evening World, "for its effective campaign to correct evils in the administration of justice, including the fight to curb 'ambulance chasers,' support of the 'fence' bill, and measures to simplify procedure, prevent perjury and eliminate politics from municipal courts; a campaign which has been instrumental in securing remedial action."
- 1930: no award given
- 1931: The Atlanta Constitution, "for a successful municipal graft exposure and consequent convictions."
- 1932: Indianapolis News, "for its successful campaign to eliminate waste in city management and to reduce the tax levy."
- 1933: New York World-Telegram, "for its series of articles on veterans relief, on the real estate bond evil, the campaign urging voters in the late New York City municipal election to "write in" the name of Joseph V. McKee, and the articles exposing the lottery schemes of various fraternal organizations."
- 1934: Medford Mail Tribune (Oregon), "for its campaign against unscrupulous politicians in Jackson County, Oregon."
- 1935: The Sacramento Bee, "for its campaign against political machine influence in the appointment of two Federal judges in Nevada."
- 1936: Cedar Rapids Gazette, "for its crusade against corruption and misgovernment in the State of Iowa."
- 1937: St. Louis Post-Dispatch, "for its exposure of wholesale fraudulent registration in St. Louis. By a coordinated news, editorial and cartoon campaign this newspaper succeeded in invalidating upwards of 40,000 fraudulent ballots in November and brought about the appointment of a new election board."
- 1938: Bismarck Tribune, "for its news reports and editorials entitled, 'Self Help in the Dust Bowl.'"
- 1939: Miami Daily News, "for its campaign for the recall of the Miami City Commission."
- 1940: Waterbury Republican & American (Connecticut), "for its campaign exposing municipal graft."
- 1941: St. Louis Post-Dispatch, "for its successful campaign against the city smoke nuisance."
- 1942: Los Angeles Times, "for its successful campaign which resulted in the clarification and confirmation for all American newspapers of the right of free press as guaranteed under the Constitution."
- 1943: Omaha World-Herald, "for its initiative and originality in planning a state-wide campaign for the collection of scrap metal for the war effort. The Nebraska plan was adopted on a national scale by the daily newspapers, resulting in a united effort which succeeded in supplying our war industries with necessary scrap material."
- 1944: New York Times, "for its survey of the teaching of American History."
- 1945: Detroit Free Press, "for its investigation of legislative graft and corruption at Lansing, Michigan."
- 1946: Scranton Times, "for its fifteen-year investigation of judicial practices in the United States District Court for the middle district of Pennsylvania, resulting in removal of the District Judge and indictment of many others."
- 1947: The Baltimore Sun, "for its series of articles by Howard M. Norton dealing with the administration of unemployment compensation in Maryland, resulting in convictions and pleas of guilty in criminal court of 93 persons."
- 1948: St. Louis Post-Dispatch, "for the coverage of the Centralia, Illinois, mine disaster and the follow-up which resulted in impressive reforms in mine safety laws and regulations."
- 1949: Nebraska State Journal, "for the campaign establishing the "Nebraska All-Star Primary" presidential preference primary which spotlighted, through a bi-partisan committee, issues early in the presidential campaign."
- 1950: Chicago Daily News and St. Louis Post-Dispatch, "for the work of George Thiem and Roy J. Harris, respectively, in exposing the presence of 37 Illinois newspapermen on an Illinois State payroll."
- 1951: The Miami Herald and Brooklyn Eagle, "for their crime reporting during the year."
- 1952: St. Louis Post-Dispatch, "for its investigation and disclosures of wide spread corruption in the Internal Revenue Bureau and other departments of the government."
- 1953: Whiteville News Reporter (North Carolina, semi-weekly) and Tabor City Tribune (NC, weekly), "for their successful campaign against the Ku Klux Klan, waged on their own doorstep at the risk of economic loss and personal danger, culminating in the conviction of over one hundred Klansmen and an end to terrorism in their communities."
- 1954: Newsday, "for its expose of New York State's race track scandals and labor racketeering, which led to the extortion indictment, guilty plea and imprisonment of William C. DeKoning, Sr., New York labor racketeer."
- 1955: Columbus Ledger and Sunday Ledger-Enquirer (Columbus, Georgia), "for its complete news coverage and fearless editorial attack on widespread corruption in neighboring Phenix City, Alabama, which were effective in destroying a corrupt and racket-ridden city government."
- 1956: Watsonville Register-Pajaronian (California), "for courageous exposure of corruption in public office, which led to the resignation of a district attorney and the conviction of one of his associates."
- 1957: Chicago Daily News, "for determined and courageous public service in exposing a $2,500,000 fraud centering in the office of the State Auditor of Illinois, resulting in the indictment and conviction of the State Auditor and others. This led to the reorganization of State procedures to prevent a recurrence of the fraud."
- 1958: Arkansas Gazette, "for demonstrating the highest qualities of civic leadership, journalistic responsibility and moral courage in the face of great public tension during the school integration crisis of 1957. "
- 1959: Utica Observer-Dispatch and Utica Daily Press (Utica, NY), "for their successful campaign against corruption, gambling and vice in their home city and the achievement of sweeping civic reforms in the face of political pressure and threats of violence."
- 1960: Los Angeles Times, "for its thorough, sustained and well-conceived attack on narcotics traffic and the enterprising reporting of Gene Sherman, which led to the opening of negotiations between the United States and Mexico to halt the flow of illegal drugs into southern California and other border states."
- 1961: Amarillo Globe-Times, "for exposing a breakdown in local law enforcement with resultant punitive action that swept lax officials from their posts and brought about the election of a reform slate. The newspaper thus exerted its civic leadership in the finest tradition of journalism."
- 1962: Panama City News-Herald, "for its three-year campaign against entrenched power and corruption, with resultant reforms in Panama City and Bay County."
- 1963: Chicago Daily News, "for calling public attention to the issue of providing birth control services in the public health programs in its area."
- 1964: St. Petersburg Times, "for its aggressive investigation of the Florida Turnpike Authority which disclosed widespread illegal acts and resulted in a major reorganization of the State's road construction program."
- 1965: Hutchinson News, "for its courageous and constructive campaign, culminating in 1964, to bring about more equitable reapportionment of the Kansas Legislature, despite powerful opposition in its own community."
- 1966: The Boston Globe, "for its campaign to prevent confirmation of Francis X. Morrissey [Sr.] as a Federal District Judge in Massachusetts."
- 1967: Milwaukee Journal, "for its successful campaign to stiffen the law against water pollution in Wisconsin, a notable advance in the national effort for the conservation of natural resources."
- 1967: The Courier-Journal (Louisville), for its successful campaign to control the Kentucky strip mining industry, a notable advance in the national effort for the conservation of natural resources.
- 1968: Riverside Press-Enterprise (California), "for its expose of corruption in the courts in connection with the handling of the property and estates of an Indian tribe in California, and its successful efforts to punish the culprits."
- 1969: Los Angeles Times, "for its expose of wrongdoing within the Los Angeles City Government Commissions, resulting in resignations or criminal convictions of certain members, as well as widespread reforms."
- 1970: Newsday, "for its three-year investigation and exposure of secret land deals in eastern Long Island, which led to a series of criminal convictions, discharges and resignations among public and political officeholders in the area."
- 1971: Winston-Salem Journal, "for coverage of environmental problems, as exemplified by a successful campaign to block strip mining operation that would have caused irreparable damage to the hill country of northwest North Carolina."
- 1972: The New York Times, "for the publication of the Pentagon Papers."
- 1973: The Washington Post, "for its investigation of the Watergate case."
- 1974: Newsday, "for its definitive report on the illicit narcotic traffic in the United States and abroad, entitled, 'The Heroin Trail.'"
- 1975: The Boston Globe, "for its massive coverage of the Boston school desegregation crisis."
- 1976: Anchorage Daily News, "for its disclosures of the impact and influence of the Teamsters Union on Alaska's economy and politics."
- 1977: Lufkin Daily News, "for an obituary of a local man who died in Marine training camp, which grew into an investigation of that death and a fundamental reform in the recruiting and training practices of the United States Marine Corps."
- 1978: The Philadelphia Inquirer, "for a series of articles showing abuses of power by the police in its home city."
- 1979: The Point Reyes Light (California, weekly), "for its investigation of Synanon."
- 1980: Gannett News Service, "for its series on financial contributions to the Pauline Fathers."
- 1981: Charlotte Observer, "for its series on 'Brown Lung: A Case of Deadly Neglect.'"
- 1982: Detroit News, "for a series by Sydney P. Freedberg and David Ashenfelter which exposed the U.S. Navy's cover-up of circumstances surrounding the deaths of seamen aboard ship and which led to significant reforms in naval procedures."
- 1983: Jackson Clarion-Ledger, "for its successful campaign supporting Governor Winter in his legislative battle for reform of Mississippi's public education system."
- 1984: Los Angeles Times, "for an in-depth examination of southern California's growing Latino community by a team of editors and reporters" called Latinos
- 1985: Fort Worth Star-Telegram, "for reporting by Mark Thompson (reporter) which revealed that nearly 250 U.S. servicemen had lost their lives as a result of a design problem in helicopters built by Bell Helicopter - a revelation which ultimately led the Army to ground almost 600 Huey helicopters pending their modification."
- 1986: The Denver Post, "for its in-depth study of "missing children", which revealed that most are involved in custody disputes or are runaways, and which helped mitigate national fears stirred by exaggerated statistics."
- 1987: Pittsburgh Press, "for reporting by Andrew Schneider and Matthew Brelis which revealed the inadequacy of the FAA's medical screening of airline pilots and led to significant reforms."
- 1988: Charlotte Observer, "for revealing misuse of funds by the PTL television ministry through persistent coverage conducted in the face of a massive campaign by PTL to discredit the newspaper."
- 1989: Anchorage Daily News, "for reporting about the high incidence of alcoholism and suicide among Alaska Natives in a series that focused attention on their despair and resulted in various reforms."
- 1990: Washington Daily News (Washington, North Carolina), "for revealing that the city's water supply was contaminated with carcinogens, a problem that the local government had neither disclosed nor corrected over a period of eight years."
- 1990: The Philadelphia Inquirer, "for reporting by Gilbert M. Gaul that disclosed how the American blood industry operates with little government regulation or supervision."
- 1991: Des Moines Register, for reporting by Jane Schorer for publishing a story regarding Nancy Ziegenmeyer, a woman who had been raped. Ziegenmeyer consented to the publication of her name. The story prompted widespread reconsideration of the traditional media practice of concealing the identity of rape victims.
- 1992: The Sacramento Bee, "for 'The Sierra in Peril,' reporting by Tom Knudson that examined environmental threats and damage to the Sierra Nevada mountain range in California."
- 1993: The Miami Herald, "for coverage that not only helped readers cope with Hurricane Andrew's devastation but also showed how lax zoning, inspection and building codes had contributed to the destruction."
- 1994: Akron Beacon Journal, "for its broad examination of local racial attitudes and its subsequent effort to promote improved communication in the community."
- 1995: Virgin Islands Daily News, "for its disclosure of the links between the region's rampant crime rate and corruption in the local criminal justice system. The reporting, largely the work of Melvin Claxton, initiated political reforms."
- 1996: The News & Observer, "for the work of Melanie Sill, Pat Stith and Joby Warrick on the environmental and health risks of waste disposal systems used in North Carolina's growing hog industry."
- 1997: The Times-Picayune (New Orleans), "for its comprehensive series analyzing the conditions that threaten the world's supply of fish."
- 1998: Grand Forks Herald, "for its sustained and informative coverage, vividly illustrated with photographs, that helped hold its community together in the wake of flooding, a blizzard and a fire that devastated much of the city, including the newspaper plant itself."
- 1999: The Washington Post, "for its series that identified and analyzed patterns of reckless gunplay by city police officers who had little training or supervision."
- 2000: The Washington Post, "notably for the work of Katherine Boo that disclosed wretched neglect and abuse in the city's group homes for the mentally retarded, which forced officials to acknowledge the conditions and begin reforms."
- 2001: The Oregonian (Portland, OR), "for its detailed and unflinching examination of systematic problems within the United States Immigration and Naturalization Service, including harsh treatment of foreign nationals and other widespread abuses, which prompted various reforms."
- 2002: The New York Times, "for a special section published regularly after the September 11th terrorist attacks on America, which coherently and comprehensively covered the tragic events, profiled the victims, and tracked the developing story, locally and globally."
- 2003: The Boston Globe, "for its courageous, comprehensive coverage of sexual abuse by priests, an effort that pierced secrecy, stirred local, national and international reaction and produced changes in the Roman Catholic Church."
- 2004: The New York Times, "for the work of David Barstow and Lowell Bergman that relentlessly examined death and injury among American workers and exposed employers who break basic safety rules." (This was moved by the board from the Investigative Reporting category, where it was also entered.)
- 2005: Los Angeles Times, "for its courageous, exhaustively researched series exposing deadly medical problems and racial injustice at a major public hospital."
- 2006: Biloxi Sun Herald (Mississippi), "for its valorous and comprehensive coverage of Hurricane Katrina, providing a lifeline for devastated readers, in print and online, during their time of greatest need."
- 2006: The Times-Picayune (New Orleans), "for its heroic, multi-faceted coverage of Hurricane Katrina and its aftermath, making exceptional use of the newspaper's resources to serve an inundated city even after evacuation of the newspaper plant."
- 2007: The Wall Street Journal, "for its creative and comprehensive probe into backdated stock options for business executives that triggered investigations, the ouster of top officials and widespread change in corporate America."
- 2008: The Washington Post, "For the work of Dana Priest, Anne Hull and photographer Michel du Cille in exposing mistreatment of wounded veterans at Walter Reed Hospital, evoking a national outcry and producing reforms by federal officials."
- 2009: Las Vegas Sun and notably Alexandra Berzon, "for the exposure of the high death rate among construction workers on the Las Vegas Strip amid lax enforcement of regulations, leading to changes in policy and improved safety conditions." Original series
- 2010: Bristol Herald Courier, "for the work of Daniel Gilbert in illuminating the murky mismanagement of natural-gas royalties owed to thousands of land owners in southwest Virginia, spurring remedial action by state lawmakers."
- 2011: Los Angeles Times, "for its exposure of corruption in the small California city of Bell where officials tapped the treasury to pay themselves exorbitant salaries, resulting in arrests and reforms."
- 2012: The Philadelphia Inquirer, "for its exploration of pervasive violence in the city's schools, using powerful print narratives and videos to illuminate crimes committed by children against children and to stir reforms to improve safety for teachers and students."
- 2013: South Florida Sun Sentinel "for its well documented investigation of off-duty police officers who recklessly speed and endanger the lives of citizens, leading to disciplinary action and other steps to curtail a deadly hazard."
- 2014: The Washington Post and The Guardian for their coverage of the National Security Agency's worldwide electronic surveillance program, and the leaking of documents pertaining to it by whistleblower Edward Snowden.
- 2015: The Post and Courier "for 'Till Death Do Us Part,' a riveting series that probed why South Carolina is among the deadliest states in the union for women and put the issue of what to do about it on the state's agenda."
- 2016: Associated Press, "for an investigation of severe labor abuses tied to the supply of seafood to American supermarkets and restaurants, reporting that freed 2,000 slaves, brought perpetrators to justice and inspired reforms."
- 2017: New York Daily News and ProPublica "for uncovering, primarily through the work of reporter Sarah Ryley, widespread abuse of eviction rules by the police to oust hundreds of people, most of them poor minorities."
- 2018: The New York Times and The New Yorker "for their coverage of the sexual abuse of women in Hollywood and other industries around the world".
- 2019: South Florida Sun Sentinel "for exposing failings by school and law enforcement officials before and after the deadly shooting rampage at Marjory Stoneman Douglas High School."
- 2020: Anchorage Daily News with contributions from ProPublica, for "a riveting series that revealed a third of Alaska's villages had no police protection, took authorities to task for decades of neglect, and spurred an influx of money and legislative changes."
- 2021: The New York Times, for coverage of the COVID-19 pandemic.
- 2022: The Washington Post, for reporting on the January 6 United States Capitol attack.
- 2023: Associated Press and Mstyslav Chernov, Evgeniy Maloletka, Vasilisa Stepanenko and Lori Hinnant for their "reporting from the besieged city of Mariupol that bore witness to the slaughter of civilians in Russia's invasion of Ukraine."
- 2024: ProPublica, "for the work of Joshua Kaplan, Justin Elliott, Brett Murphy, Alex Mierjeski and Kirsten Berg, groundbreaking and ambitious reporting that pierced the thick wall of secrecy surrounding the Supreme Court to reveal how a small group of politically influential billionaires wooed justices with lavish gifts and travel, pushing the court to adopt its first code of conduct."
- 2025: ProPublica, "for urgent reporting by Kavitha Surana, Lizzie Presser, Cassandra Jaramillo and Stacy Kranitz about pregnant women who died after doctors delayed urgently needed care for fear of violating vague 'life of the mother' exceptions in states with strict abortion laws."
- 2026: The Washington Post, "for piercing the veil of secrecy around the Trump administration's chaotic overhaul of federal agencies and chronicling in rich detail the human impacts of the cuts and the consequences for the country."
