= 1941 Pulitzer Prize =

Awards for journalism and related fields

The following are the Pulitzer Prizes for 1941.

== Journalism awards ==
- Public Service:
  - St. Louis Post-Dispatch for its successful campaign against the city smoke nuisance.
- Reporting:
  - Westbrook Pegler of the New York World-Telegram for his articles on scandals in the ranks of organized labor, which led to the exposure and conviction of George Scalise, a labor racketeer.
- Correspondence:
  - In place of an individual Pulitzer Prize for foreign correspondence, the Trustees approved the recommendation of the advisory board that a bronze plaque or scroll be designed and executed to recognize and symbolize the public services and the individual achievements of American news reporters in the war zones of Europe, Asia and Africa from the beginning of the present war.
- Editorial Writing:
  - Reuben Maury of the New York Daily News for his distinguished editorial writing during the year.

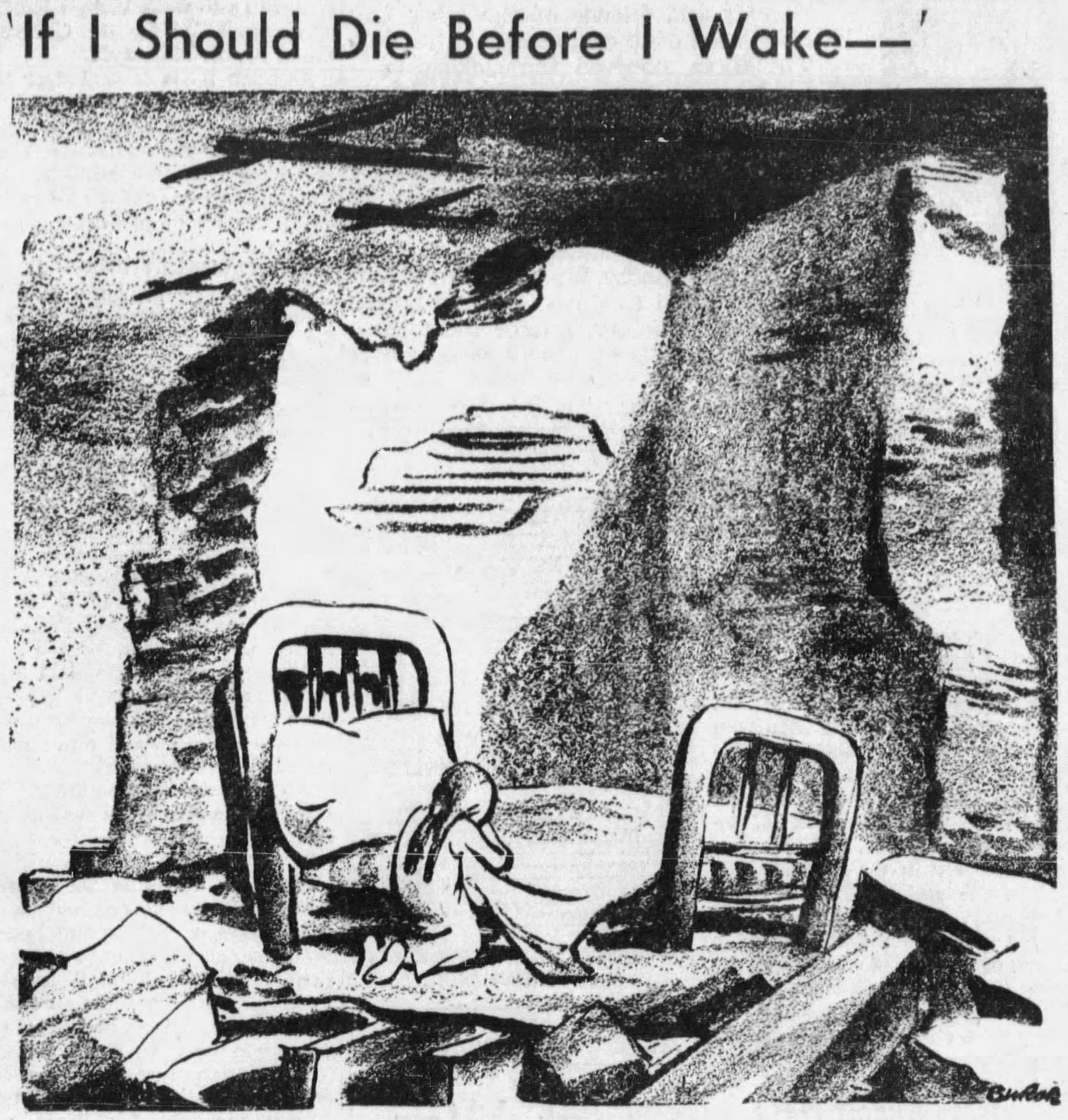
"If I Should Die Before I Wake", the prize-winning editorial cartoon

- Editorial Cartooning:
  - Jacob Burck of the Chicago Daily Times for "If I Should Die Before I Wake".
- Special Citation:
  - The New York Times for the public educational value of its foreign news report, exemplified by its scope, by excellence of writing and presentation, and supplementary background information, illustration, and interpretation.

== Letters and Drama Awards ==
- Novel:
  - No award given.
- Drama:
  - There Shall Be No Night by Robert E. Sherwood (Scribner).
- History:
  - The Atlantic Migration, 1607-1860 by Marcus Lee Hansen (Harvard Univ. Press).
- Biography or Autobiography:
  - Jonathan Edwards by Ola Elizabeth Winslow (Macmilllan).
- Poetry:
  - Sunderland Capture by Leonard Bacon (Harper).
