= Cyrus Sulzberger =

Cyrus Sulzberger may refer to:

- Cyrus Leopold Sulzberger (or Cyrus Lindauer Sulzberger; 1858–1932), American merchant and philanthropist
- C. L. Sulzberger (Cyrus Leo Sulzberger II, 1912–1993), American journalist, diarist, and non-fiction writer
