= 1923 Pulitzer Prize =

Awards for journalism and related fields

The following are the Pulitzer Prizes for 1923.

== Journalism awards ==
- Public Service:
  - Memphis Commercial Appeal, for its courageous attitude in the publication of cartoons and the handling of news in reference to the operations of the Ku Klux Klan.
- Reporting:
  - Alva Johnston of The New York Times, for his reports of the proceedings of the convention of the American Association for the Advancement of Science held in Cambridge Mass., in December, 1922.
- Editorial Writing:
  - William Allen White of The Emporia Gazette (Kansas), for an editorial entitled "To an Anxious Friend".

== Letters and Drama Awards ==
- Novel:
  - One of Ours by Willa Cather (Knopf)
- Drama:
  - Icebound by Owen Davis (Little)
- History:
  - The Supreme Court in United States History by Charles Warren (Little)
- Biography or autobiography:
  - The Life and Letters of Walter H. Page by Burton J. Hendrick (Houghton)
- Poetry:
  - "The Ballad of the Harp-Weaver", A Few Figs from Thistles, and "Eight Sonnets", by Edna St. Vincent Millay (Harper)
