= My Experiences in the World War =

Memoir of John J. Pershing

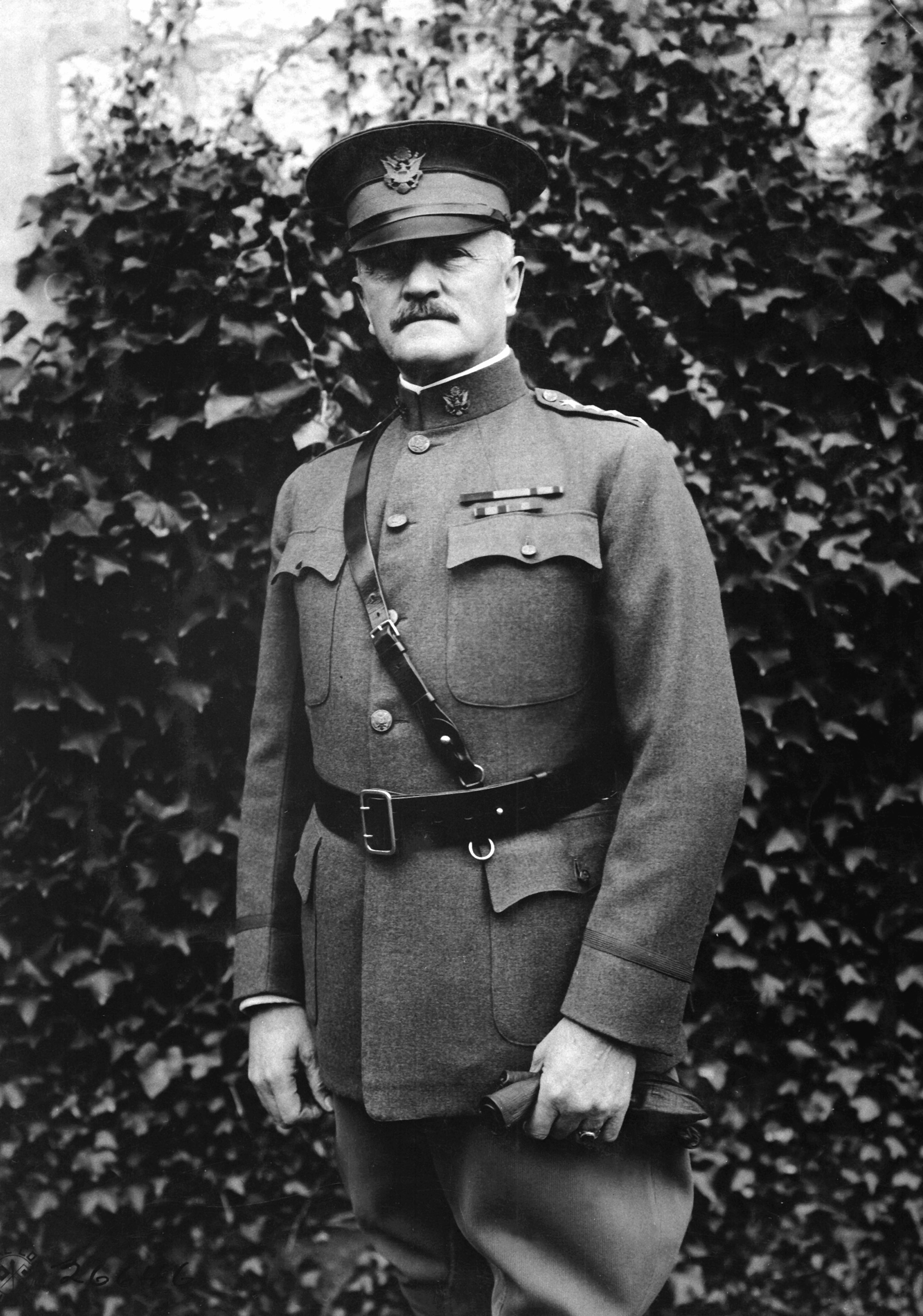
General John Pershing 1918

My Experiences in the World War is the memoir of General of the Armies John J. Pershing experiences in World War I.

Pershing's memoir covers two volumes. They were originally published by the Frederick A. Stokes Company of New York City, and released in 1931. Pershing dedicated the work to The Unknown Soldier.

Volume I covers the period from Pershing's selection as commander of the American Expeditionary Forces (AEF) in May 1917, to the German spring offensive, which began in March 1918. In the second volume, Pershing covers the period from the Allied cooperation that began at the end of the spring offensive until the November 14, 1918, Allied victory parade in Paris, three days after the armistice with Germany. Pershing's memoir also contains numerous photos, maps, tables of organization, and other illustrations.

My Experiences in the World War received the 1932 Pulitzer Prize for History.
