= Brooks Atkinson =

American theatre critic (1894–1984)

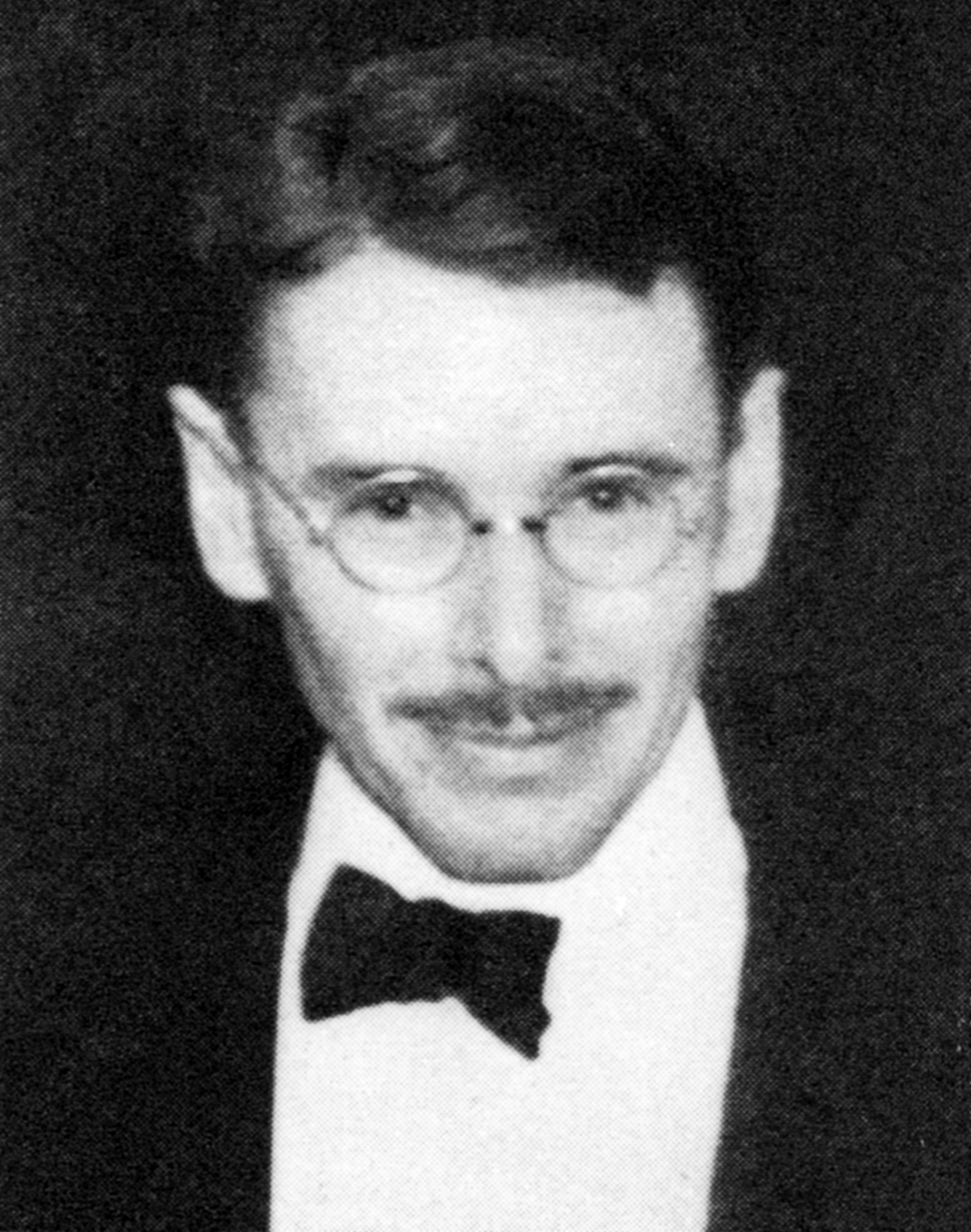
- Brooks Atkinson in 1938
- Born: Justin Brooks Atkinson; November 28, 1894; Melrose, Massachusetts, U.S.
- Died: January 14, 1984 (aged 89); Huntsville, Alabama, U.S.
- Occupations: theater critic, war correspondent
- Years active: 1925–1960
- Employer: The New York Times
- Known for: Pulitzer Prize for Correspondence

Justin Brooks Atkinson (November 28, 1894 – January 14, 1984) was an American theater critic. He worked for The New York Times from 1922 to 1960. In his obituary, the Times called him "the theater's most influential reviewer of his time." Atkinson became a Times theater critic in the 1920s and his reviews became very influential. He insisted on leaving the drama desk during World War II to report on the war, and received the Pulitzer Prize in 1947 for his work as the Moscow correspondent for the Times. He returned to the theater beat in the late 1940s, until his retirement in 1960.

== Biography ==
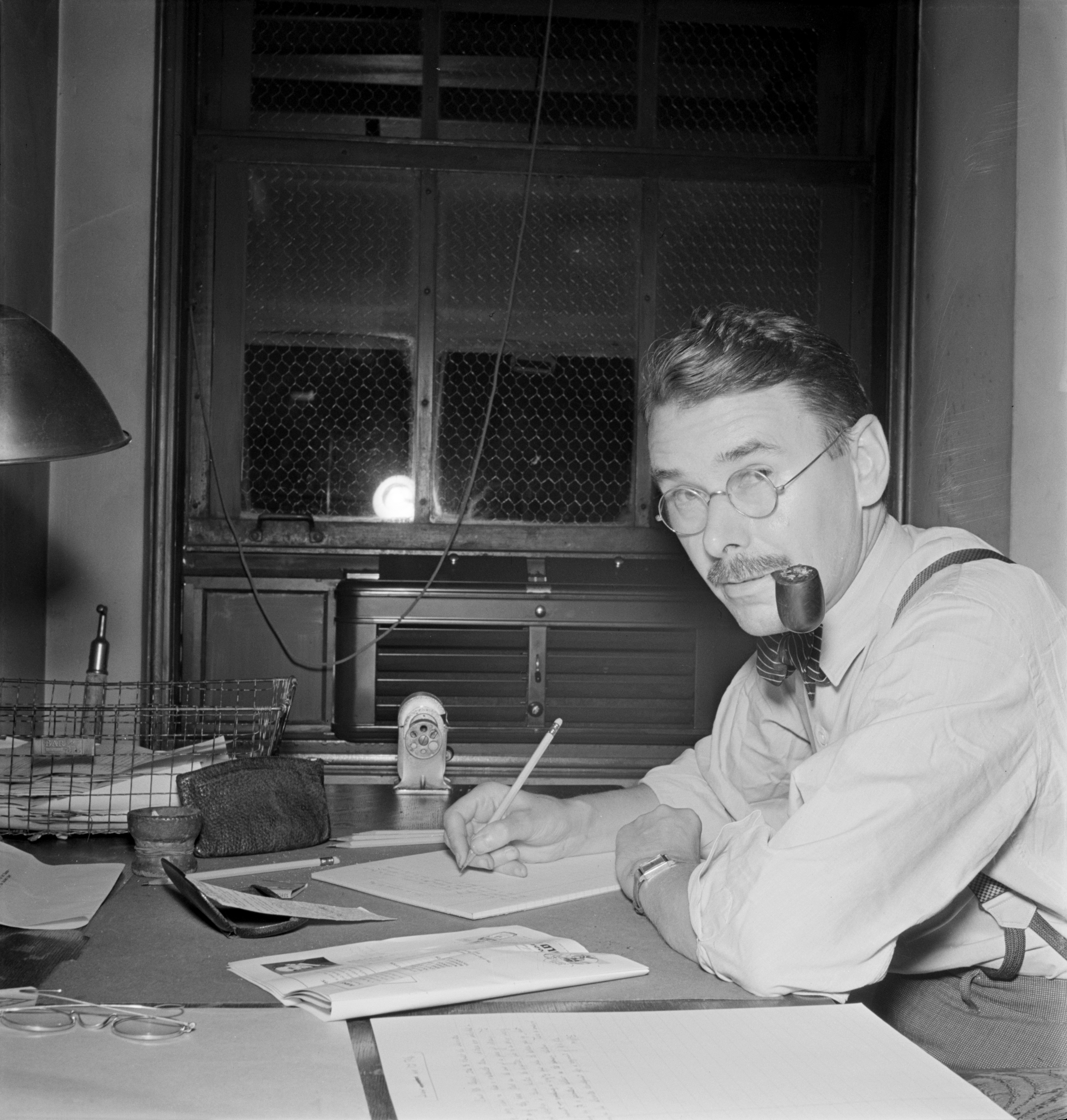
Atkinson in the drama department of The New York Times (September 1942)

Atkinson was born in Melrose, Massachusetts, to Jonathan H. Atkinson, a salesman statistician, and Garafelia Taylor. As a boy, he printed his own newspaper (using movable type), and planned a career in journalism. He attended Harvard University, where he began writing for the Boston Herald. He graduated from Harvard in 1917, and worked at the Springfield Daily News and the Boston Evening Transcript, where he was assistant to the drama critic. In 1922, he became the editor of the New York Times Book Review, and in 1925 the drama critic. Atkinson married Oriana MacIlveen, a writer, in August 1926.

On the drama desk, Atkinson quickly became known for his commitment to new kinds of theater (he was one of the first critical admirers of Eugene O'Neill) for his interest in all kinds of drama, including off-Broadway productions. In 1928, he said admiringly about the realism of the new play The Front Page, "No one who has ground his heels in the grime of a police headquarters press room will complain that this argot misrepresents the gentlemen of the press." In 1932 Atkinson dropped the J. from his byline and embraced the witty, direct writing style that became his hallmark.

Atkinson, stepping into the role of major progressive thinker and writer of his time, was a strong supporter of the Works Progress Administration, particularly the new Federal Theatre Project, Roosevelt's attempt in the midst of the unemployment and poverty of the Great Depression to extend welfare support to out of work theater professionals and to create a theater responsive to the American public in range and diversity. Atkinson travelled extensively to see productions such as the Harlem "Voodoo Macbeth," directed by the 21-year-old Orson Welles; the collaborative historical play "Lost Colony," staged on Roanoke Island in North Carolina; and openings of interesting plays all up and down the East Coast.

His reviews were reputed to have the power to make or break a new stage production: for example, his panning in 1940 of Lawrence Riley's Return Engagement led to that comedy's closure after only eight performances, despite the success of Riley's previous comedy, Personal Appearance, which had lasted for over 500 performances on Broadway. Atkinson had already been dubbed "the conscience of the theater" because of his openness to earnest experimental theater, his sense of duty toward supporting theater that addressed important moral and social issues of the day, and his firm conviction that theater could educate and foment serious public debate, but he was often not comfortable with the influence that he wielded over the Broadway box office.

After Japan's attack on Pearl Harbor in December 1941, Atkinson attempted to enlist in the US Navy but was refused. He requested a reassignment to war coverage, and The New York Times sent him to the front lines as a war correspondent in China, where he covered the Second Sino-Japanese War until 1945. While in China, he visited Mao Zedong in Yan'an and was captivated by him. Atkinson wrote favorably about the Chinese Communist Party and against the Nationalist government of Chiang Kai-shek, which he saw as reactionary and corrupt. After visiting Yan'an, he wrote that the Communist movement's political system was best described as an "agrarian or peasant democracy, or as a farm labor party." Atkinson viewed the Chinese Communist Party as communist in name only and more democratic than totalitarian. The Times effusively titled his article Yenan, a Chinese Wonderland City.

After the end of the war, Atkinson stayed only briefly in New York before he was sent to the Soviet Union as a press correspondent in Moscow. His work there for the Times earned him a Pulitzer Prize for Correspondence in 1947. Upon his return to the United States, Atkinson was reassigned to the newspaper's drama desk, where he remained until his retirement in 1960. He is given much credit for the growth of Off-Broadway into a major theatrical force in the 1950s, and has been cited by many influential people in the theater as crucial to their careers. David Merrick's famous spoof ad for Subways Are For Sleeping—in which he hired seven ordinary New Yorkers who had the same names as prominent drama critics to praise his musical—had to wait for Atkinson's retirement, because Merrick could not find anyone with the right name. There was only one Brooks Atkinson in New York City.

Atkinson was elected a fellow of the American Academy of Arts and Sciences in 1960. He came briefly out of retirement in 1965 to write a favorable review of Man of La Mancha; his review was printed on the first page of the show's original souvenir program. After his retirement, he became a member of The Players who organized a tribute dinner for Atkinson's 80th birthday, which was attended by Arthur Miller, Elia Kazan, and other prominent actors and playwrights.

He died on January 14, 1984, at Crestwood Hospital in Huntsville, Alabama. Atkinson had moved to Huntsville from his farm in Durham, New York, in 1981 to be closer to his family.

== Publications ==
- Skyline Promenades, 1925
- Henry Thoreau, The Cosmic Yankee, 1927, 1981 reprint
- East of the Hudson, 1931
- The Cingalese Prince, 1934
- Once Around the Sun, 1951
- New Voices in American Theater, 1955
- Tuesdays and Fridays, 1963
- Broadway, 1970
- This Bright Land: A Personal View, 1972
- The Lively Years, 1920-1973, 1973

== Legacy ==
The Mansfield Theatre in New York was named Brooks Atkinson Theatre in his honor between 1960 and 2022.
