= Frederick T. Birchall =

English journalist and editor for The New York Times

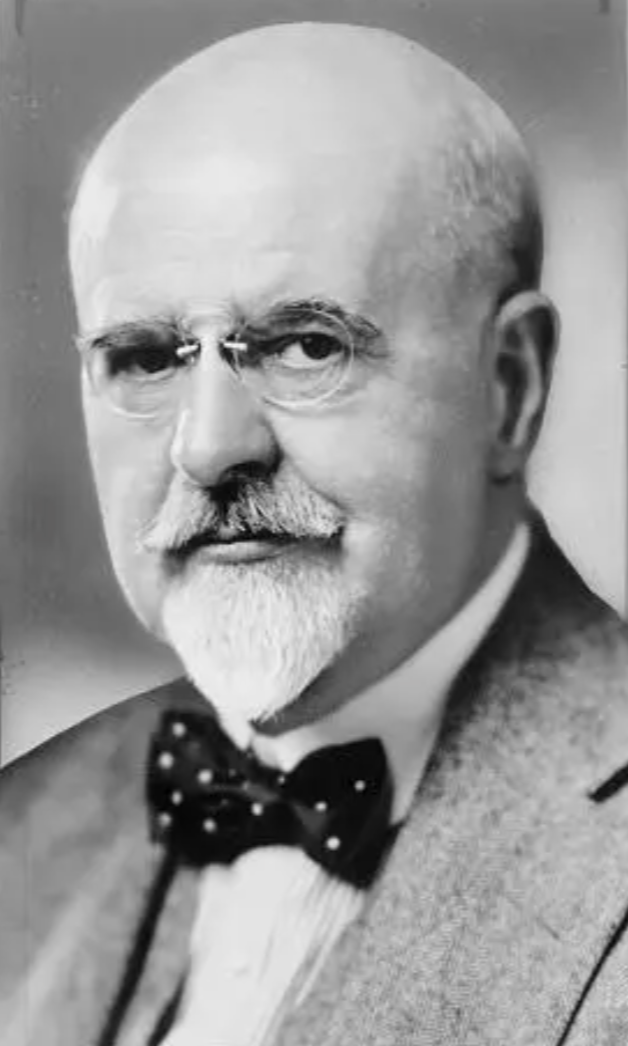
- Frederick T. Birchall, Managing Editor and chief European Correspondent for The New York Times in 1940
- Born: 1871; Warrington, England, UK
- Died: March 7, 1955 (aged 83–84); Bridgewater (near Petite Riviere), Nova Scotia, Canada
- Occupations: Journalist, editor, writer
- Employers: The Pall Mall Gazette; New-York Tribune; The New York Times
- Notable work: The Storm Breaks. A Panorama of Europe and the Forces that Have Wrecked Its Peace (1940)
- Spouse: Annie Hood Birchall
- Parents: Thomas Birchall (father); Elizabeth Birchall (mother)
- Awards: Pulitzer Prize for Correspondence for reporting from Europe (1934)

Frederick Thomas Birchall (1871 – March 7, 1955) was an English journalist and editor for The New York Times and winner of the 1933 Pulitzer Prize for Correspondence for his reporting from Europe at the time of the rise of National Socialism in Germany. For 27 years, Birchall was one of the chief news executives of The New York Times. He is also known for his book The Storm Breaks. A Panorama of Europe and the Forces that Have Wrecked Its Peace (1940).

== Early life ==
Birchall was born in 1871 in Warrington, Southern Lancashire, England. He was the only son of Thomas and Elizabeth Birchall. Warrington, a manufacturing town, was home to a family deeply engaged in the community. His father, Thomas Birchall, was an advocate of Gladstonian liberalism and a key figure in the British Cooperative Movement, with his contributions commemorated in the Memorial Hall of Warrington. Frederick Birchall had at least two sisters, Elizabeth A. and Edith J.

Educated in Lancashire schools, Birchall initially pursued higher education but left college upon realizing that his family intended for him to enter the ministry. Opting instead for a career in journalism, he began as a volunteer reporter for a local newspaper. Over time, he worked for various English newspapers, including The Pall Mall Gazette.

== Career ==
=== New York ===
Birchall moved to the United States in 1893. He started with a work for a news bureau covering the New York police headquarters. Later he took a job of the copy editor at the New-York Tribune. After that, Birchall became assistant city editor of the Morning Sun.

For 27 years, Birchall was one of the chief news executives of The New York Times. He joined The New York Times in 1905 as night city editor. In 1912 he moved to an assistant managing editor.

In 1926, when Carr Van Anda retired, Birchall was promoted to acting managing editor and stayed in the latter role until 1931.

After a brief break, Birchall returned to The New York Times in 1932 and agreed to be sent abroad and take charge of the entire European news service for the newspaper. From 1932 to 1939 Birchall worked as a manager of the European service. He was attached to no one bureau and moved to Europe following the most important international developments. Birchall's reputation as a tough observer of Germany grew rapidly. His series of stories on the European political situation, covering particularly the rise of Nazism, won him the Pulitzer Prize for foreign correspondence in 1933.

=== Works ===
- 1940: The Storm Breaks. A Panorama of Europe and the Forces that Have Wrecked Its Peace (The Viking Press)

== Death ==
Birchall died on March 7, 1955 in the Dawson Memorial Hospital, Bridgewater (N.S., Canada), just a couple of weeks after attending his wife's funeral in New York.

== See also ==
- Carr Van Anda
