= Arnaldo Cortesi =

American journalist and foreign correspondent

- Born: 21 September 1897; Rome, Italy
- Died: 26 November 1966 (aged 69)
- Education: Sherborne School; University of Birmingham
- Occupation: Journalist
- Years active: 1920s–1963
- Employer: The New York Times
- Known for: Foreign correspondence; Pulitzer Prize–winning reporting

Arnaldo Cortesi (21 September 1897 – 26 November 1966) was an American journalist and foreign correspondent for The New York Times. He won the 1946 Pulitzer Prize for Correspondence for his reporting from Buenos Aires during 1945, which the Pulitzer Board cited as distinguished foreign correspondence.

== Early life and education ==
Arnaldo Cortesi was born in Rome in 1897. He was educated in England and attended Sherborne School. He later studied engineering at the University of Birmingham and, after graduating, worked briefly for the British Westinghouse Electrical and Manufacturing Company at Trafford Park in Manchester.

== Career ==
=== Entry into journalism ===
Cortesi subsequently entered journalism and joined The New York Times, beginning a career that would span more than four decades. He served as a foreign correspondent in several countries, primarily in Europe and Latin America.

=== Rome and Fascist Italy ===
During the 1920s and 1930s, Cortesi was based in Rome as a correspondent for The New York Times. His reporting covered Italian political life during the rise and consolidation of Benito Mussolini’s Fascist regime. Contemporary accounts describe the working conditions of American correspondents in Fascist Italy as constrained by state censorship, requiring caution in reporting sensitive political developments.

In the late 1930s, following Italian government restrictions on the employment of Italian nationals by foreign newspapers, Cortesi left Rome and was reassigned to other foreign postings.

=== Buenos Aires and Pulitzer Prize ===
During the Second World War, Cortesi was posted to Buenos Aires, where he reported on Argentine politics and foreign relations in 1945, a period marked by the rise of Juan Perón. His reporting from Argentina formed the basis of his receipt of the Pulitzer Prize the following year.

In 1946, Cortesi was awarded the Pulitzer Prize for Correspondence for distinguished foreign reporting, with the Pulitzer Board citing his Buenos Aires dispatches as exemplars of high-quality international journalism.

=== Post-war Italy and later career ===
After the war, Cortesi returned to Italy and served as The New York Times Rome bureau chief during the post-war reconstruction period. His reporting covered the fall of Fascism, the Allied occupation, and the early political development of the Italian Republic.

According to his obituary in The New York Times, Cortesi’s foreign assignments over the course of his career also included postings in Geneva and Mexico City. He retired from active reporting in 1963.

== Pulitzer Prize ==
Cortesi received the Pulitzer Prize for Correspondence in 1946 for his foreign reporting during 1945. The award recognised his coverage of political developments in Argentina during a critical period in the country’s modern history.

== Death ==
Arnaldo Cortesi died on 26 November 1966 at the age of 69.
