= 1974 Pulitzer Prize =

Awards for journalism and related fields

The following are the Pulitzer Prizes for 1974.

== Journalism awards ==
- Public Service:
  - Newsday, Garden City, New York, for its definitive report on the illicit narcotic traffic in the United States and abroad, entitled, The Heroin Trail.
- Local General or Spot News Reporting:
  - Arthur M. Petacque and Hugh F. Hough of the Chicago Sun-Times, for uncovering new evidence that led to the reopening of efforts to solve the 1966 murder of Valerie Percy.
- Local Investigative Specialized Reporting:
  - William Sherman of the New York Daily News, for his resourceful investigative reporting in the exposure of extreme abuse of the New York Medicaid program.
- National Reporting:
  - Jack White of The Providence Journal and Evening Bulletin, for his initiative in exclusively disclosing President Nixon's Federal income tax payments in 1970 and 1971.
- National Reporting:
  - James R. Polk of the Washington Star-News, for his disclosure of alleged irregularities in the financing of the campaign to re-elect President Nixon in 1972.

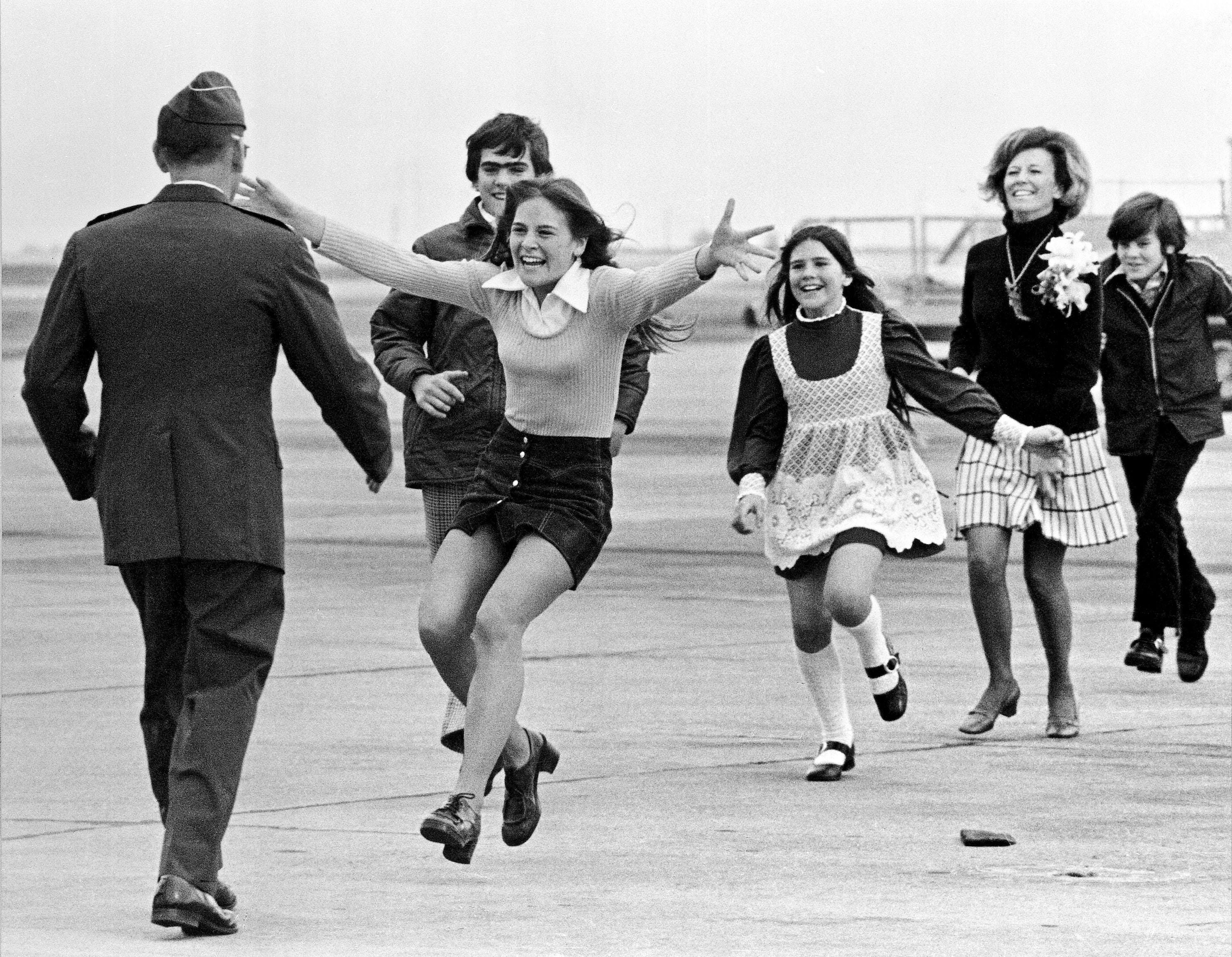
Burst of Joy, the prize-winning feature photograph

- International Reporting:
  - Hedrick Smith of The New York Times, for his coverage of the Soviet Union and its allies in Eastern Europe in 1973.
- Commentary:
  - Edwin A. Roberts Jr. of the National Observer, for his commentary on public affairs during 1973.
- Criticism:
  - Emily Genauer of Newsday Syndicate, for her critical writing about art and artists.
- Editorial Writing:
  - F. Gilman Spencer, editor of the Trentonian of Trenton, New Jersey, for his courageous campaign to focus public attention on scandals in New Jersey's state government.
- Editorial Cartooning:
  - Paul Szep of The Boston Globe, for his editorial cartooning during 1973.
- Feature Photography:
  - Slava "Sal" Veder of Associated Press, for his picture Burst of Joy, which illustrated the return of an American prisoner of war from captivity in North Vietnam.
- Spot News Photography:
  - Anthony K. Roberts, a free-lance photographer of Beverly Hills, California, for his picture series, Fatal Hollywood Drama, in which an alleged kidnapper was killed.
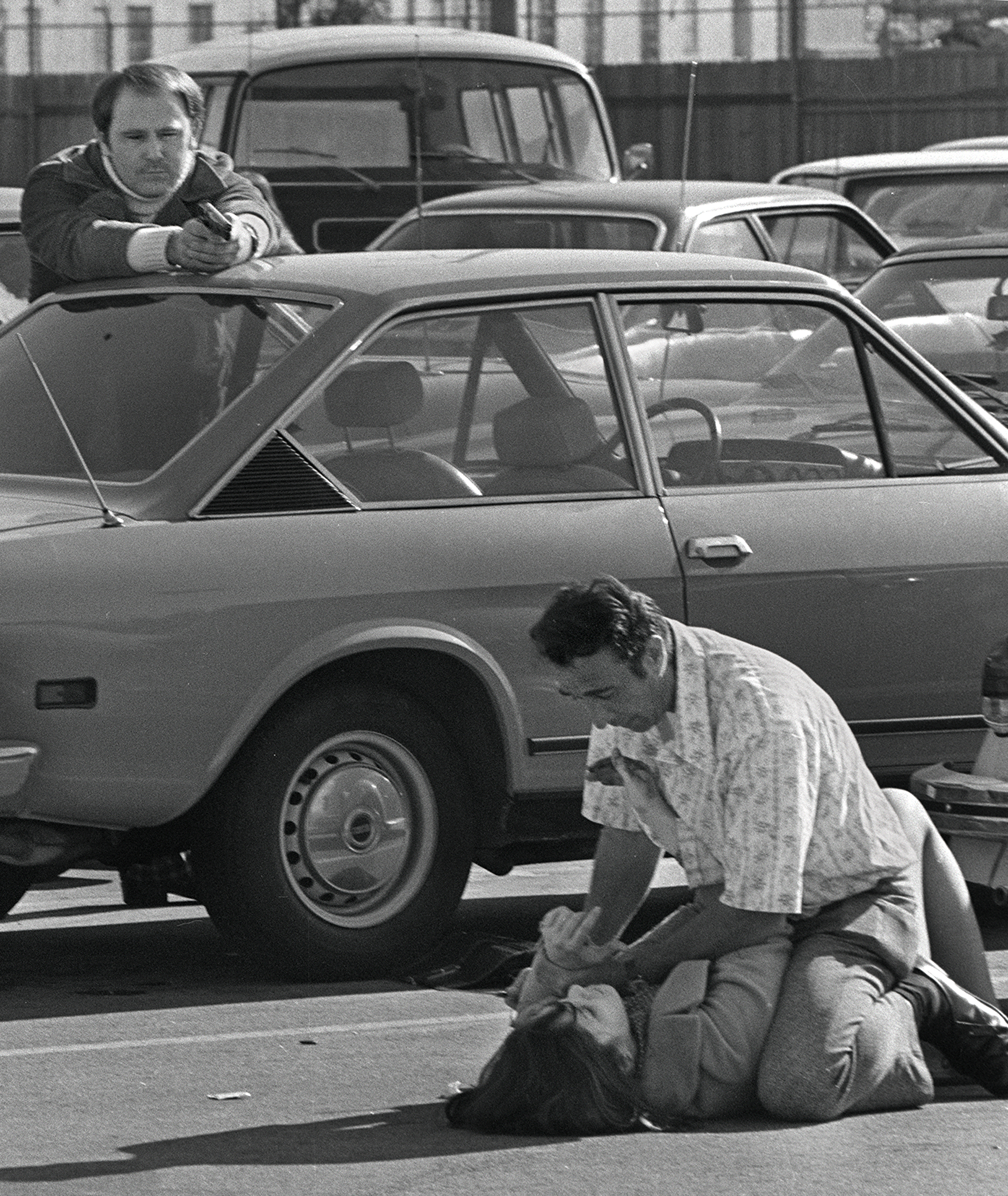
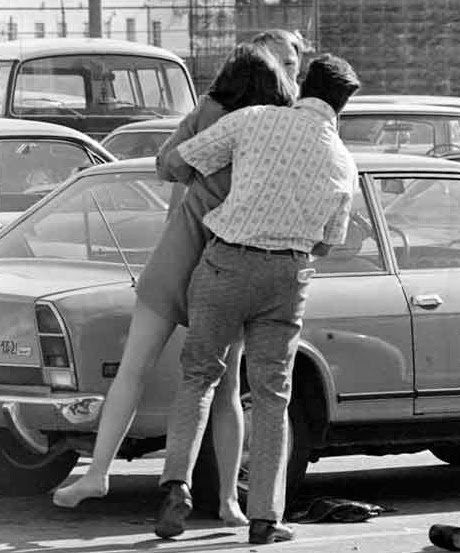
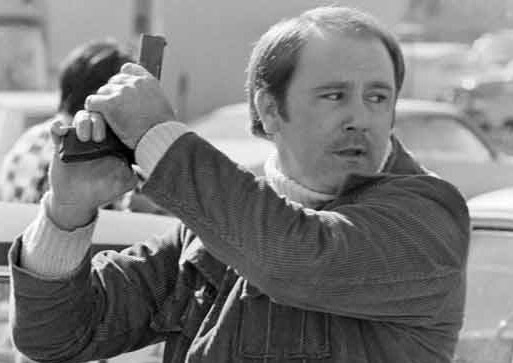
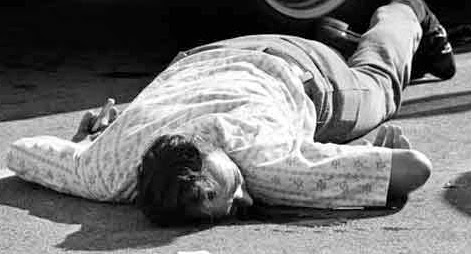
The prize-winning series of spot news photographs, Fatal Hollywood Drama

== Letters, Drama and Music Awards ==
- Fiction:
  - No award given.
- Drama:
  - No award given.
- History:
  - The Americans: The Democratic Experience by Daniel J. Boorstin (Random)
- Biography or Autobiography:
  - O'Neill, Son and Artist by Louis Sheaffer (Little)
- Poetry:
  - The Dolphin by Robert Lowell (Farrar)
- General Nonfiction:
  - The Denial of Death by Ernest Becker (Free Press/Macmillan)
- Music:
  - Notturno by Donald Martino (Ione Press)
    A chamber music piece commissioned by the Walter W. Naumburg Foundation and first performed May 15, 1973, at Alice Tully Hall, New York City, by Speculum Musicae.

== Special Citations and Awards ==
- Music:
  - Roger Sessions, a special citation to Roger Sessions for his life's work as a distinguished American composer.
