= The Providence Journal =

Newspaper published in Rhode Island, US

- The October 8, 2026, front page of The Providence Journal
- Type: Daily newspaper
- Format: Broadsheet
- Owner: USA Today Co.
- Founder: "Honest" John Miller
- Publisher: Peter Meyer
- Managing editor: Michael McDermott
- Founded: July 1, 1829; 197 years ago
- Headquarters: 75 Fountain Street; Providence, Rhode Island 02902
- City: Providence
- Country: United States
- Circulation: 27,820 Daily; 33,523 Sunday; (as of 2022)
- ISSN: 2574-3406
- OCLC number: 920412096
- Website: providencejournal.com

Logo of projo.com

The Providence Journal, colloquially known as the ProJo, is a daily newspaper serving the metropolitan area of Providence, and is the largest newspaper in Rhode Island, US. The newspaper was first published in 1829. The newspaper had won four Pulitzer Prizes as of 2026.

The Journal bills itself as "America's oldest daily newspaper in continuous publication", as the Hartford Courant, started in 1764, did not become a daily until 1837, and the New York Post, which began daily publication in 1801, suspended publication during strikes in 1958 and 1978.

== History ==
=== Early years ===
The beginnings of the Providence Journal Company were on January 3, 1820, when publisher "Honest" John Miller started the Manufacturers' & Farmers' Journal, Providence & Pawtucket Advertiser in Providence, published twice per week. The paper's office was in the old Coffee House, at the corner of Market Square and Canal street. The paper moved many times over the next few decades as it grew.

By 1829, demand for more timely news caused Miller to combine his existing publications into the Providence Daily Journal, published six days per week. The first edition of the Providence Daily Journal appeared July 1, 1829.

=== Knowles, Anthony & Danielson ===
During the years 1863 to 1884 the Journal was published by Knowles, Anthony & Danielson. These were Joseph Knowles, George W. Danielson and Henry B. Anthony. During this period the paper achieved considerable political influence, aligning itself with the Republican party and against Irish and Catholic immigrants. Anthony would become one of Rhode Island's most powerful politicians and go on to serve as Governor of Rhode Island and United States Senator.

During the Knowles, Anthony & Danielson years, the paper became known for its strong support of the Republican Party and gained the nickname "The Republican Bible". The Republican party ruled the state for much of the mid-1800s, and the Journal was their mouthpiece. During the Danielson/Anthony years, the paper was solidly allied with textile mill owners and big business, and frequently gave support to nativist anti-Irish Catholic sentiment.

In 1877, Danielson hired Charles Henry Dow, a young journalist with an interest in history. At the Journal, Dow developed a "news index" which summarized stories of historic interest. It is possible this was an early inspiration for Dow's later development of his "stock index" at The Wall Street Journal. While at the Journal Dow wrote a series on "The History of Steam Navigation between New York and Providence". Dow also traveled to Colorado to report on the Colorado Silver Boom and the Leadville miners' strike; these stories were published in May and June 1879. On the Colorado trip, Dow traveled with a team of Wall Street financiers and geologists, leading Dow to leave Providence for New York City in 1879 to advance his career as a reporter on mining stocks.

In 1863, Danielson launched an evening edition, called the Evening Bulletin. In 1885, a Sunday edition was added, making the publication schedule seven days per week. After Danielson's death, the paper became less partisan, and by 1888 declared its political independence.

Alfred M. Williams, editor from 1884 to 1891, broke from the Republican party and advocated for government reform, women's suffrage, and Indian rights. In contrast to Danielson and Anthony, Williams had a sympathetic appreciation for the Irish culture.

=== War years ===
Before American entry into World War I, Journal publisher and Australian immigrant John R. Rathom attempted to stir up public sentiment in favor of the war against the Central Powers. He frequently published exposés of German subversive activities in the United States, claiming that the Journal had intercepted secret German communications. By 1920, it was revealed that Rathom's information was supplied by British intelligence agents. Nonetheless, Rathom remained editor until his death in 1923.

William H. Garrison joined the staff in 1914, and became the publisher and vice president four years later, in 1918. He and his partners sold the paper to Senator Peter G. Gerry in 1923.

The Journal dropped "Daily" from its name and became The Providence Journal in 1920. In 1992, the Bulletin was discontinued, and its name was appended onto that of the morning paper: The Providence Journal-Bulletin.

Starting in 1925, the Journal became the first in the country to expand coverage statewide. It had news bureaus throughout Rhode Island and southeastern Massachusetts, a trend that had been inaugurated in 1925 by then-managing editor Sevellon Brown. Bureaus in Westerly, South Kingstown, Warwick, West Warwick, Greenville, Pawtucket, Woonsocket, Newport, Bristol/Warren in Rhode Island, and Attleboro and Fall River, in Massachusetts, were designed to make sure that reporters were only 20 minutes away from breaking news.

In 1937, the only competing Providence-based daily, the Star-Tribune, went bankrupt and was sold. The Providence Journal company bought it and kept it running for four months, then shut it down.

The paper also had a variety of regional editions, which it called "zones", that focused on city and town news. The system produced an intense focus on local news typically seen only in small-town newspapers. For example, everyone who died in the Journal's coverage area, rich or poor, received a free staff-written obituary.

=== Pulitzer Prizes ===
Chief editorial writer George W. Potter won the Journal's first Pulitzer Prize in 1945 for a series of essays, and the entire editorial staff won in 1953 for local deadline reporting. These were followed by Prizes in 1974 and 1994.

=== Uncovering Nixon tax scandal ===
During the 1970s, reporter Jack White, then manager of the Providence Journal-Bulletin bureau in Newport, Rhode Island, cultivated sources among Newport's elite. One source passed on to White evidence that President Richard Nixon had paid taxes amounting to $792.81 in 1970 and $878.03 in 1971, despite earning more than $400,000. White discovered that Nixon had illegally back-dated the donation of his papers to the National Archives, in order to avoid a new law which made such donations ineligible for tax deductions.

The night he was prepared to write the story, in September 1973, the union representing reporters at the newspaper voted to go on strike. White would later recall rolling the story out of his typewriter, folding it up and putting it in his wallet. He said he never thought about giving the story to management, even though he risked missing the story. Twelve days later, the strike ended, and the story ran on October 3, 1973.

At an Associated Press Managing Editors convention the following month, Journal reporter Joseph Ungaro asked Nixon about the story. Nixon replied with a quote that was to become associated with him for the rest of his life: "People have got to know whether or not their president is a crook. Well, I am not a crook." Shortly after this, the I.R.S. audited Nixon's tax returns. By December 1973, Nixon, under pressure, released five years of tax documents. This set a precedent for Presidents and presidential candidates to release tax returns, a custom that continued to 2016. White's story forced Nixon to pay hundreds of thousands of dollars in owed taxes. The story won White the 1974 Pulitzer Prize for National Reporting.

In 1988 the Committee for Skeptical Inquiry (CSICOP) presented reporter C. Eugene Emery Jr. with the Responsibility in Journalism Award for his researched claims of faith-healer Ralph A. DiOrio and wrote about the results in his journal.

=== 1990s ===
In the 1990s, rising production costs and declines in circulation prompted the Journal to consolidate both the bureaus and the editions. The editors tried to reinvigorate the coverage of city and town news in 1996, but competition from the Internet added fuel to the decline.

In 1997, the Livingston Award, sometimes called the "Pulitzer Prize for the Young", was awarded to Journal reporter C. J. Chivers for International Reporting for his series on the collapse of commercial fishing in the North Atlantic. Chivers, aged 32 when he won the award, left the Journal in 1999 to go to The New York Times.

=== Labor troubles ===
In 2001, reports in industry journals suggested that the Providence Journal was suffering from labor troubles, in which a "poisoned" workplace atmosphere led to a "talent hemorrhage." At least 35 news staffers left the paper between January 2000 and summer 2001, including 16 reporters, seven desk editors, two managerial staffers, and 10 administrative staff members. Publisher Howard Sutton denied there was a high turnover and called it normal attrition.

In 2001 the Providence Newspaper Guild filed 44 charges of alleged unfair labor practices with the National Labor Relations Board (NLRB) between December 1999 and June 2001. Judge William G. Kocol held a hearing on the complaints and found in the union's favor on 28 complaints in his ruling.

In June 2001, Livingston Award-winning former Journal reporter C.J. Chivers added to the allegations when he wrote an open letter to Belo chairman Robert Decherd, critical of Belo's management. In the letter he expressed concern that poor management was responsible for the departure of 57 employees. He accused management of "assuming a counterproductive attitude toward its staff," which included fights over expenses, and over-reliance on freelancers and interns. Executive Editor Alan Rosenberg retired in December 2020 after four decades, replaced by David Ng.

=== Financial problems and sale ===
In the face of declining revenue, the paper began charging for obituaries on January 4, 2005.

The paper's last Massachusetts edition was published on March 10, 2006. On October 10, 2008, the paper stopped publishing all of its zoned editions in Rhode Island and laid off 33 news staffers, including three managers. Even during the Great Depression, the Journal had not terminated news staff to cut costs.

The next few years included an extensive campaign to make the Internet version of the paper profitable. The Journal aggressively marketed its news on the web, pushing to get detailed stories onto its website, projo.com, before competing radio, television and other print outlets. But circulation continued to decline and online advertising failed to compensate.

In June 2011, the Journal laid off more than a dozen employees and eliminated its Promotion Department which had internally handled the newspaper's marketing and community affairs events for decades.

On October 18, 2011, with circulation down to about 94,000 on weekdays and 129,000 on Sundays (down from 164,000 and over 231,000 in 2005), the Journal renamed its website providencejournal.com, a move which meant that most of the previous Internet links to its content no longer worked. It also began implementing a system to require online readers to pay for content. Interactive images of its newspaper pages were initially available on personal computers and on the iPad for free. The paywall was put in place on February 28, 2012. The new website was part of a larger rebranding project by Nail Communications which also included a campaign entitled "We Work For The Truth". The rebranding failed to stem the circulation decline.

Throughout most of its history, the paper was privately owned. After the Journal became publicly traded and had acquired several television stations throughout the country (as well as cable television systems under the banner of Colony Communications; these systems were sold to Continental Cablevision in 1995), it was sold to the Dallas-based Belo Corp. in 1996. Belo also owned several television stations. The company later split into two entities and one, A. H. Belo, took control of the newspapers.

On December 4, 2013, A. H. Belo announced that it was seeking a buyer for the Journal, including its headquarters on 75 Fountain St. and its separate printing facility. The company said it wanted to focus on business interests in Dallas. Workers were not surprised because the announcement came after the company sold one of its other papers, the Riverside Press-Enterprise in California.

A. H. Belo announced on July 22, 2014, that it was selling the paper's assets to New Media Investment Group Inc., parent company of Fairport, N.Y.-based GateHouse Media, for $46 million. By then, the Journal's Monday through Friday circulation had dropped to 74,400, with an average of 99,100 on Sundays. Its website was getting 1.4 million unique users on an average month. The sale was completed on September 3, 2014, as several employees, including widely respected columnist Bob Kerr, were told they would not be transferred to the new company.

Bernie Szachara, senior vice president for publishing and group publisher at Local Media Group, a division of GateHouse Media, assumed the title of interim publisher, succeeding Howard G. Sutton. On February 27, 2015, Janet Hasson was named president and publisher of the Journal. The GateHouse Media news release announcing the appointment incorrectly reported that Hasson was the paper's first female publisher. That distinction belongs to Mary Caroline Knowles, who was publisher from 1874 until 1879.

In 2019, Journal parent company GateHouse Media purchased Gannett, the publisher of USA Today. This purchase established GateHouse as the largest newspaper company in the United States "by far", and also provided the Providence Journal with access to publish stories from the USA Today network of newspapers.

=== Falling circulation ===
In October 2015, average daily paid circulation was 89,452 on Sundays and 70,600 on weekdays. By June 2017, circulation was down to about 72,000 on Sundays and 56,000 on weekdays. In 2021 those figures dropped to 38,500 on Sundays and 29,957 weekdays; by contrast, both figures in 1990 were over 200,000. In December 2022, as part of a 6 percent targeted reduction in the Gannett news division, executive editor David Ng was laid-off. In March 2023, Gannet reported updated circulation numbers for The Providence Journal of 27,820 daily subscribers and 33,523 Sunday subscribers for 2022.

== Headquarters ==
The paper in its early days changed headquarters frequently as the paper grew.

The paper's original office was in the old Coffee House, at the corner of Market Square and Canal street. In 1823 it moved to the Union building, on the west side of the bridge, and in the following year to the Granite building, Market Square. In May 1833, the office moved again to the Whipple building on College Street. From 1844 to 1871, the paper was housed at the Washington buildings. In July 1871 the paper moved to the Barton block on Weybosset Street. In May 1889, the paper purchased the Fletcher building at the corner of Westminster, Eddy and Fulton Streets.

In 1905 the paper announced its move from Eddy Street to a brand new building next door at the corner of Eddy and Westminster St. The old building was demolished, and the new building extended over the site of the old. The ornate new building was designed in the Beaux-Arts style by Robert Swain Peabody of the noted Boston firm of Peabody & Stearns. It was completed in 1906. The Journal moved in 1934 to its present building on Fountain Street where the original Benny's store was located.

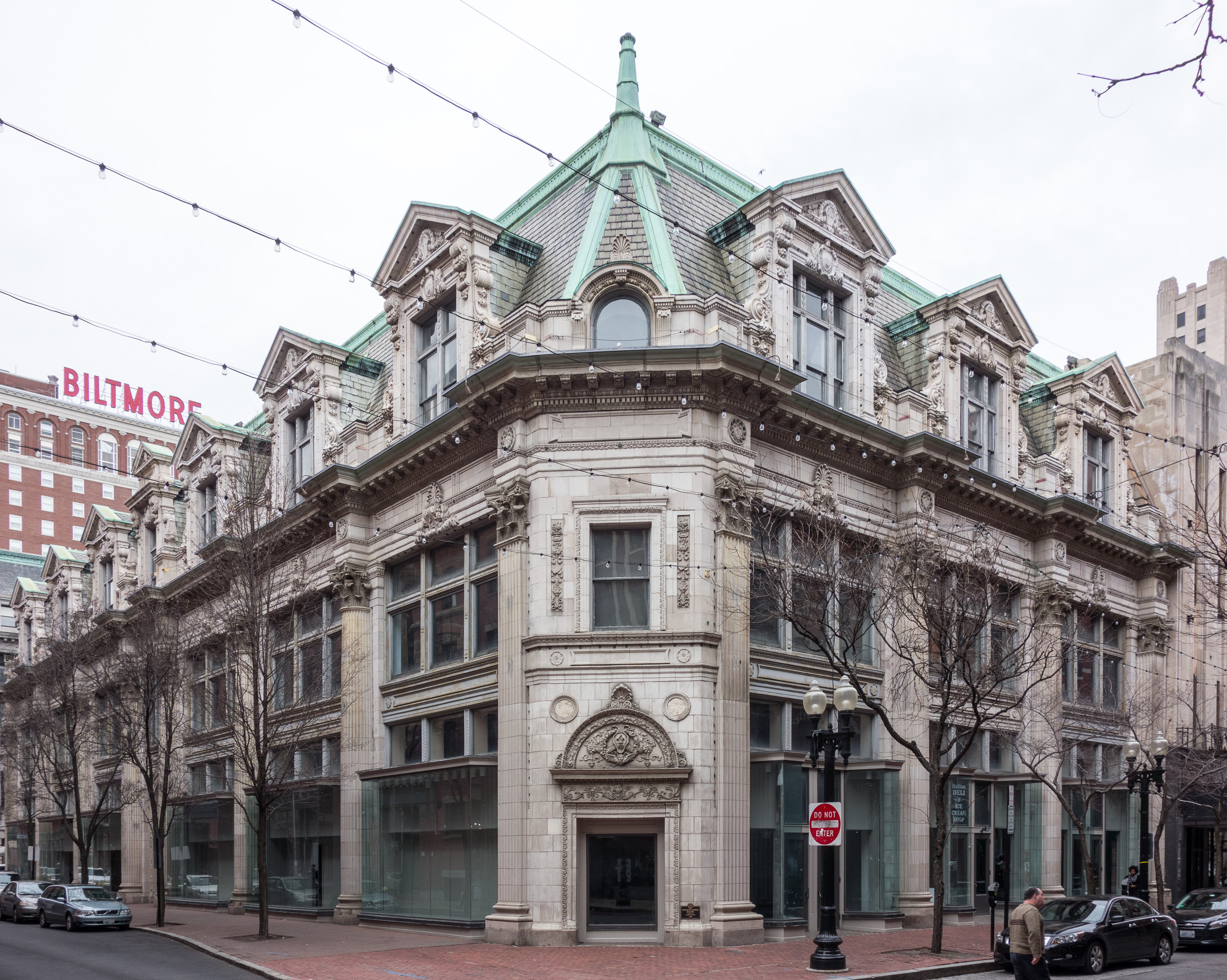
The Old Providence Journal Building at 203 Westminster St. seen from the corner of Westminster and Eddy Streets

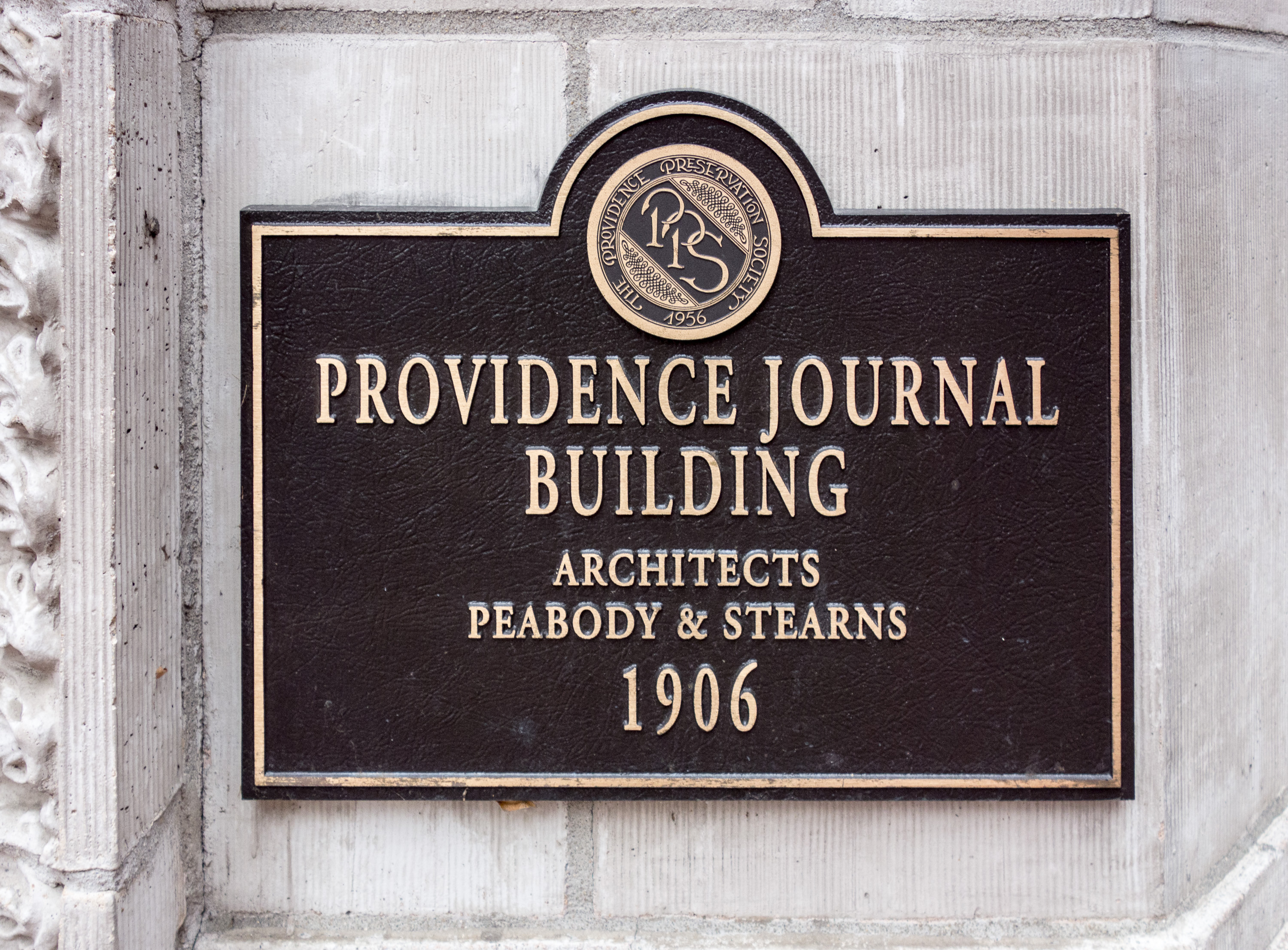
Plaque on the Old Providence Journal Building

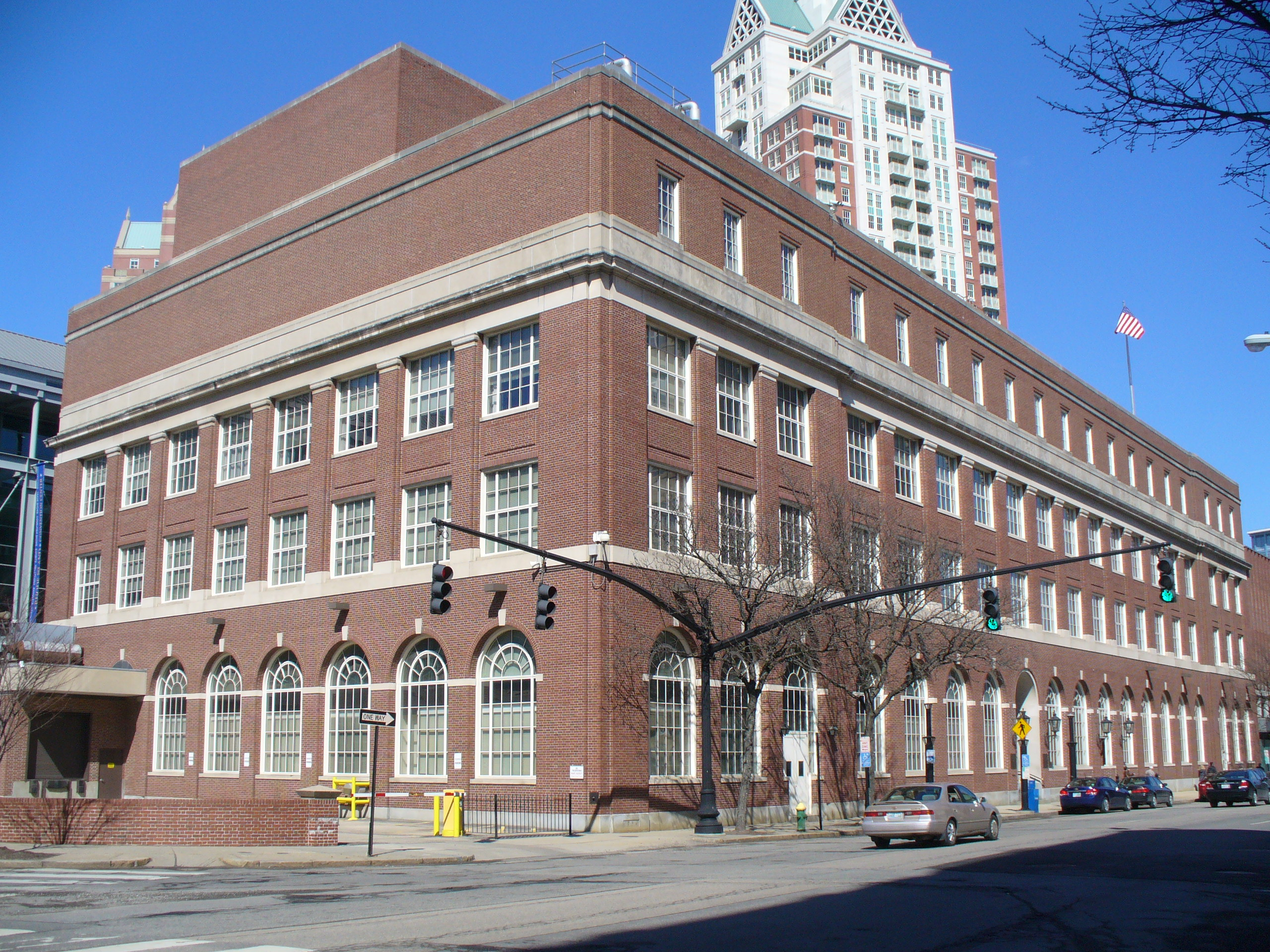
The current home of The Providence Journal on Fountain Street

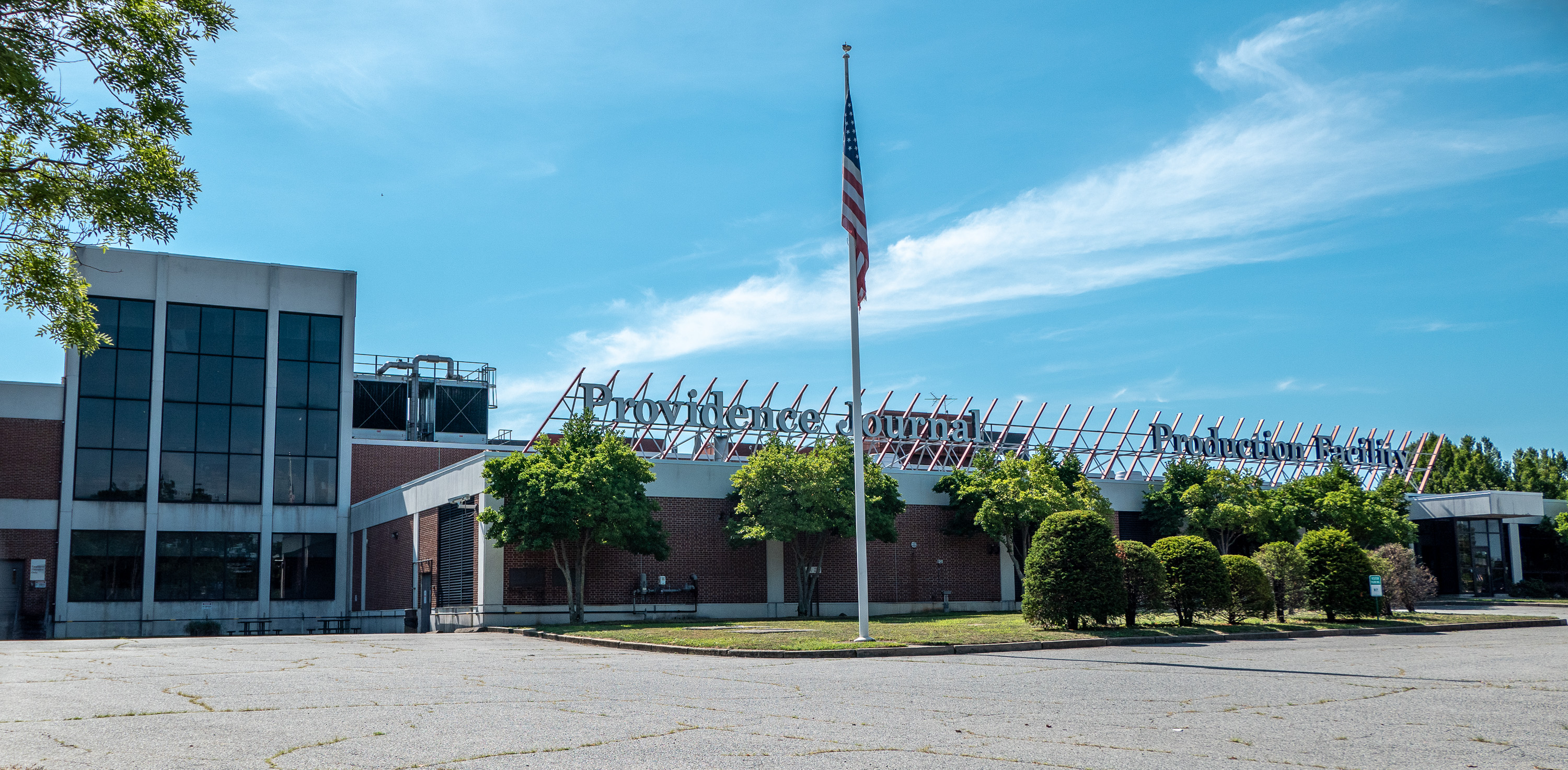
Production facility on Kinsey Avenue

== Journalism prizes and awards ==
- Chief editorial writer George W. Potter won the Journal's first Pulitzer in 1945 for a series of editorials on freedom of the press
- In 1950, editor Sevellon Brown and reporter Ben Bagdikian received Honorable Mention from the Peabody Awards for a series of commentaries and criticisms of broadcasts by Walter Winchell
- In 1953 the editorial staff won the Pulitzer for local reporting their spontaneous and cooperative coverage of a bank robbery and police chase leading to the capture of the bandit.
- In 1974, reporter Jack White won a Pulitzer Prize in National Reporting for investigating President Richard Nixon's Federal income tax payments in 1970 and 1971.
- In 1994, the Journal won a Pulitzer Prize in Investigative Reporting for exposing corruption in the Rhode Island court system
- In 1997, the Livingston Award, sometimes called the "Pulitzer Prize for the Young," was awarded to Journal reporter C. J. Chivers for International Reporting for his series on the collapse of commercial fishing in the North Atlantic.
- In 2016, the Journal was named New England Newspaper of the Year by the New England Newspaper and Press Association. The Journal also received the top editorial writing and public service awards.

== Notable contributors ==
- Henry B. Anthony
- Ben Bagdikian
- C. J. Chivers
- Charles Henry Dow
- Steven Krasner
- Philip Terzian
- Ruth Tripp
- Joseph Ungaro
- Robert Whitcomb
- Jack White

== Volume numbering ==
Through the paper's long history, there have been some inconsistencies in its volume numbering. In 1972, when the Saturday editions of the Journal and Bulletin were combined to create the Journal-Bulletin, the Saturday edition was reset to become Volume 1, Number 1. The daily edition of the paper followed suit in 1995 (becoming Volume XXIII) upon the termination of the Evening Bulletin. In July 2017, the Journal announced it was reverting to the original volume numbering. The Friday, July 21, 2017, edition of the newspaper was set to become Vol. CLXXXIX, No. 1, to mark the first paper of the 189th year.

== In popular culture ==
- In the television series Gilmore Girls, Rory Gilmore has a job interview at the newspaper.
- In the Farrelly brothers film Hall Pass, Owen Wilson's character Rick can be seen reading a copy of the newspaper in one scene.
