= Jack White (reporter) =

American journalist

Jack White (1942 – October 12, 2005) was an American journalist. He won the 1974 Pulitzer Prize in National Reporting for his coverage of President Richard Nixon's underpayment of income taxes. White's investigative article prompted Nixon to utter his famous line, "I am not a crook" to White's colleague Joseph Ungaro at a newspaper editors' conference in Florida. White also won Emmy Awards for his reporting on fugitive banker Joe Mollicone and Providence tax officials who violated the city's residency requirement. On his death, the Cape Cod Times called him "the dean of Rhode Island journalism."

== Newspaper career ==
White began his career at the Newport Daily News in 1969, and joined the Providence Journal-Evening Bulletin a year later. At the Journal, he was Newport Bureau chief and head of the newspaper's first permanent investigative team.

=== Nixon scandal ===
As manager of the Providence Journal-Bulletin's bureau in Newport, Rhode Island, in the early 1970s, White cultivated trusted sources among Newport's elite. One source passed on to White evidence that President Richard Nixon had paid taxes amounting to $792.81 in 1970 and $878.03 in 1971, despite earning more than $400,000. White revealed that Nixon had illegally back-dated the donation of his papers to the National Archives, in order to avoid a new law which made such donations ineligible for tax deductions.

White's Pulitzer-winning scoop almost didn't happen. The night he was prepared to write the story, in September 1973, the union representing reporters at the newspaper voted to go on strike. White would later recall rolling the story out of his typewriter, folding it up and putting it in his wallet. He said he never thought about giving the story to management, even though he risked missing the story. "I was dreading the information I had was going to get out there. Every day I was checking out-of-town newspapers," he later told The Providence Journal. Twelve days later, the strike ended, and the story ran on October 3, 1973.

At an Associated Press Managing Editors convention the following month, White's colleague Joseph Ungaro asked Nixon about the story. Nixon's answer became associated with the President for the rest of his life: "People have got to know whether or not their president is a crook. Well, I am not a crook." Nixon agreed to pay back taxes, which, with interest, amounted to $476,451. He ultimately only paid $465,000, the sum from the second IRS audit.

The story won White the 1974 Pulitzer Prize for National Reporting.

When White died in 2005, he still had not revealed his sources for the Nixon tax story. But the leak of Nixon's tax records were traced to a photocopy machine in the Internal Revenue Service's service center in Martinsburg, West Virginia. One unnamed agency employee quit to avoid being fired.

== Transition to television ==
White made the transition to television in 1979, when he joined the investigative team at WBZ-TV in Boston. He worked as a reporter and columnist for the Cape Cod Times from 1981 to 1984 before joining WPRI-TV in Rhode Island as chief investigative reporter in 1985.

RINPR called him "the dean of investigative reporters in Rhode Island", citing a 2001 example when former Providence mayor Buddy Cianci said he learned about his own indictment when Jack White reported on it.

== Personal life ==
White was married and had four children. He died in 2005 at Cape Cod Hospital in Barnstable, Massachusetts at the age of 63.

White's son, Tim White, succeeded him as the chief investigative reporter at WPRI-TV in 2006.
