= Burst of Joy =

Pulitzer Prize–winning photograph

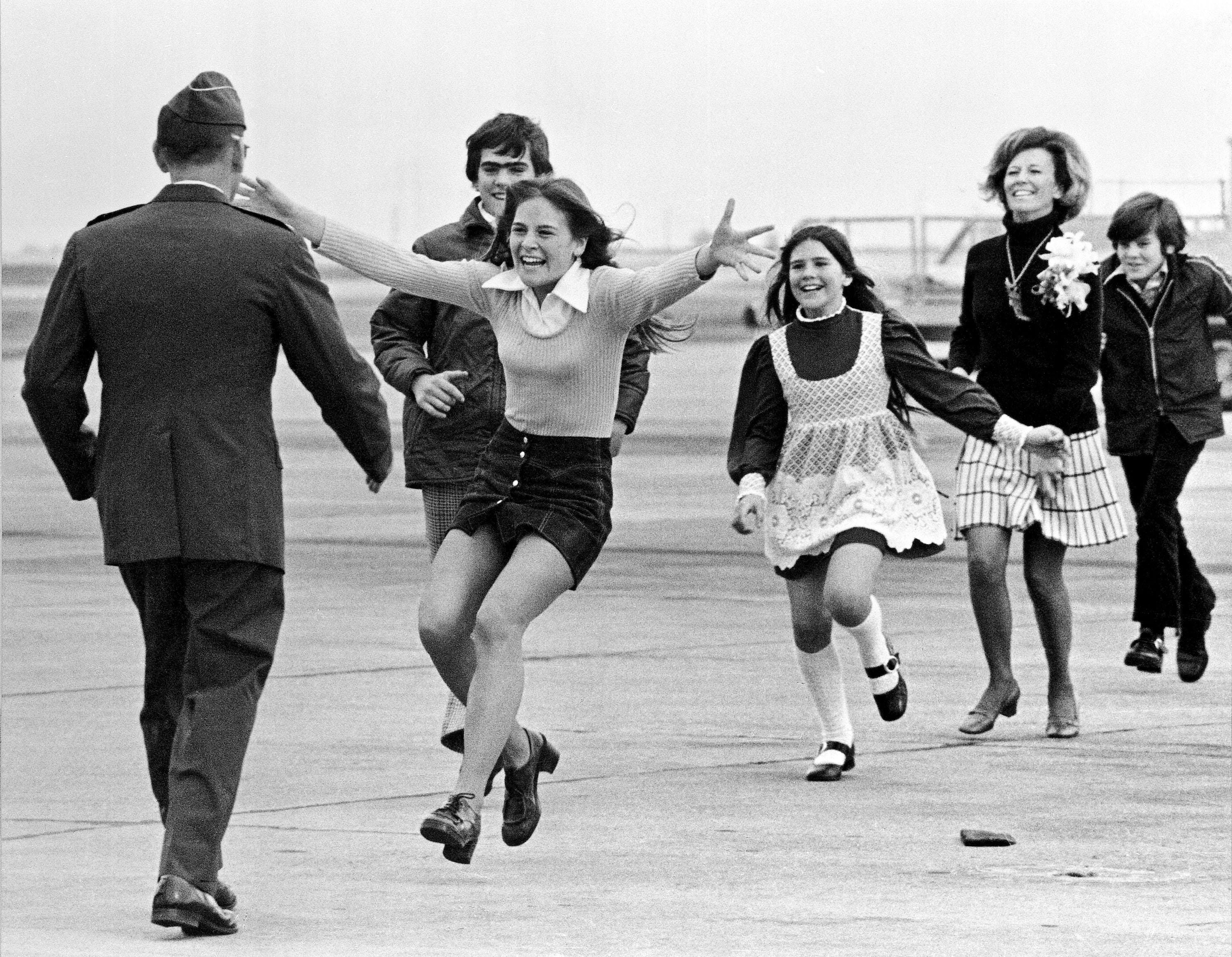
The photograph Burst of Joy. From left to right, Lt Col Robert L. Stirm, Lorrie Stirm, Bo Stirm (Robert L. Stirm Jr.), Cindy Stirm, Loretta Stirm, and Roger Stirm.

Burst of Joy is a Pulitzer Prize–winning photograph showing Robert L. Stirm (1933–2025), a lieutenant colonel in the United States Air Force, meeting his family after five years as a POW in North Vietnam due to the Vietnam War. The photograph was taken by Slava "Sal" Veder, an Associated Press photographer, on March 17, 1973, at Travis Air Force Base in Solano County, California. The image was widely published in newspapers and magazines and became one of the most recognizable photographs of the war's human aftermath.

== Background ==
After the Paris Peace Accords, the first group of American POWs leaving North Vietnamese prison camps left Hanoi on a United States Air Force (USAF) Lockheed C-141 Starlifter nicknamed the Hanoi Taxi, which flew them to Clark Air Base in the Philippines for medical examinations. On March 17, the plane landed at Travis Air Force Base in Solano County, California. Even though only twenty POWs of that first group were returned aboard the plane, almost 400 family members turned up for the homecoming. Stirm made a speech "on behalf of himself and other POWs who had arrived from Vietnam as part of Operation Homecoming."

Smithsonian Magazine says that "Veder, who'd been standing in a crowded bullpen with dozens of other journalists, noticed the sprinting family and started taking pictures. 'You could feel the energy and the raw emotion in the air'."

Veder then rushed to the makeshift photo developing station (for 35 mm film) in the ladies' room of the air base's flightline washrooms, while the photographers from United Press International were in the men's. Smithsonian magazine said that "In less than half an hour, Veder and his AP colleague Walt Zeboski had developed six remarkable images of that singular moment. Veder's pick, which he instantly titled Burst of Joy, was sent out over the news-service wires". The New York Times reported that Veder had told The Guardian "he was not aware The A.P. had submitted "Burst of Joy" for Pulitzer consideration, saying he credited the prize to 'pure fortune' of time and place."

== Subjects ==
The photograph depicts Stirm being reunited with his family after spending more than five years in captivity as a prisoner of war in North Vietnam. On October 27, 1967, Stirm was shot down over Hanoi while leading a flight of F-105s on a bombing mission, and was not released until March 14, 1973. The centerpiece of the photograph is Stirm's 15-year-old daughter Lorrie, who is excitedly greeting her father with arms stretched, as the rest of the family approaches directly behind her. Lorrie later recounted in 2003: "We were in a car behind the aircraft on the tarmac, and then they said, 'You can get out now.' So we just burst out of the car and started running to my dad. . . We were very excited." Lorrie's exuberant reaction earned her moniker "The Jumper" or "The Leaper".

Despite outward appearances, the reunion was an unhappy one for Stirm. Three days before he arrived in the United States, the same day he was released from captivity, Robert Stirm received a Dear John letter from his wife Loretta informing him that their marriage was over. Robert later learned that Loretta had been seeing other men throughout his captivity and had received marriage proposals from three of them. In 1974, the Stirms divorced and Robert was ordered to provide Loretta with their $24,000 home (equivalent to $156,680 in 2025) and their car, as well as $300-a-month child support and 42.9% of his military pension once he retired from the Air Force, although the divorce judge stated that much evidence was presented to the court of Loretta's infidelity while Stirm was a prisoner. That same year, both Loretta and Robert Stirm remarried. Robert Stirm was later promoted to colonel, retired from the Air Force in 1977, and died on Veterans Day, 2025. Loretta Stirm died on August 13, 2010, from cancer.

After Burst of Joy was announced as the winner of the Pulitzer Prize, all of the family members depicted in the picture received copies. The depicted children displayed it prominently in their homes, but not Robert Stirm, who in 2005 said he could not bring himself to display the picture.

Lorrie Stirm appeared on Antiques Roadshow on January 2, 2023, seeking an appraisal for an archive of items relating to the event: Lorrie's personal print of the famous photograph (signed by the photographer in 1990), her father's prison uniform, Red Cross luggage with a North Vietnamese tag, a spoon engraved with "Lt. Col. Stirm" and a thunderbolt that was made during his imprisonment, and a pair of sandals that the North Vietnamese claimed were made from the wheels of Stirm's crashed plane. Auctioneer Joel Bohy valued the items as worth $2500–$3000 at auction, but said the "historical value on this is absolutely priceless".

== Reactions ==
About the picture and its legacy, Lorrie Stirm Kitching once noted, "We have this very nice picture of a very happy moment, but every time I look at it, I remember the families that weren't reunited, and the ones that aren't being reunited today—many, many families—and I think, I'm one of the lucky ones."

Donald Goldstein, a retired Air Force colonel and a co-author of a prominent Vietnam War photojournalism book, The Vietnam War: The Stories and The Photographs, says of Burst of Joy, "After years of fighting a war we couldn't win, a war that tore us apart, it was finally over, and the country could start healing."

== See also ==
- 1974 Pulitzer Prize
- United States prisoners of war during the Vietnam War

== Bibliography ==
=== References ===
- Boyle, John, director. "Filoli, Hour 1". Performance by Coral Peña, PBS: Antiques Roadshow, Public Broadcasting Service, 2 Jan. 2023. Accessed 18 Jan. 2023.
- Butler, Carolyn Kleiner (2005). "Coming Home: To a War-Weary Nation, a U.S. POW's Return from Captivity in Vietnam in 1973 Looked Like the Happiest of Reunions". Smithsonian magazine.
- Fischer, Heinz Dietrich; Fischer, Erika J. (2000). Press Photography Awards, 1942–1998: From Joe Rosenthal and Horst Faas to Moneta Sleet and Stan Grossfeld (2000 ed.). Walter de Gruyter. ISBN 9783598301704. - Total pages: 289
- Longman, Jeré (November 19, 2025). "Robert L. Stirm, Returning P.O.W. in Pulitzer-Winning Photo, Dies at 92". The New York Times.
- Lucas, Dean (July 26, 2010). "Burst of Joy". Famous Pictures.
- "1974 Winners". The Pulitzer Prizes. 2012.
