= Market House (Providence, Rhode Island) =

- U.S. National Register of Historic Places
- U.S. National Historic Landmark District – Contributing property
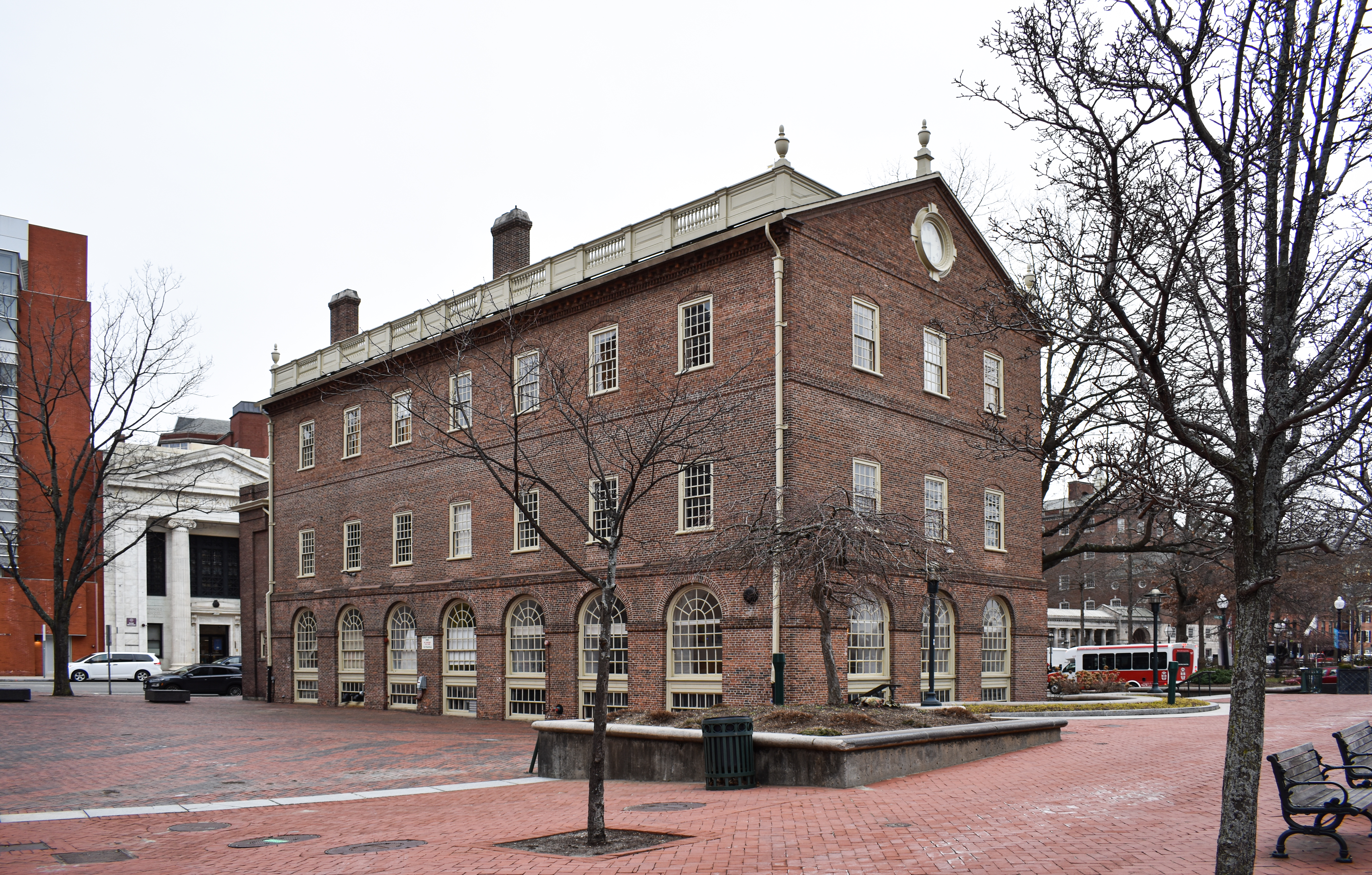
- Market House in 2021

- Location within Rhode Island Location within the United States
- Location: Providence, RI
- Coordinates: 41.82581°N 71.40833°W
- Built: 1773-1775
- Architect: Joseph Brown; Stephen Hopkins
- Architectural style: Georgian
- Part of: College Hill Historic District (ID70000019)
- NRHP reference No.: 72000001

Significant dates
- Added to NRHP: April 13, 1972
- Designated NHLDCP: November 10, 1970

The Market House is a historic three-story brick market house in Market Square, in the College Hill neighborhood of Providence, Rhode Island, US. The building was constructed between 1773 and 1775 and designed by prominent local architects, Joseph Brown and Declaration of Independence signer Stephen Hopkins. The bottom floor of the house was used as a market, and the upper level was used for holding meetings. Similar buildings existed in other American cities, such as Faneuil Hall in Boston and the Old Brick Market in Newport. The building housed the Providence City Council in the decades before the completion of City Hall.

== Architecture ==
The primary architect for the Market House was Joseph Brown, then the foremost architect of the city. Brown's previous commissioned work included University Hall at Brown University and the First Baptist Meeting House. Brown was assisted in the design process by Stephen Hopkins.

The building was originally two stories in height, topped by a low gable roof. In 1797, a third floor was added to the house, which housed the first Masonic Lodge in Rhode Island. At this time, a wooden balustrade was added to the roof of the building. The east gable features a large bull's-eye window, while the west gable features a clock, installed in the 20th century.

With the exception of the building's eastern end, the first floor of is surrounded on all sides by a series of large round arches that originally formed an arcade. In the 19th century, the arcade was closed off with the installation of windows.

In 1833, architect James C. Bucklin designed a two-story addition on the east end of the building. This addition provided an entrance to the third story Masonic hall.

== History ==
In August 1771, a petition signed by a number of townspeople was presented to the General Assembly, asking for a market house. The General Assembly raised funds through a lottery to erect a building in a location proposed by David Bucklin. Excavations on Market House began on May 25, 1773 and were completed in 1775.

Almost immediately, Market House became the center of civic life in Providence, Rhode Island, due to its central location at the east end of the Weybosset Bridge. On March 2, 1775, residents gathered there to show their resistance to British taxation by burning British tea.

During the American Revolution, the buildings were used as barracks for French soldiers encamped in Providence.

The building's third floor housed the first Masonic Lodge in Rhode Island. Thomas Smith Webb was a member of the lodge, and in 1802 Webb organized St. John's Encampment Number One, which was the first Knights Templar organization in America.

In 1832, Providence Mayor Samuel W. Bridgham moved Providence City Council to meet in Market House. At first, the City Council, Mayor's Office, and Board of Aldermen were located on the second floor. As the city grew, the city government purchased the third floor from the Masons, and eventually occupied the entire building, which was then renamed the "City Building." By 1845 the city government outgrew the building and drew up plans to build a new City Hall. By 1878 the new City Hall was completed and the city vacated Market House.

In the years after the city left the building, tenants included the Providence Board of Trade (later known as the Chamber of Commerce), the Henry Lippitt Company, several manufacturing companies, a barber, the Rhode Island Poultry Association, and the Rhode Island Electric Light Company. Market Square and Westminster Street were the first parts of Providence to receive electric street lights.

The building underwent some restoration work in the 1930s, and by 1940 the building was restored to its 1833 appearance. In 1948, Mayor Dennis J. Roberts signed a deed to give the building to the Rhode Island School of Design, with the provision that the exterior of the building be maintained. Architect John Hutchins Cady was hired to remodel the interior with classrooms and studios.

A pair of plaques on the exterior wall marks the highest water levels reached during the Great Storm of 1815 and the Hurricane of 1938.

The building was added to the National Register of Historic Places in 1972.

== Gallery ==
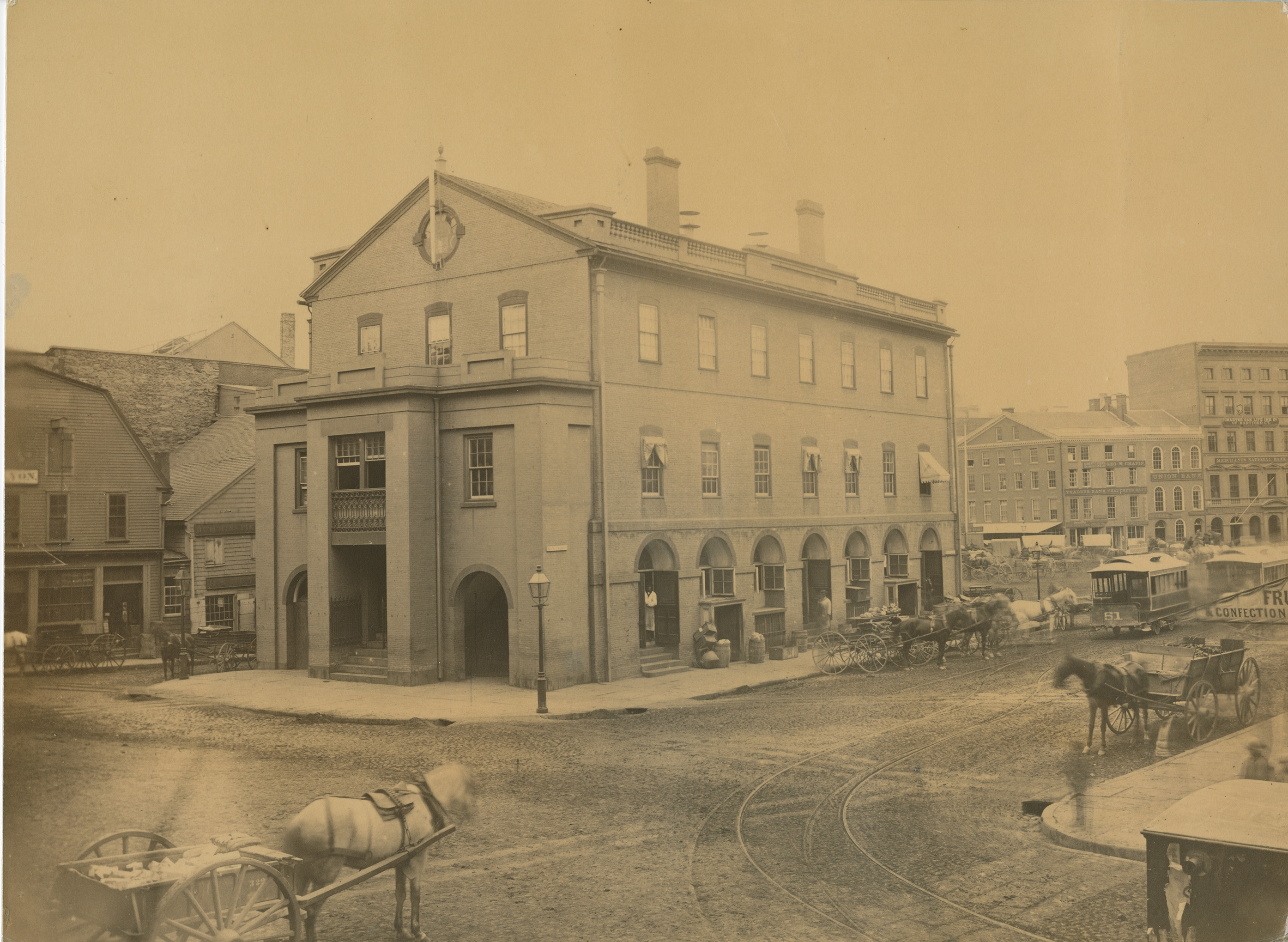
Market House, c. 1860

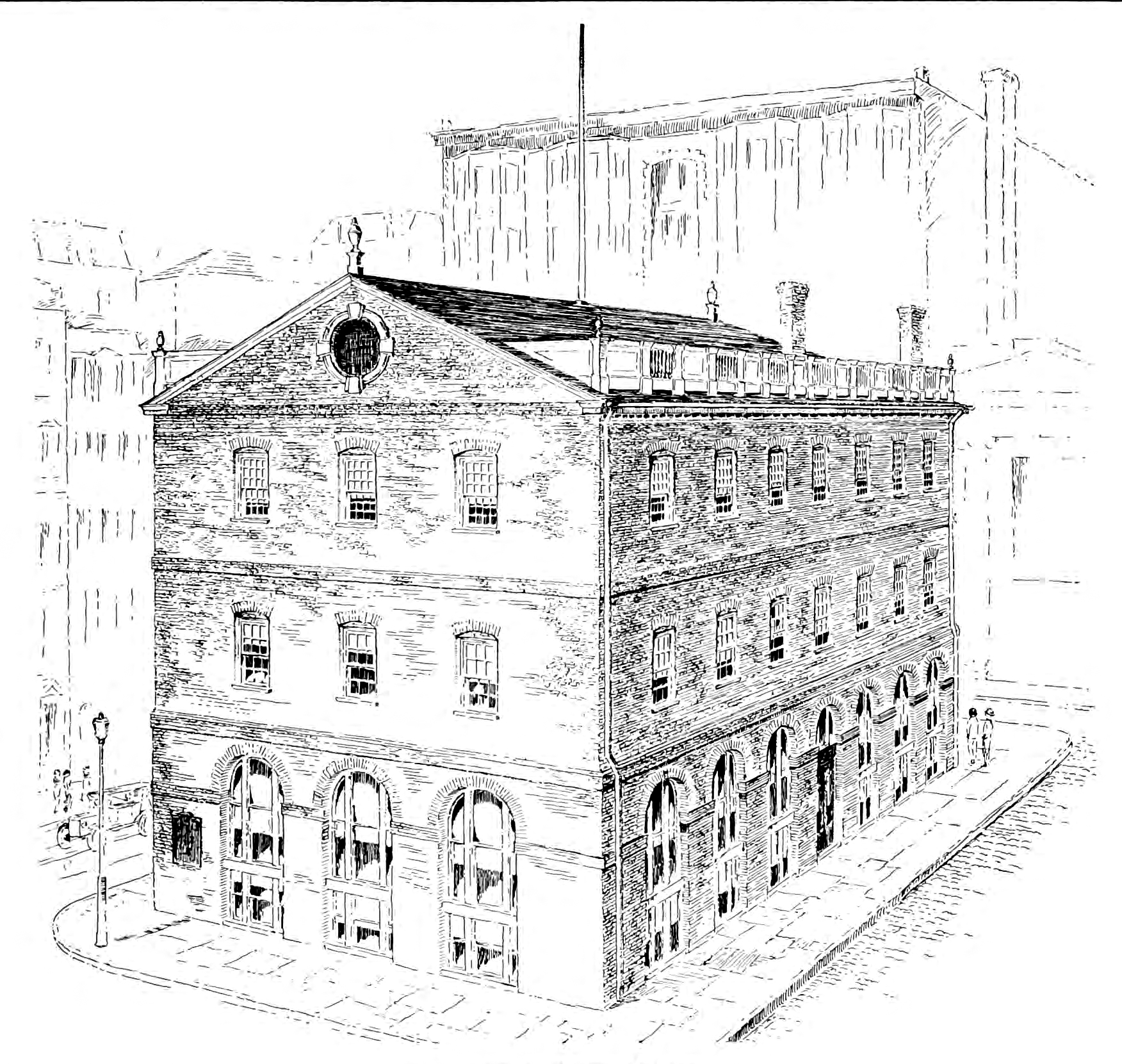
A drawing of the building published in 1915

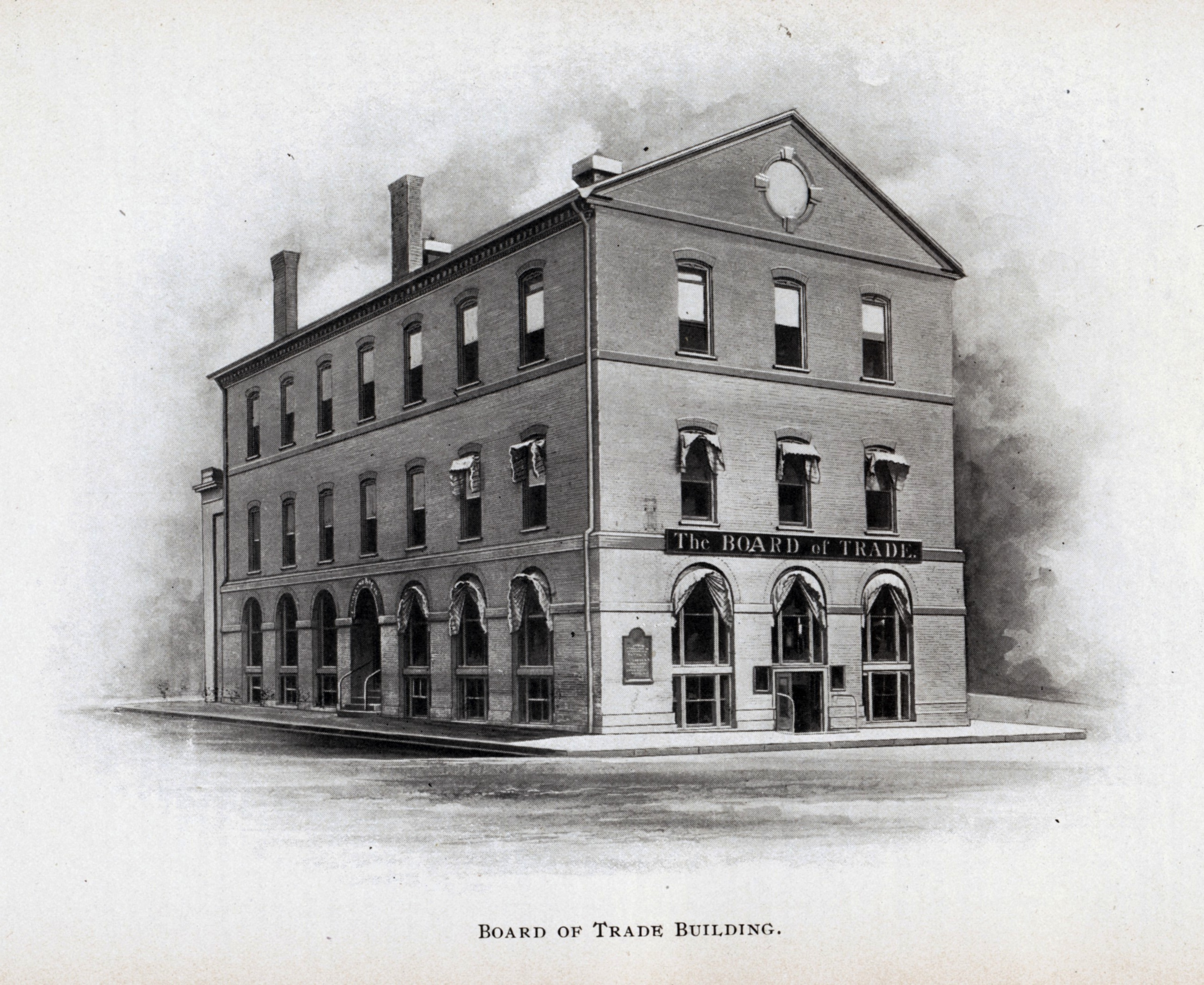
The structure in 1898, when it served as the Board of Trade Building

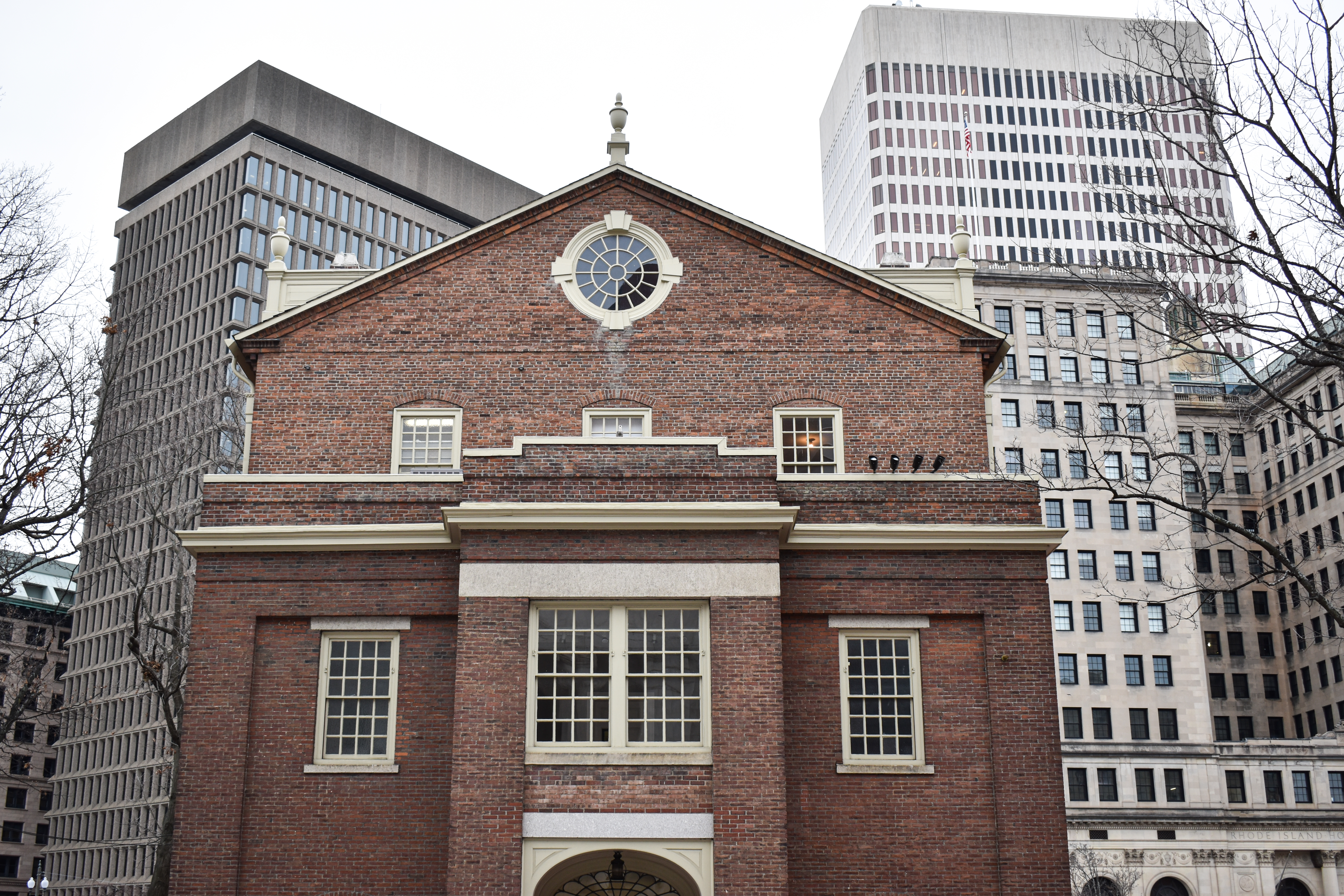
View of the building's eastern facade, Downtown Providence is visible in the background

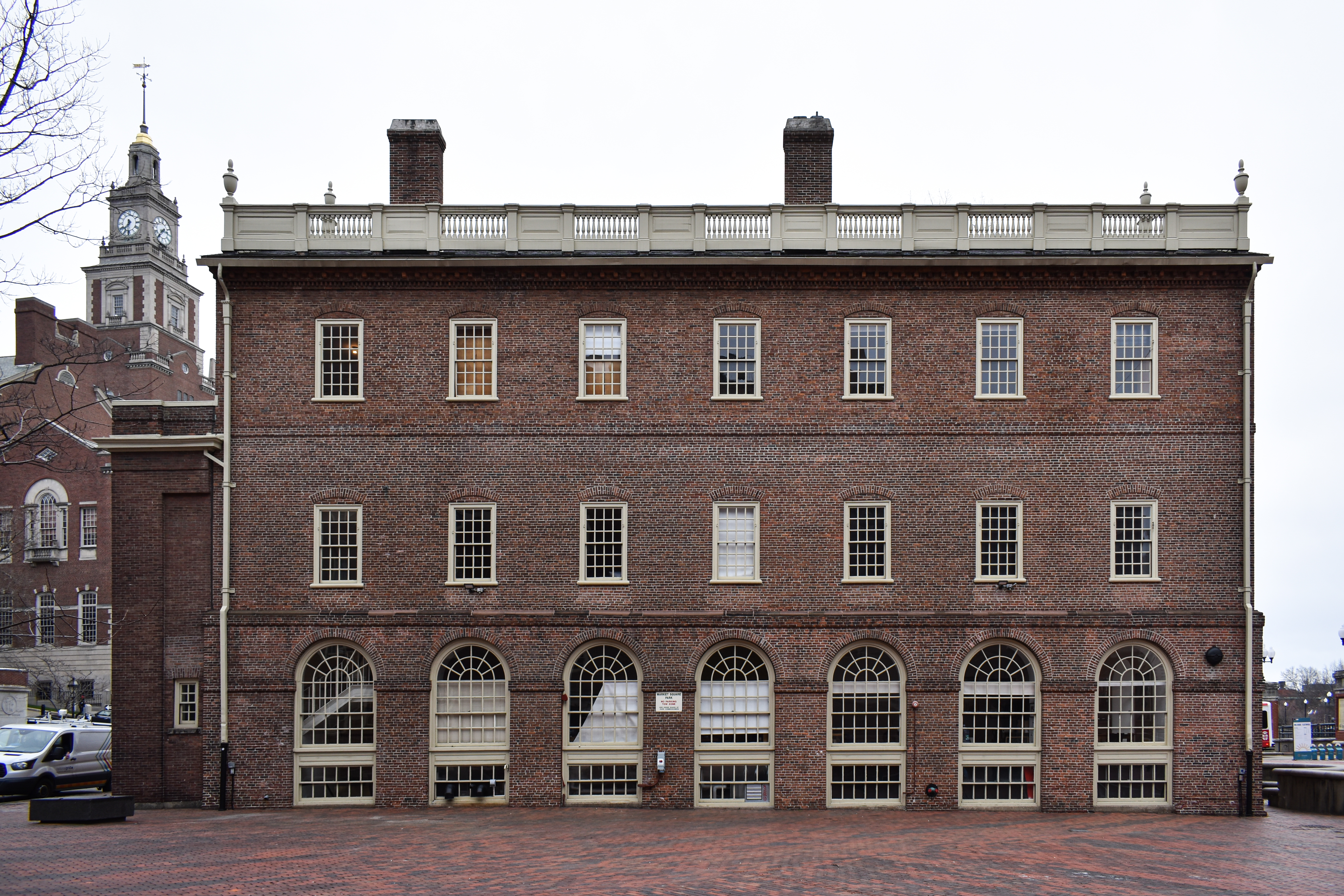
The building's northern facade

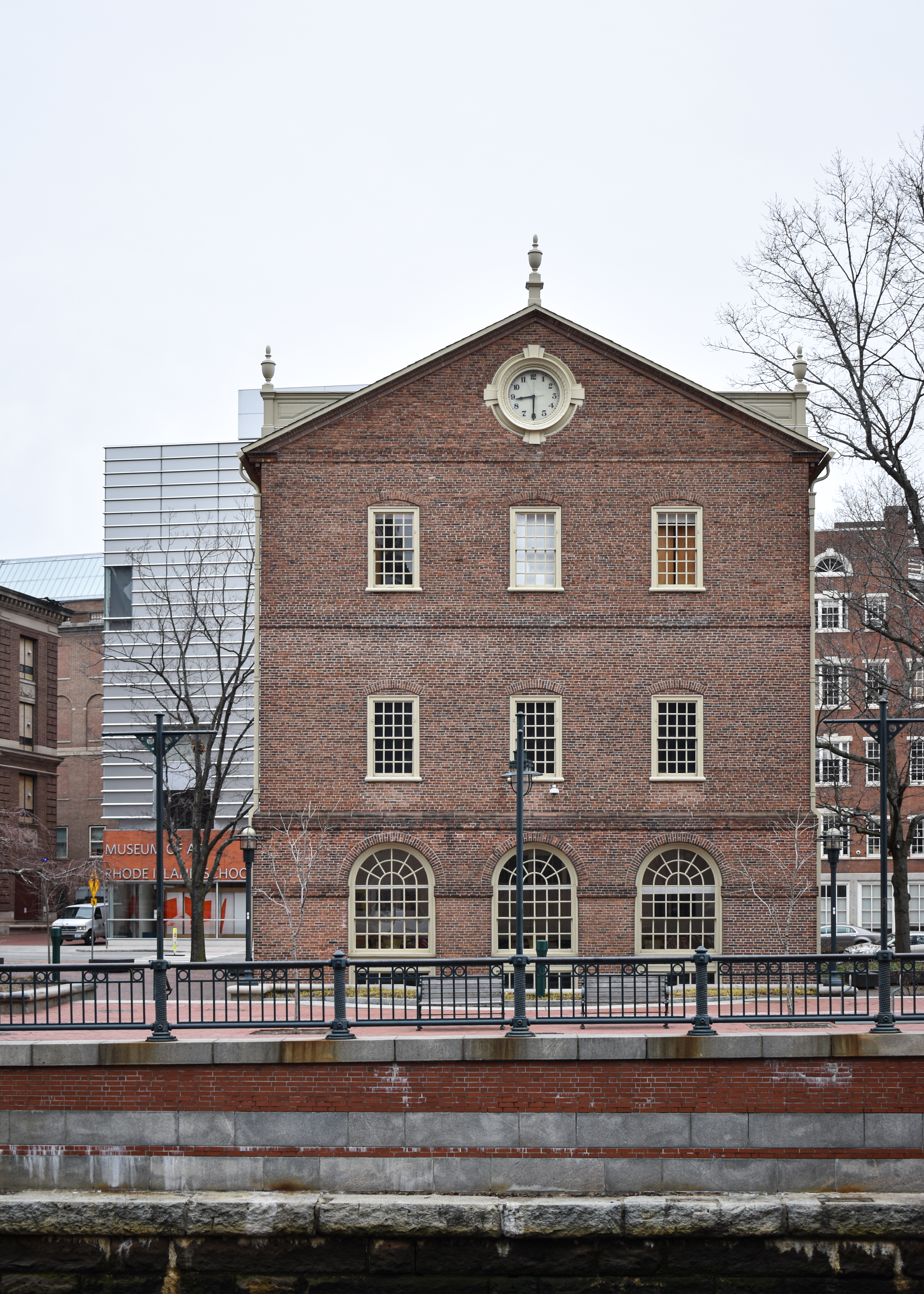
The building's western facade from across the Providence River

== See also ==
- National Register of Historic Places listings in Providence, Rhode Island
