= 1815 New England hurricane =

Category 4 Atlantic hurricane in 1815

Great September Gale
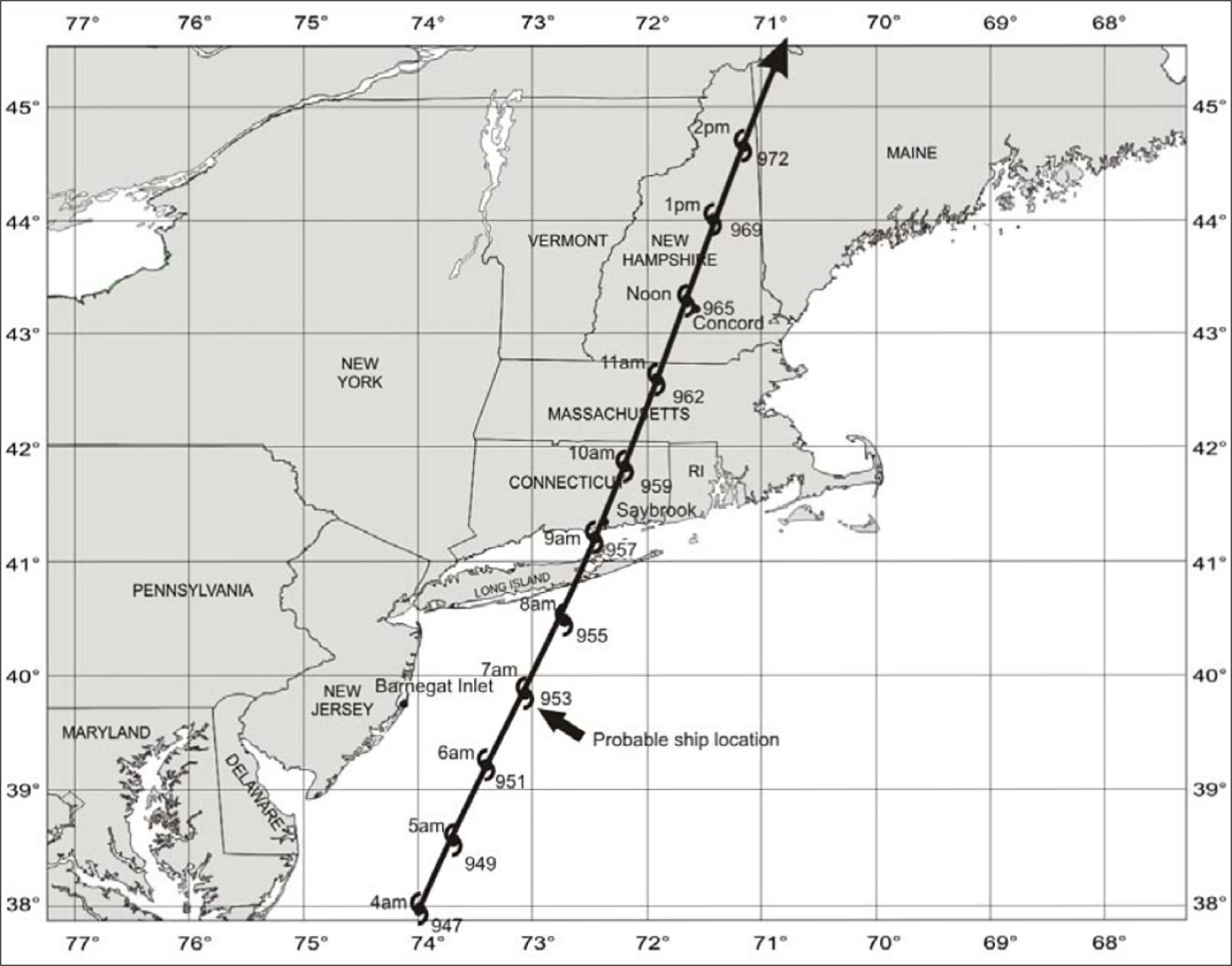
- Map of the Great Colonial Hurricane's path (reconstructed by the AOML)

Meteorological history
- Formed: Unknown
- Dissipated: September 24, 1815

Category 4 major hurricane
- 1-minute sustained (SSHWS/NWS)
- Highest winds: ≥130 mph (≥215 km/h)
- Lowest pressure: ≤947 mbar (hPa); ≤27.96 inHg (estimated)

Overall effects
- Fatalities: 38+ direct
- Injuries: Unknown
- Damage: $12.5 million (1815 USD)
- Areas affected: Long Island, New England, other areas?
- Part of the 1815 Atlantic hurricane season

The Great September Gale of 1815 was a deadly and fast-moving Category 4 Atlantic hurricane in 1815 that became the second of five known major hurricanes to strike New England. At the time, it was the first hurricane to strike the greater area in 180 years.

After striking on Long Island, the hurricane caused major damage in Connecticut, Massachusetts, New Hampshire and Rhode Island. Rhode Island suffered the worst damage, as the storm surge flooded towns along Narragansett Bay up to and including Providence.

== Origin ==
The summer of 1815 was reported to have been unusually stormy, possibly because of transient climate changes induced by ash clouds from the eruption of Mount Tambora in April. The hurricane first struck the Turks Islands near the Bahamas on September 20, with a strength estimated to have been equivalent to a Category 4 hurricane.

== Impact ==
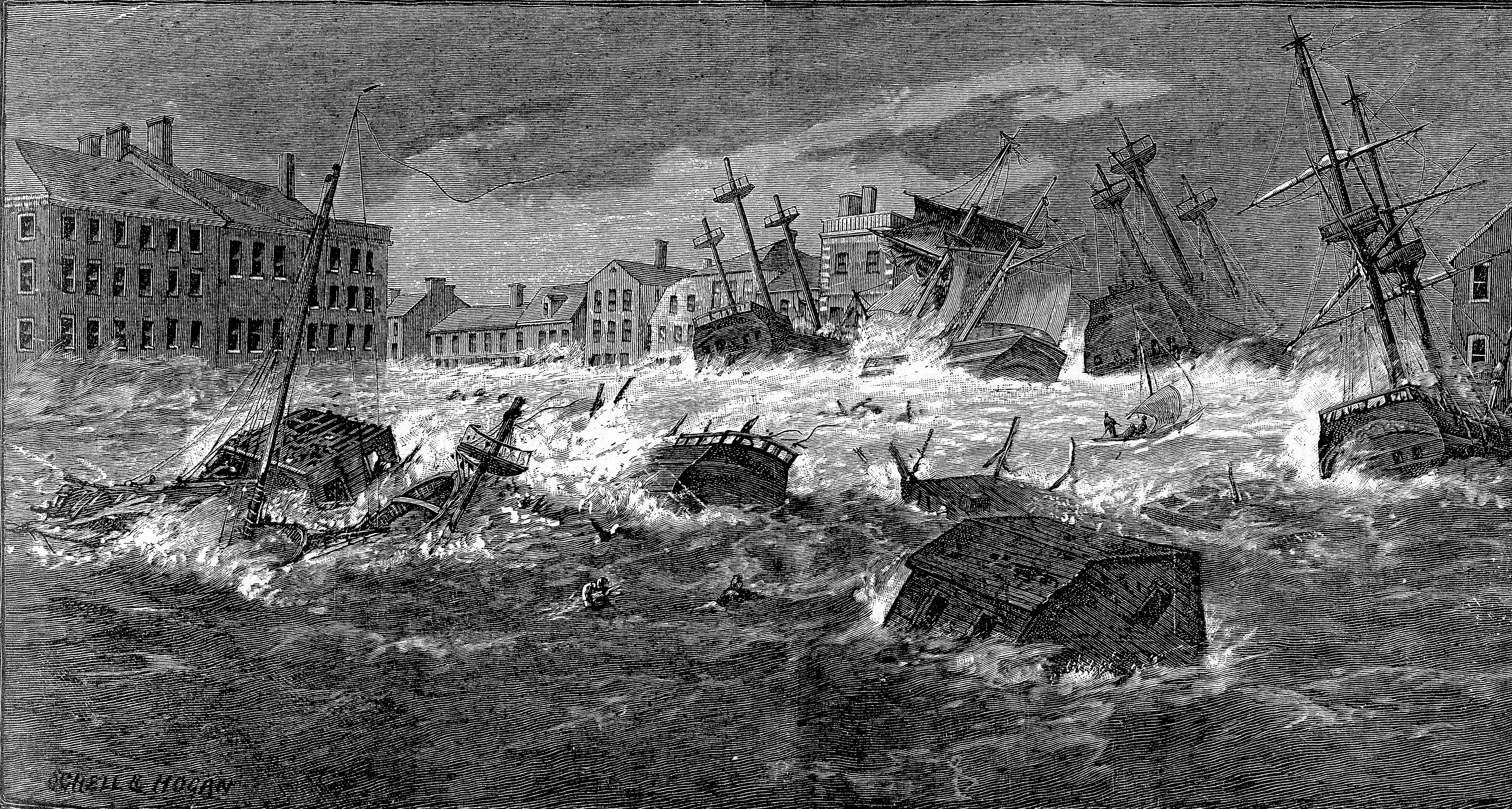
The Great Storm of 1815 sends ships and water into downtown Providence, Rhode Island

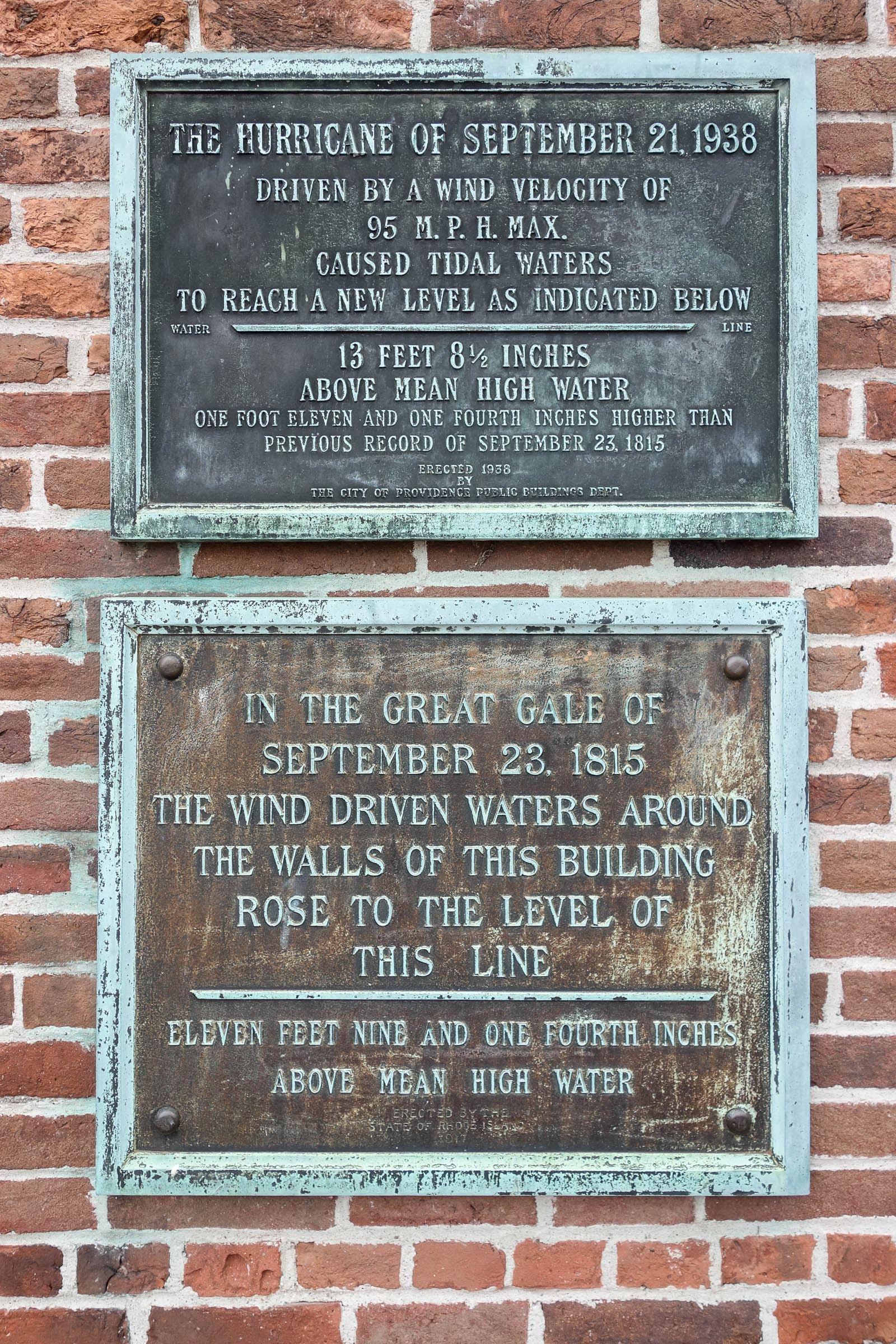
Water levels of the 1815 and 1938 storms are marked at Old Market House, Providence

=== New York ===
The storm struck Long Island on September 23, 1815, probably coming ashore near Center Moriches around 7:00 A.M. On the south shore of Long Island it broke through the barrier beach and created the inlet that still isolates Long Beach, which had previously been an eastward extension of The Rockaways.

=== Connecticut ===
Around 9:00 A.M. the storm came ashore at Saybrook, Connecticut with the force of what would now be considered a Category 3 hurricane. Waves of up to six feet were reported in New London.

=== Rhode Island ===
The "Great Storm" (or "Great Gale"), as it was known there, hit Providence, Rhode Island on the morning of September 23. From about 10:00 A.M. to noon, the storm delivered a storm surge that funneled up Narragansett Bay where it destroyed some 500 houses and 35 ships. Dozens of ships were deposited on the streets of Providence. The bowsprit of the ship "Ganges" was smashed into the third story of the Washington Insurance Company building. The Second Baptist Meeting House was destroyed. Most of the buildings on the east side from south of the Market House to India Point were destroyed. At India Point, houses and wharves were destroyed. Both the Washington Bridge and the Central (Red) Bridge were uprooted from their piers and destroyed.

The rain appears to have been saturated with salt. The leaves on trees which were not blown away were covered with a white salt coating that resembled a light frost. Even houses turned white.

A line on the Old Market Building marks the 11-foot (3.4 m) storm surge that was unsurpassed in the city until the 1938 New England hurricane, which brought a 17.6-foot (5.4 m) storm surge. There is still a worn plaque on the Rhode Island Hospital Trust building (built in 1917), along with a newer plaque showing the higher 1938 hurricane water level. At Matunuck, Rhode Island, sediment studies have identified the overwash fan of sediments in Succotash Marsh, where the 1815 hurricane storm surge overtopped the barrier beach.

The financial loss was estimated at one and a half million dollars, one-quarter the total valuation of the city. Fortunately, only two people died, both in India Point.

After the storm, much of the Narragansett Bay area was rebuilt with higher riverbanks, raised wharves, and more durable building practices, to help protect against future storms.

=== Massachusetts ===
In Dorchester, Massachusetts, just south of Boston, local historian William Dana Orcutt wrote in the late 19th century of the hurricane's impact: "In 1815 there was a great gale which destroyed the arch of the bridge over the Neponset River. This arch was erected over the bridge at the dividing line of the towns [Dorchester and Milton] in 1798." Dorchester's First Parish Meeting House was too badly damaged to repair.

=== New Hampshire ===
The eye passed into New Hampshire near Jaffrey and Hillsborough.

== Meteorology ==
In the aftermath of the Great Gale, the concept of a hurricane as a "moving vortex" was presented by John Farrar, Hollis Professor of Mathematics and Natural Philosophy at Harvard University. In an 1819 paper he concluded that the storm "appears to have been a moving vortex and not the rushing forward of a great body of the atmosphere".

== See also ==
- List of New England hurricanes
- List of New Jersey hurricanes
