= Louis Sheaffer =

American journalist (1912 – 1993)

Louis Sheaffer (né Slung October 18, 1912 – August 7, 1993) was an American journalist for the Brooklyn Eagle between 1934 and 1955. After the newspaper's closure in 1955, Sheaffer wrote a two part biography on Eugene O'Neill and released the first volume O'Neill: Son and Playwright in 1968. The final part of Sheaffer's biography on O'Neill, titled O'Neill: Son and Artist, was awarded the 1974 Pulitzer Prize for Biography or Autobiography and nominated for the 1974 National Book Award for Biography. Apart from the Pulitzer Prize, Sheaffer was a three-time Guggenheim Fellowship recipient and received over ten fellowships from MacDowell.

== Early life and education ==
On October 18, 1912, Louis Sheaffer Slung was born in Louisville, Kentucky. He briefly went to the University of North Carolina for his post-secondary education in the early 1930s.

== Career ==
In 1934, Sheaffer began his career with the Brooklyn Eagle as a newspaper journalist. He joined the United States Army during World War II and resumed his tenure with the Eagle in 1946. Later on, Sheaffer was named the newspaper's film critic in 1947 and theater critic in 1949. Sheaffer remained with the Brooklyn Eagle as a theatre critic until the newspaper's closure in 1955. After leaving the newspaper, Sheaffer moved to the Circle in the Square Theatre and worked as a press agent for a year.

In 1956, Sheaffer started writing a two-part biography on playwright Eugene O'Neill. Sheaffer released the first part of his O'Neill biography, O'Neill: Son and Playwright, in 1968 and followed up with the second part, titled O'Neill: Son and Artist, in 1973. The following year, O'Neill: Son and Artist was awarded the 1974 Pulitzer Prize for Biography or Autobiography.

== Awards and honors ==
Studying theater arts, Sheaffer received his first Guggenheim Fellowship in 1959 and received additional fellowships in 1962 and 1969. In 1974, Sheaffer was nominated for the National Book Award for Biography for O'Neill: Son and Artist. From MacDowell, Sheaffer received over ten fellowships between 1970 and 1988.

== Death ==
Sheaffer died from heart failure in Long Island College Hospital on August 7, 1993.
