= Walt Zeboski =

American photographer and photojournalist

- Born: 1929
- Died: 12 November 2012 (aged 82–83); Sacramento, California, United States
- Known for: photographing Ronald Reagan during his 1980 presidential campaign
- Spouse: Virginia

Walt Zeboski (1929 – 12 November 2012) was an American photographer and photojournalist for the Associated Press for more than 30 years. Zeboski extensively photographed Ronald Reagan during his 1980 presidential campaign, snapping some of the most iconic pictures of Reagan's campaign. Zeboski, who often focused on California politics, covered the political terms of four consecutive governors of California from the 1960s to the 1980s - Pat Brown, Ronald Reagan, Jerry Brown, and George Deukmejian.

Zeboski joined the Associated Press in 1966. In addition to Reagan and the Californian governors, some of his more famous subjects included Cesar Chavez, the Black Panthers, and Senator George McGovern. He also photographed Queen Elizabeth II's 1983 visit to Yosemite National Park.

Walt Zeboski died on November 12, 2012, at the age of 83. He was a resident of Sacramento, California.
