= Market Square, Providence, Rhode Island =

Coordinates: 41.8261°N 71.4082°W

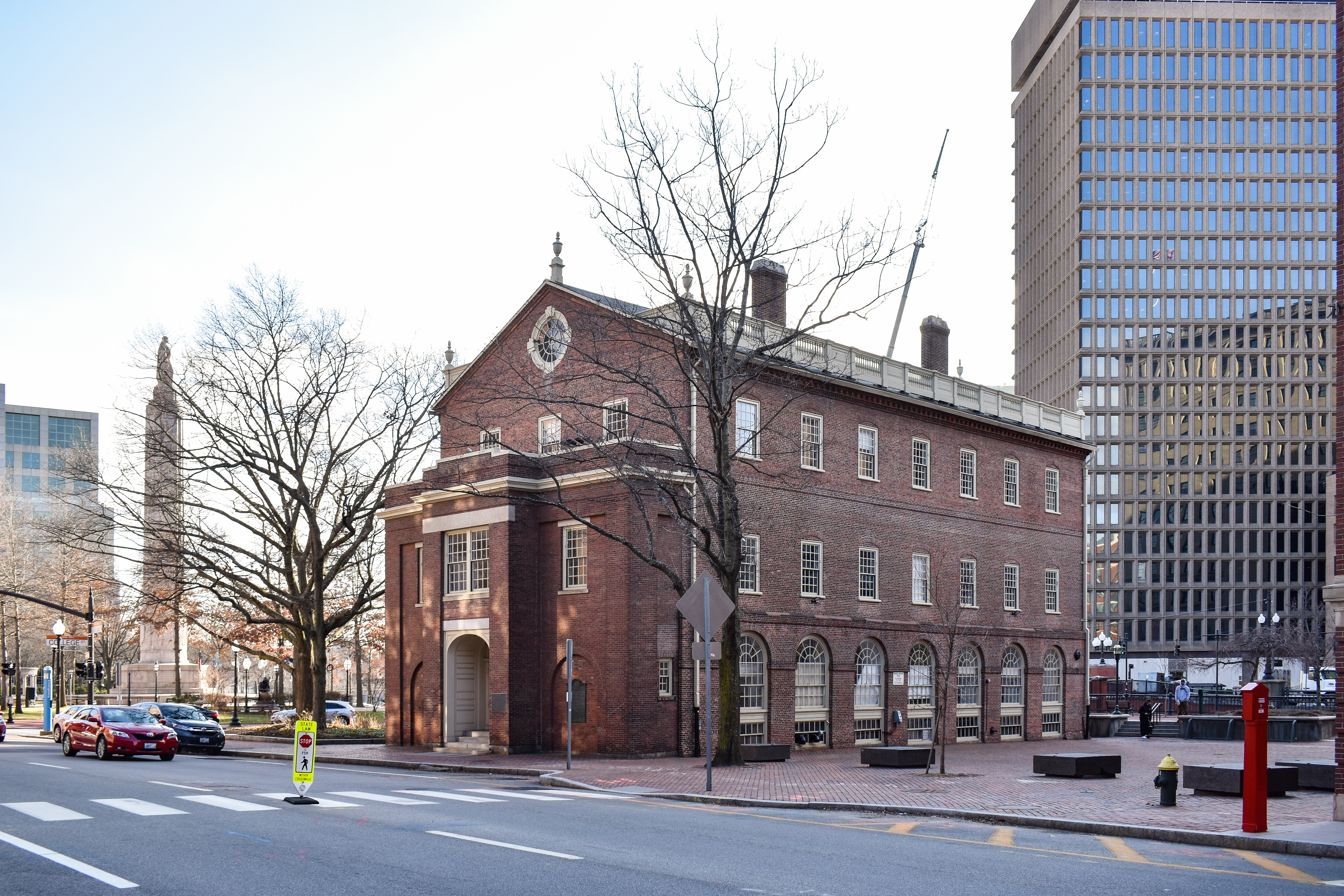
Market Square in 2021

Market Square is a market square in Providence, Rhode Island. It is located at the intersection of present-day North Main Street and College Street at the base of College Hill. Market Square has historically functioned as a commercial, civic, and cultural locus of Providence.

== History ==
=== Colonial era ===
In the 17th century the land comprising modern-day Market Square was originally owned by Chad Brown, progenitor of the Brown family, later affiliated with Brown University.

The square's origin lies in a 1738 order by the Providence Town Council, which established a highway 123 feet in width, extending from Towne Street (now South Main Street) to the Great Bridge. At the time, the area was known as the Town Parade.

In 1744, a Haymarket was organized at the site, establishing the square as a local center of commerce.

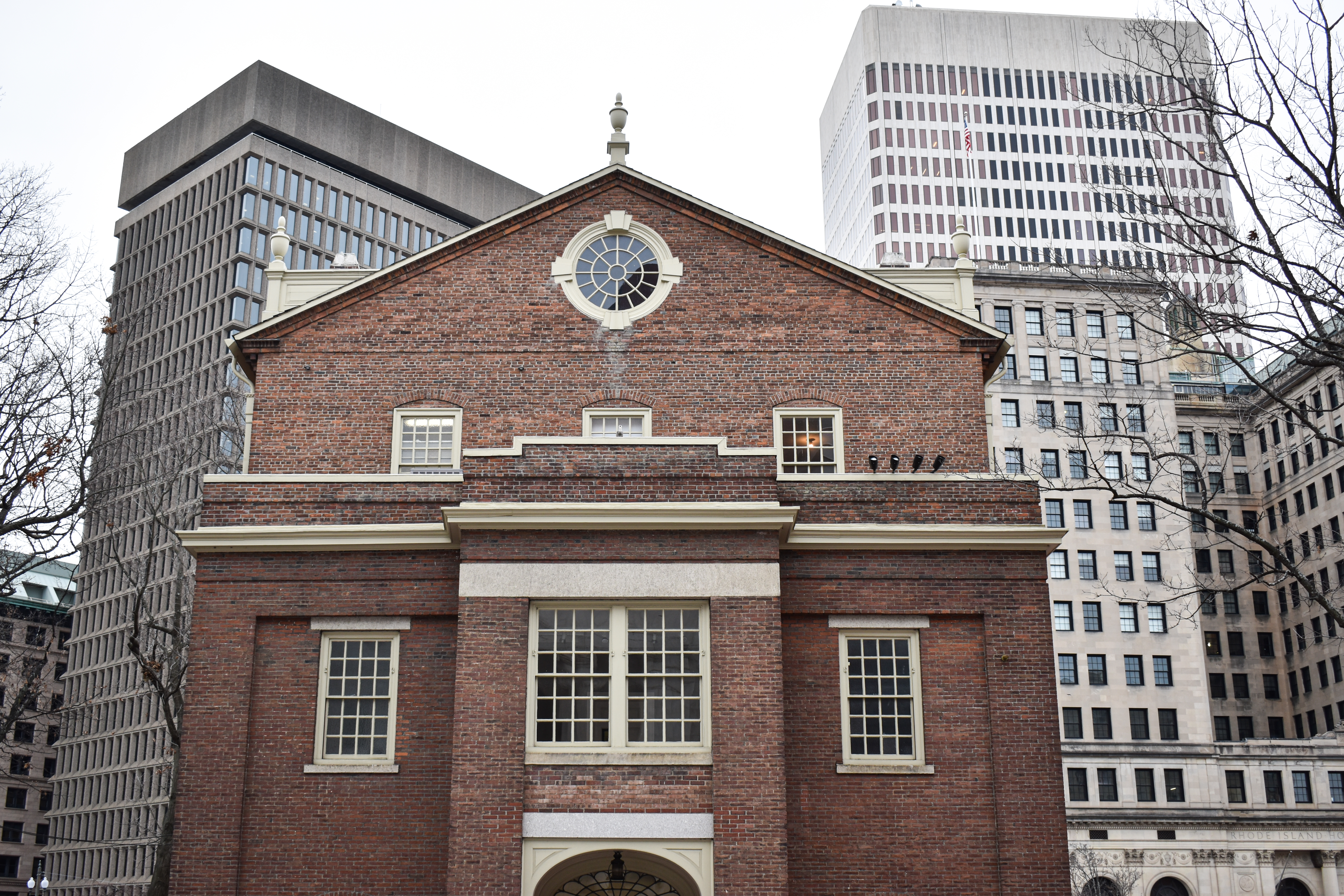
Today, Market House is the focal structure of Market Square

The square's focal structure, Market House, was constructed between 1773 and 1775.

On March 2, 1775, Providence residents, inspired by the then-recent Boston Tea Party, gathered in Market Square to protest the Tea Act. The colonists heaped a large pile of English tea in the center of the square, covering the mound with a barrel of tar and lighting it ablaze.

=== Black history ===
As the commercial hub of colonial Providence, Market Square has been suggested as the likely site of slave sales, which constituted a significant portion of commerce in the 18th century city. The identification of the site as a slave market, however, has not been confirmed by primary sources. Historical references to slave sales in Providence suggest that these transactions traditionally occurred in private, commercial establishments rather than in a central, public space.

Enslaved black laborers contributed to the 1775 construction of Market House. Among these laborers was Pero Paget, a stonemason who also worked to build nearby University Hall at Brown University

In the 18th and 19th centuries, Market Square served as an important commercial venue for free Black entrepreneurs in the city.

=== 19th century ===
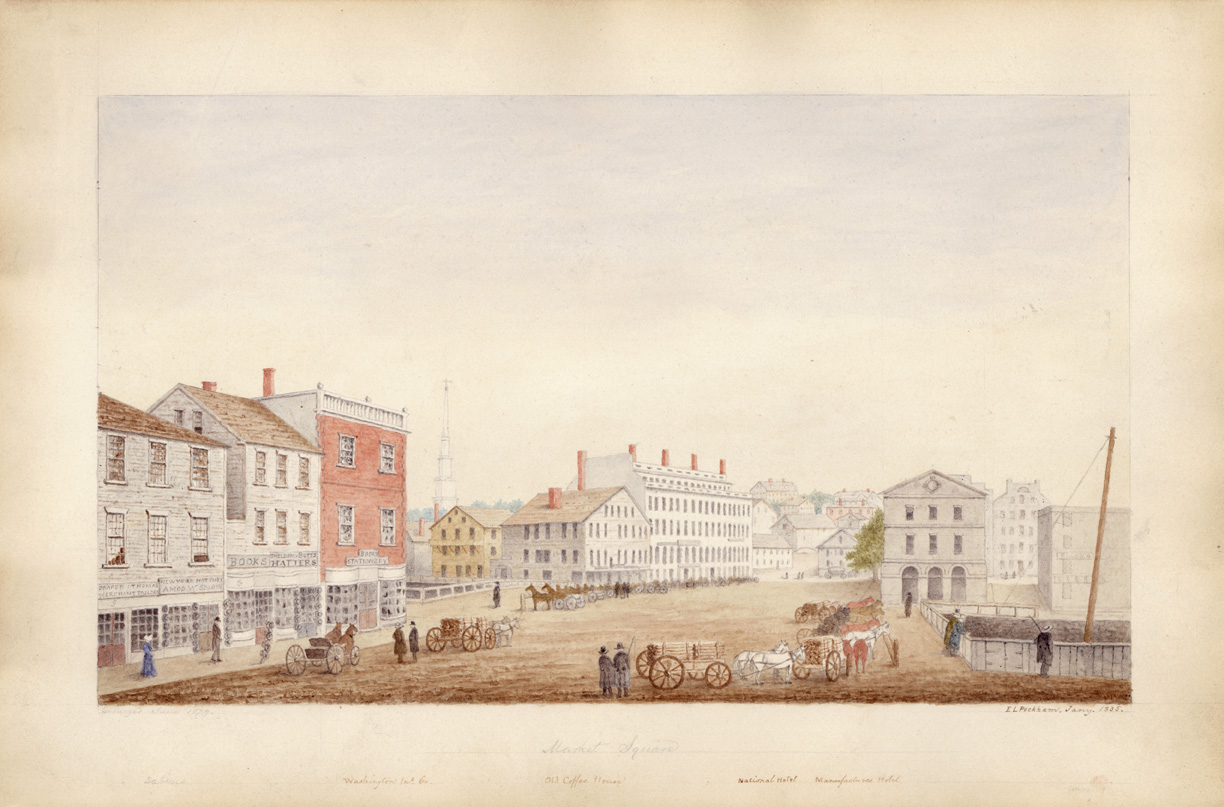
"Market Square" (1835) by Edward Lewis Peckham

In June 1843, President John Tyler toured New England while considering a potential third-party bid for re-election. One of Tyler's several Providence stops was at Market Square. The president enjoyed a meal at the Franklin House, an inn across from the Market House.

The 1847 construction of Union Station effectively shifted the city's commercial center to Exchange Place in Downtown Providence.

During the Civil War, Market Square was the site of several public "war meetings" presided by mayor Jabez C. Knight. During these meetings, public officials and dignitaries made public announcements and attempted to build up enlistment and support for the Union side during the war.

One such meeting was held in August 1862 to announce the Militia Act of 1862, which gave the state authority to draft. The act also allowed African Americans to participate in the war as soldiers and war laborers. The announcement was received with "loud cheers." Governor William Sprague IV called for "colored citizens" to form a regiment, and promised to personally accompany this regiment into battle. In July 1863, after the Enrollment Act established a national draft, a blindfolded official selected names of conscripted men from a wheel in Market Square.

In 1882 the first electric arc lights in Providence were installed by the Rhode Island Electric Lighting Company on Market Square and Westminster Street.

On September 7 (or September 8), 1897, the anarchist and feminist Emma Goldman was arrested for "unlawful open air speaking" and "attracting a crowd" when she attempted to speak in at Market Square, during a four-month lecture tour. The mayor of Providence had warned Goldman that she would be arrested if she spoke in Providence. She had been traveling to lecture on topics such as "Why I am an Anarchist-Communist," "Woman", "Marriage", the recent assassination of the Spanish Premier, and a speech "Berkman's Unjust Sentence," about Alexander Berkman's imprisonment for the murder of Henry Clay Frick. After jailing Goldman overnight, the Providence authorities ordered her to leave town within 24 hours, or else face three months imprisonment.

=== RISD ===
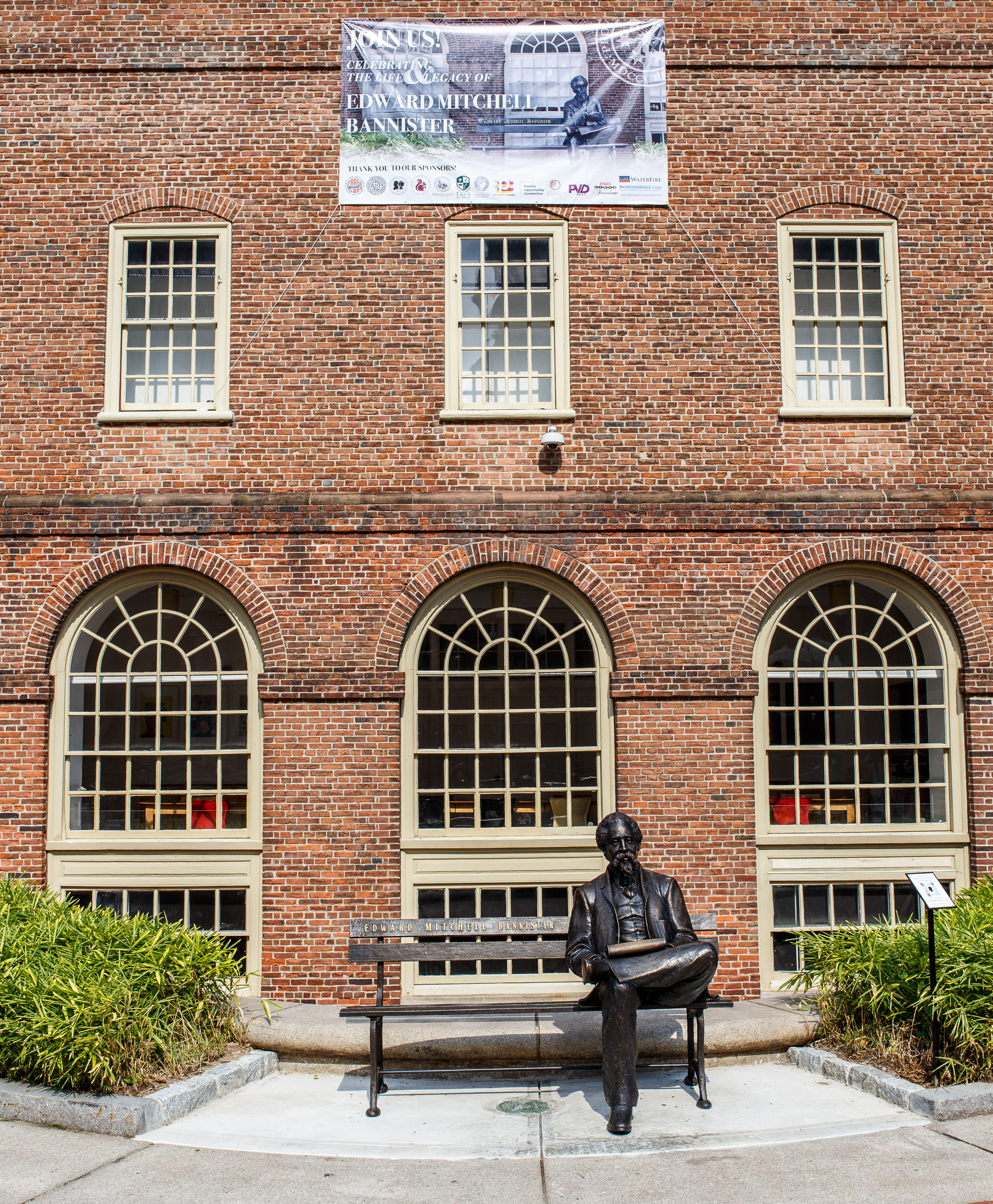
Bannister statue

Market House was acquired by Rhode Island School of Design (RISD) in 1948; Market Square is currently surrounded by the school's urban campus.

In 2016 Market Square was the site of a student organized protest 'Not Your Token' decrying racism and elitism on campus. Student organizers from Black Artists and Designers, created a list of mandates, which included increased hiring and retainment of faculty of color, faculty trainings and curricular changes. Protestors also demanded a memorial be erected in Market Square, acknowledging the site's purported associations with slavery and honoring victims of slavery in Rhode Island.

In September 2023, a bronze sculpture of Providence artist Edward Mitchell Bannister by local sculptor Gage Prentiss was unveiled in Market Square. Bannister is depicted as life size, sitting on a bench.

== Gallery ==
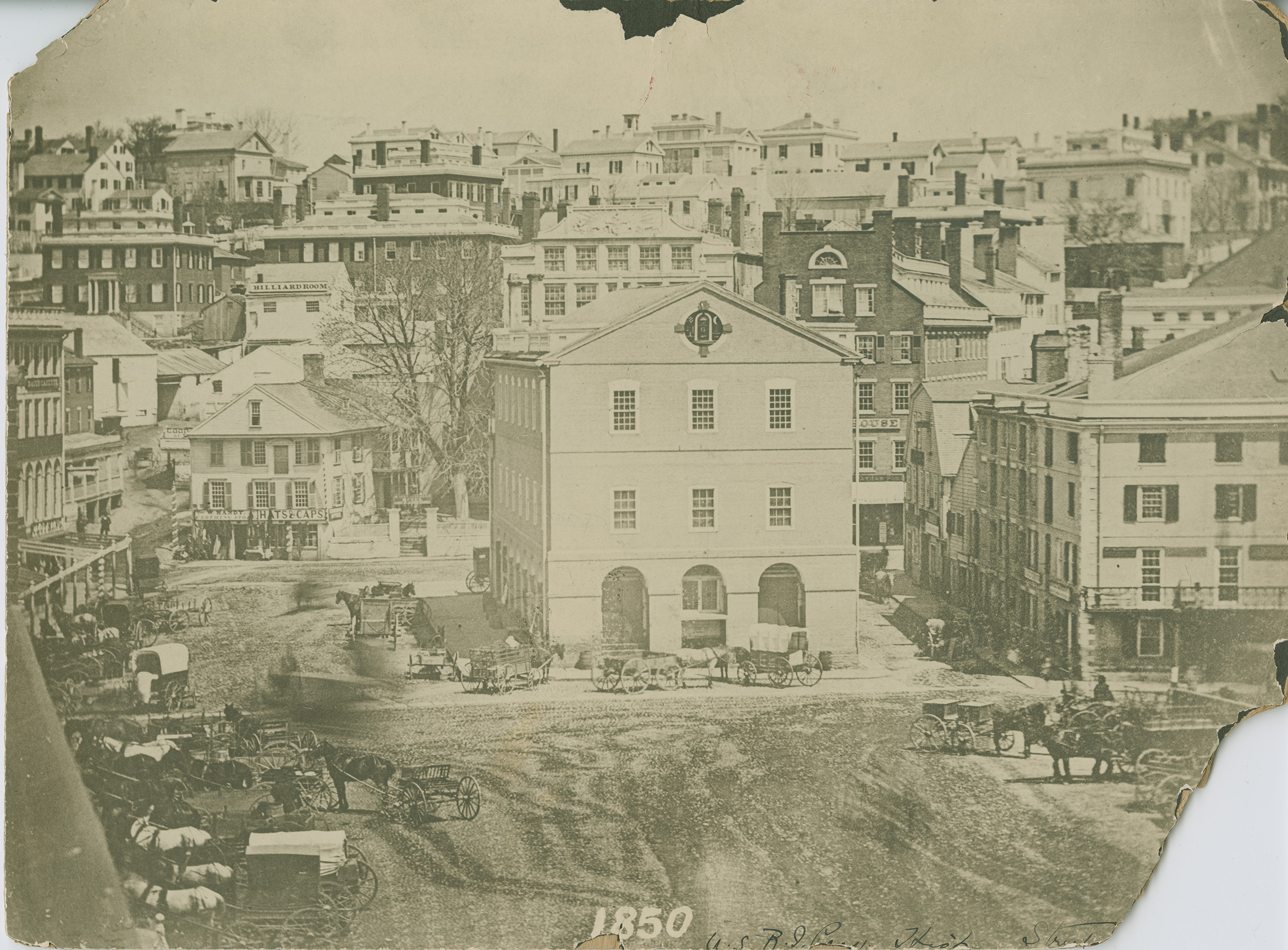
Market Square in 1844

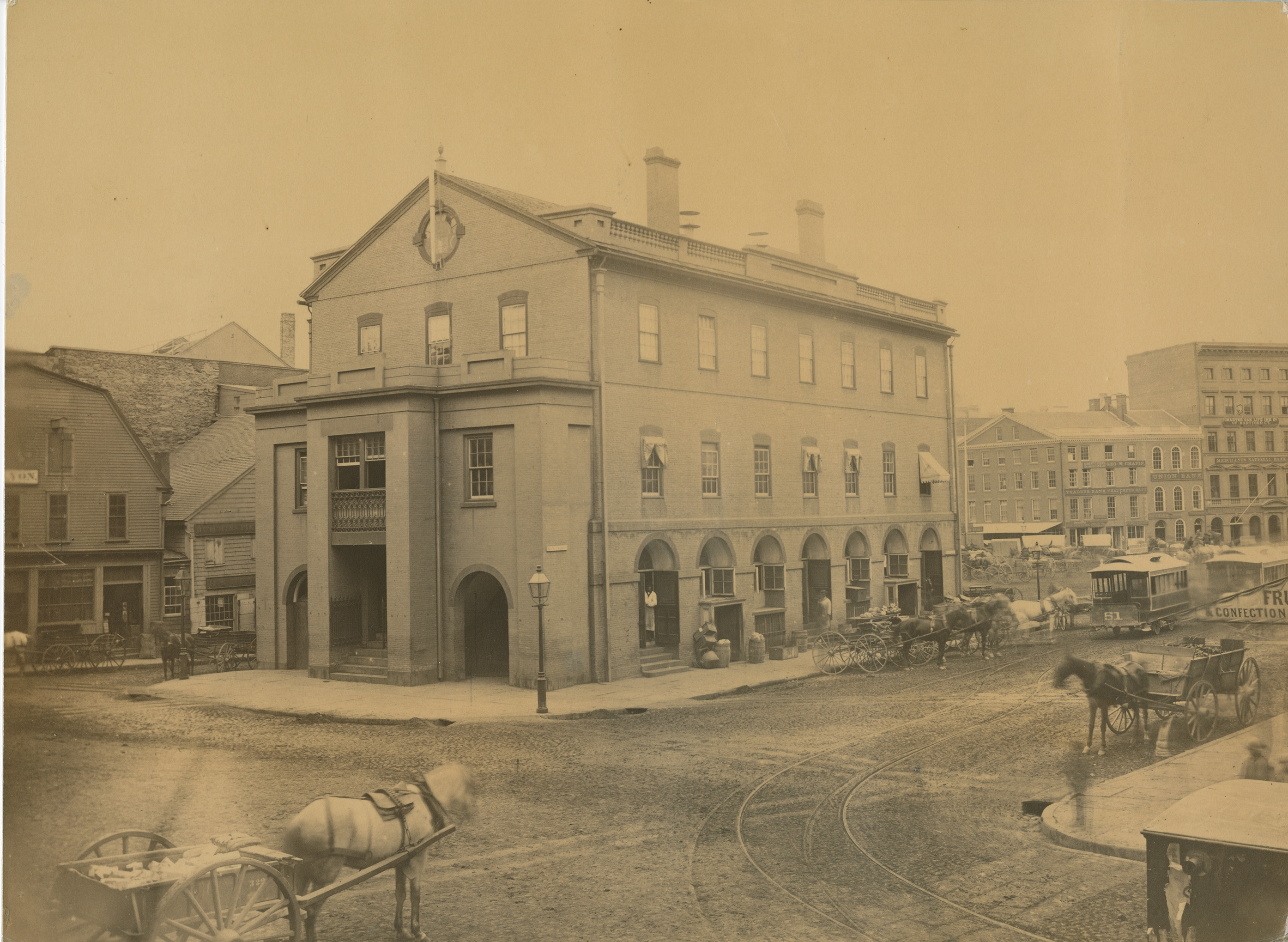
Market Square c.1860

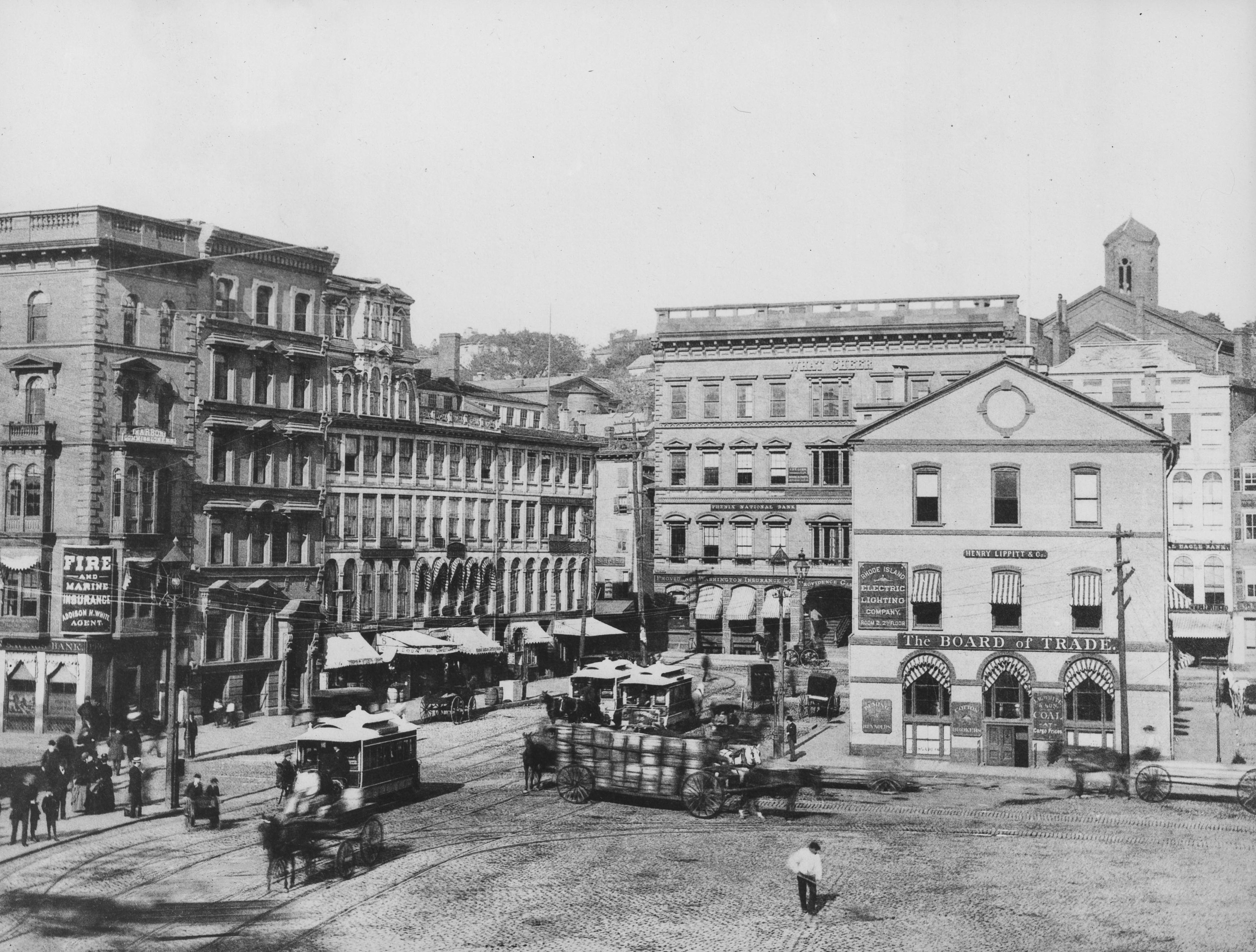
Market Square in 1883

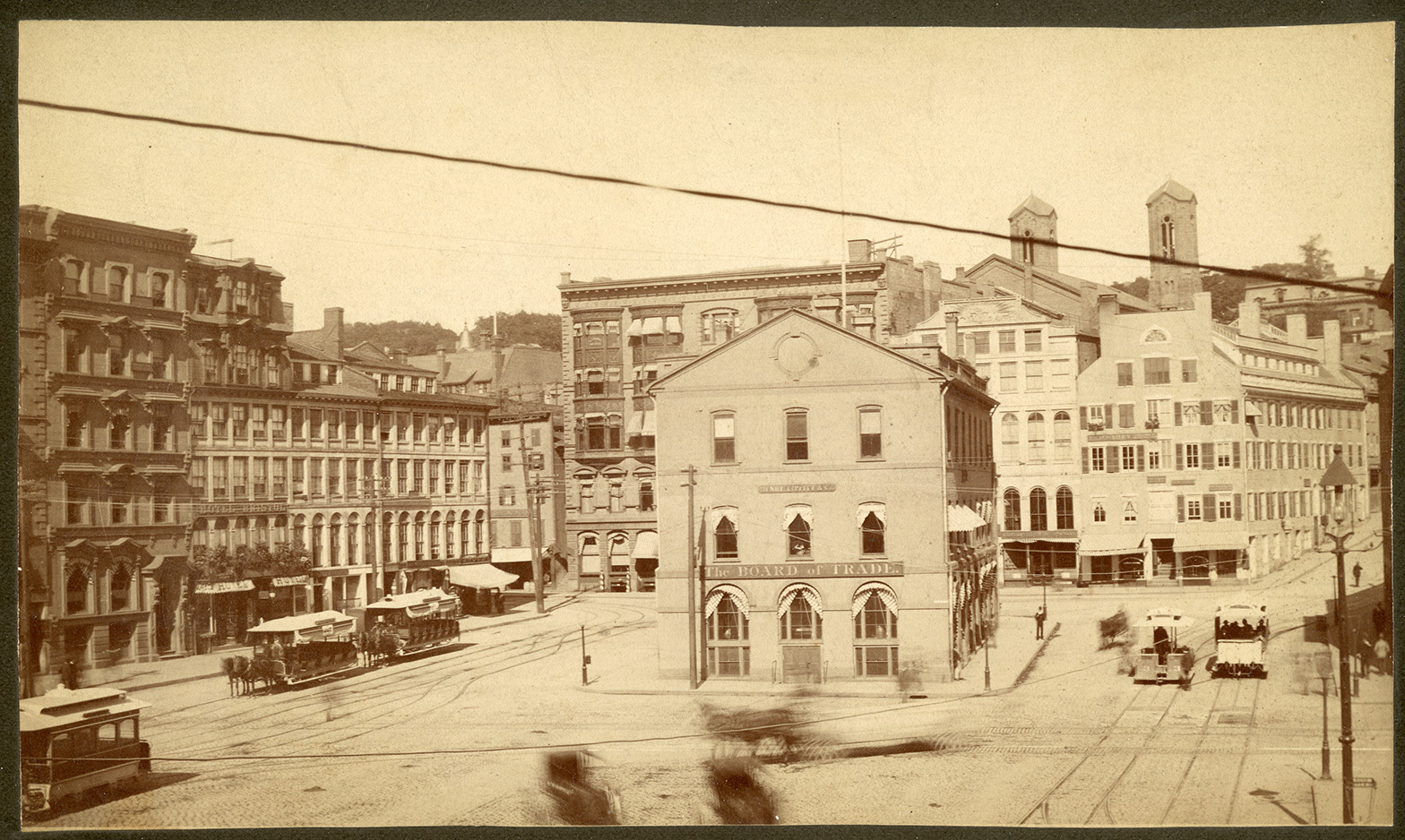
Market Square c. 1890

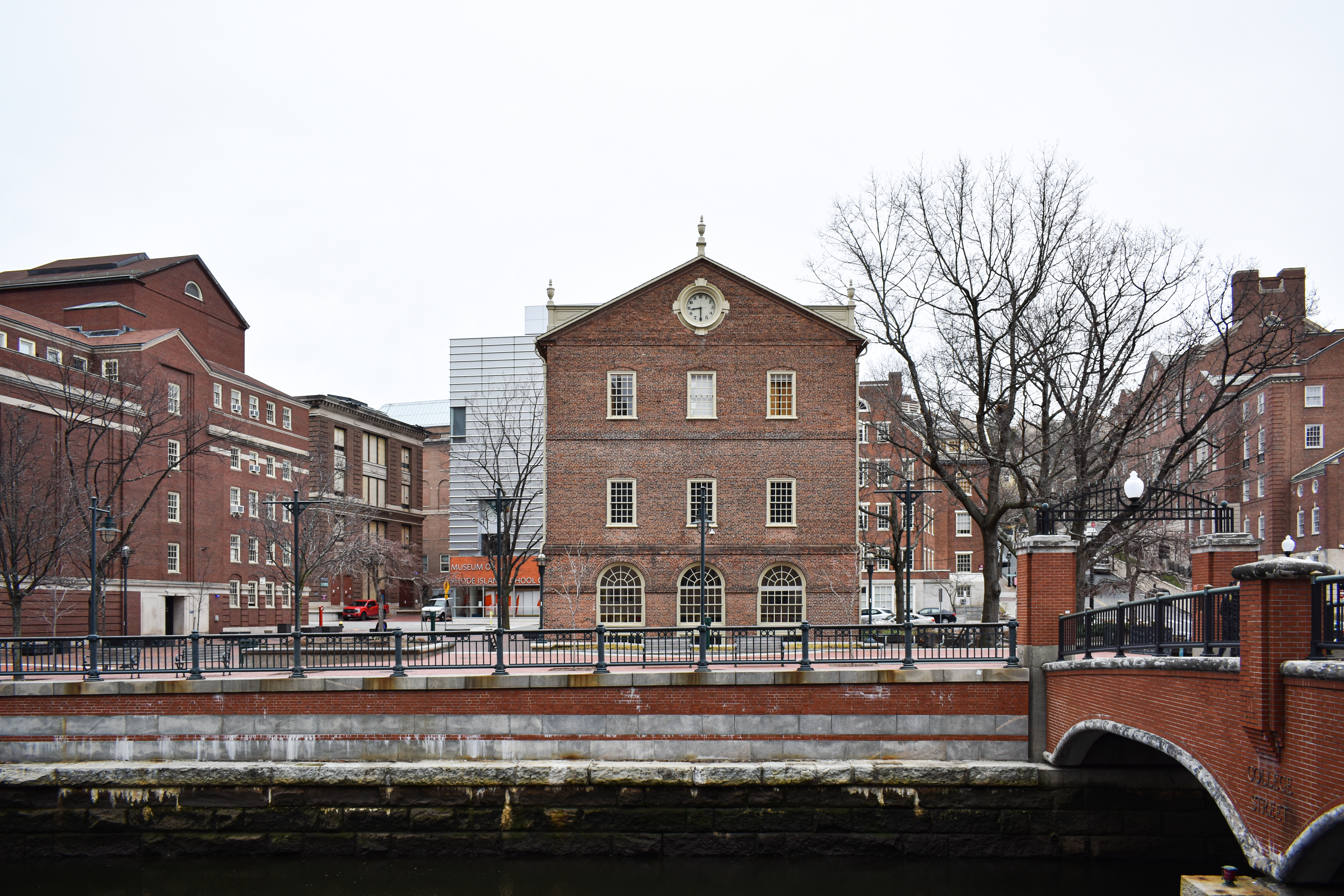
Market Square in 2021

== See also ==
- Market House (Providence, Rhode Island)
- Kennedy Plaza
