= Slava Veder =

American photojournalist (1926–2026)

- Born: Yaroslav John Veder; August 30, 1926; Berkeley, California, U.S.
- Died: August 22, 2026 (aged 99); El Dorado Hills, California, U.S.
- Occupation: Photojournalist
- Employer: Associated Press (AP)
- Known for: Burst of Joy (1973)
- Awards: Pulitzer Prize for Feature Photography (1974)

Yaroslav John "Sal" Veder (August 30, 1926 – August 22, 2026) was an American photojournalist who worked for the Associated Press (AP). He is best known for photographing the Vietnam War–era POW homecoming image commonly titled Burst of Joy, taken at Travis Air Force Base on March 17, 1973. The photograph won the 1974 Pulitzer Prize for Feature Photography.

== Early life ==
Veder was born in Berkeley, California, on August 30, 1926, the son of Russian immigrants Ivan and Anka (née Isvoschikova) Vedernikov, who later changed their names to John and Ann Veder. In a 2015 interview, he described himself as largely self-taught and said he began his reporting career in local journalism before moving into photography. A North Carolina State University Libraries exhibit summary describes Veder working for several California newspapers and later returning to California after a period working for the Tulsa World and the Oakland Tribune before his Pulitzer-winning period at the Associated Press.

== Career ==
Veder worked as a staff photographer for the Associated Press and covered a wide range of assignments during the 1960s and 1970s, including major disasters and national events. He spent much of the Vietnam era covering antiwar demonstrations in the San Francisco Bay Area and was among many journalists photographing POW returns at Travis Air Force Base in 1973.

Veder's credited AP photojournalism also includes coverage of San Francisco political and civic life. For example, a Bay Area Reporter retrospective on a San Francisco International Airport exhibition notes an AP photograph by Veder capturing Harvey Milk on election night in 1978 during the campaign against California Proposition 6.

== Iconic photographs ==
=== Burst of Joy (1973) ===
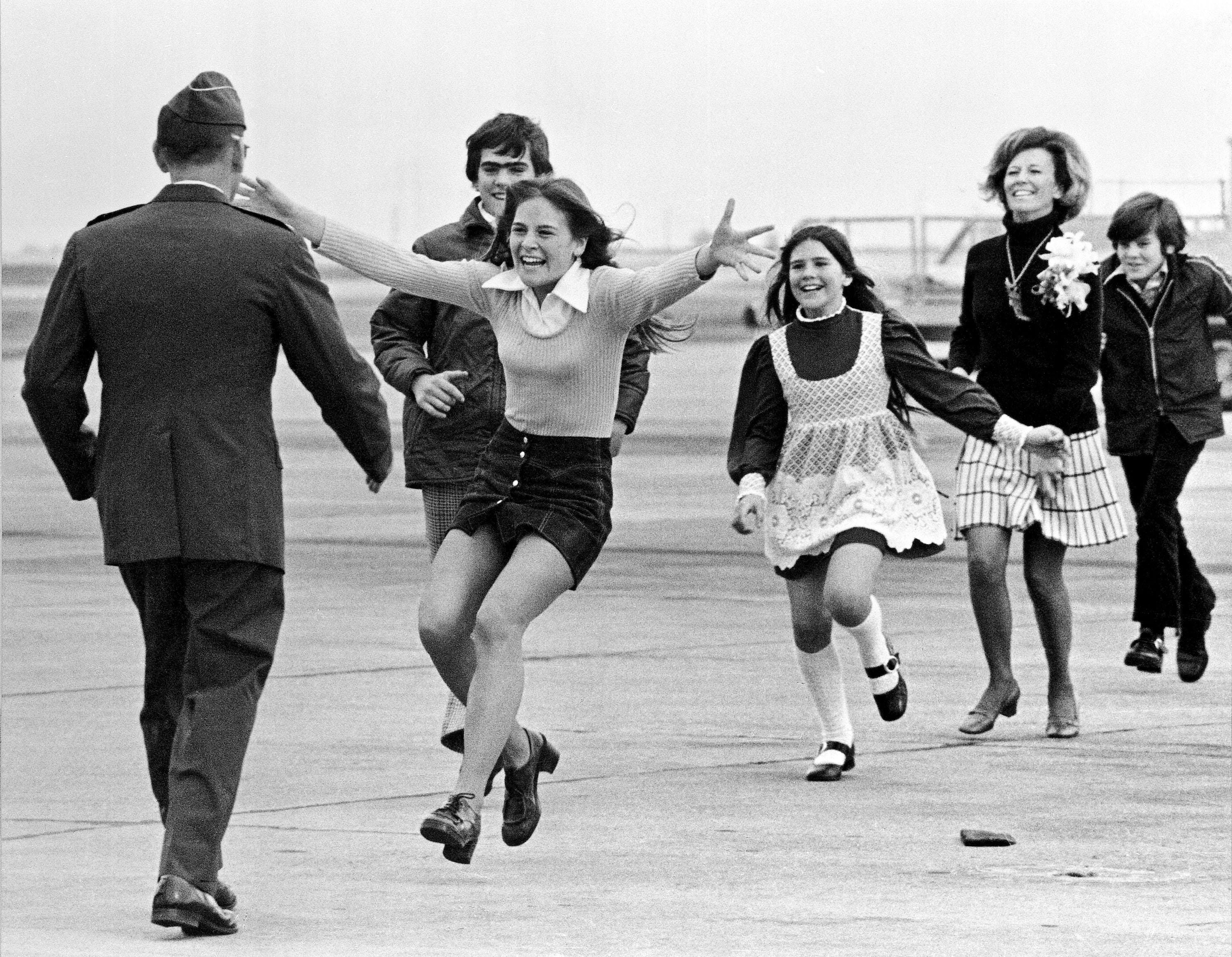
Burst of Joy

On March 17, 1973, Veder photographed U.S. Air Force Lt. Col. Robert L. Stirm reuniting with his family after Stirm’s release as a POW from North Vietnam; Stirm's daughter Lorrie Stirm is pictured running toward him with her arms outstretched, which became the central visual motif of the image later titled Burst of Joy. World Press Photo's contest archive records the photograph's date, AP affiliation, and the POW return context (including Operation Homecoming timelines). Robert Stirm had, despite the happiness depicted in the photograph, gone through a breakdown in his marriage.

Veder processed images on base using an improvised darkroom setup. Burst of Joy is a gelatin silver print.

== Later life, death and legacy ==
A 1998 report on Bay Area winners in the World Press Photo annual show described Veder as a retired Associated Press photographer living in the Sierra foothills near Placerville, California, and reported his expressing uncertainty about why his image prevailed among those taken by many other photographers present at the scene at Travis Air Force Base in 1973. An NCSU Libraries exhibit text states that Veder, after retiring, volunteered with the California Department of Forestry and Fire Protection. Veder died at his home in El Dorado Hills, California, on August 22, 2026, at the age of 99, eight days short of his 100th birthday.

== Awards and recognition ==
Veder received the 1974 Pulitzer Prize for Feature Photography for his POW homecoming image (commonly known as Burst of Joy). The photograph is also listed in the World Press Photo contest archive as a 1st prize winner in the Humor category of the 1974 Photo Contest.
