= Joseph Ungaro =

American journalist (1930–2006)

- Born: Joseph M. Ungaro; November 4, 1930
- Died: November 12, 2006 (aged 76)
- Education: Providence College; Columbia University
- Occupation: Journalist
- Known for: Asking the question eliciting Richard Nixon's "I am not a crook." reply

Joseph M. Ungaro (November 4, 1930 – November 12, 2006) was an American journalist most famous for his question to President Richard Nixon which elicited the reply "I am not a crook."

== Early career ==
Ungaro graduated from Providence College and the Columbia University Graduate School of Journalism.

In 1950 he began working for The Providence Journal and Evening Bulletin first as a copy boy, and then as a reporter, managing editor, and publisher.

== The Question ==
On November 17, 1973, at the annual Associated Press Managing Editors convention in Orlando, Florida, Ungaro asked Nixon about his reported underpayment of income taxes in 1970 and 1971. Nixon's famous declaration came after he answered a subsequent question about the Watergate scandal, posed by then president of the association Dick Smyser of Oak Ridge, Tennessee's The Oak Ridger. At the end of that reply, Nixon doubled back to Ungaro's question, saying: "I welcome this kind of examination because people have got to know whether or not their president is a crook. Well, I’m not a crook."

Nixon later agreed to pay hundreds of thousands of dollars in back taxes.

== Later career ==
Ungaro left the Evening Bulletin later that year and began working at Gannett Company's Westchester Rockland Newspapers in 1974 as managing editor. He later became vice president and executive editor, vice president and general manager, and then president and publisher. He was given the additional responsibilities as vice president of the Metro Newspaper Division.

He later became president and chief executive of the Detroit Newspaper Agency, the company that managed a joint operating agreement between The Detroit News and the Detroit Free Press.

Ungaro's final position was at Stars and Stripes, where he put together a consolidation plan for the newspaper and then became its ombudsman.

== Sources ==
- Joseph Ungaro, former Journal News publisher, dies at 76 The Journal News 14 November 2006.
- Joseph Ungaro, 76, News Executive Who Elicited Nixon’s ‘Not a Crook’ Line, Dies New York Times 14 November 2006.
