= 1949 Pulitzer Prize =

Awards for journalism and related fields

The following are the Pulitzer Prizes for 1949.

== Journalism awards ==
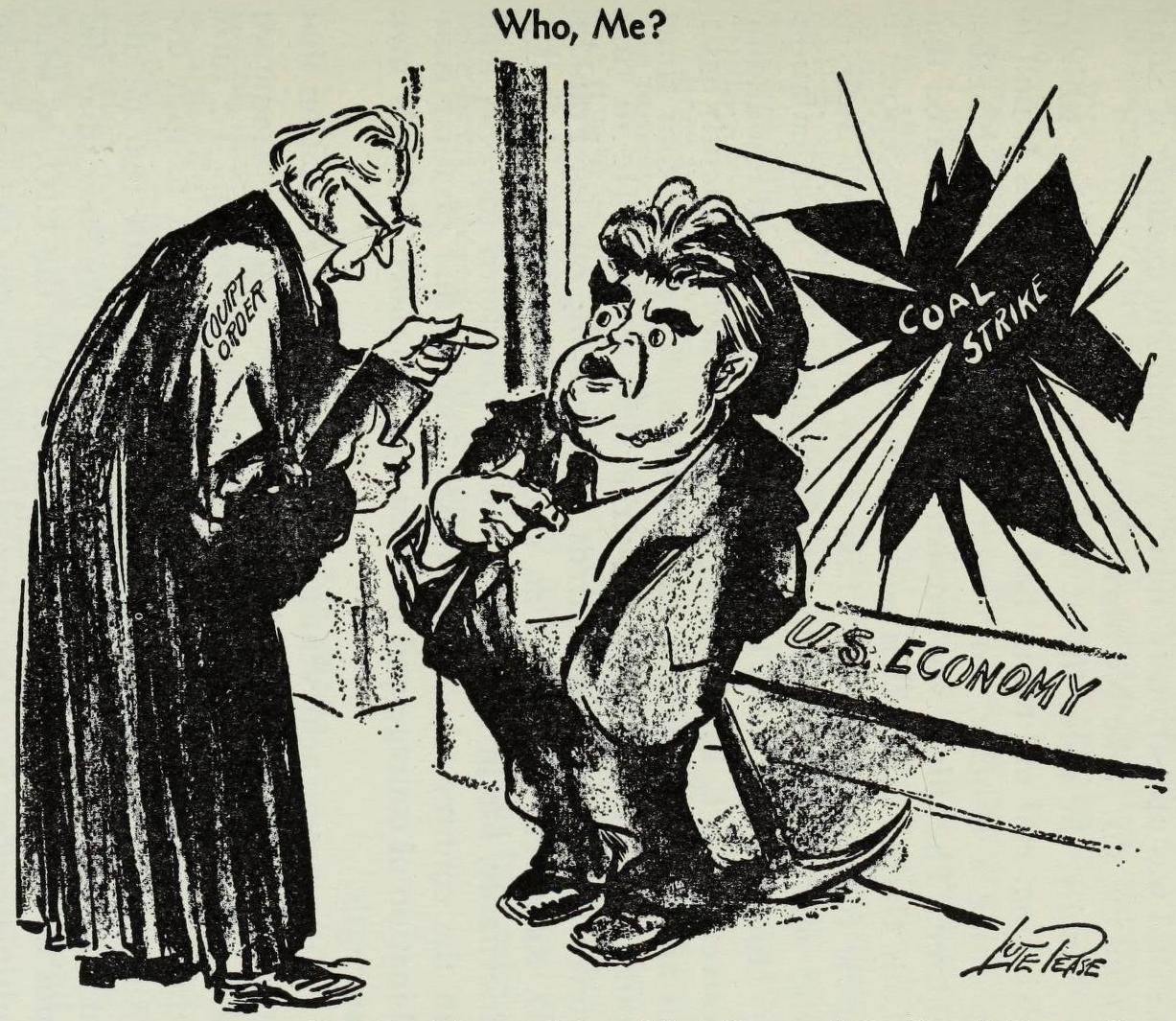
The winning editorial cartoon, "Who, Me?"

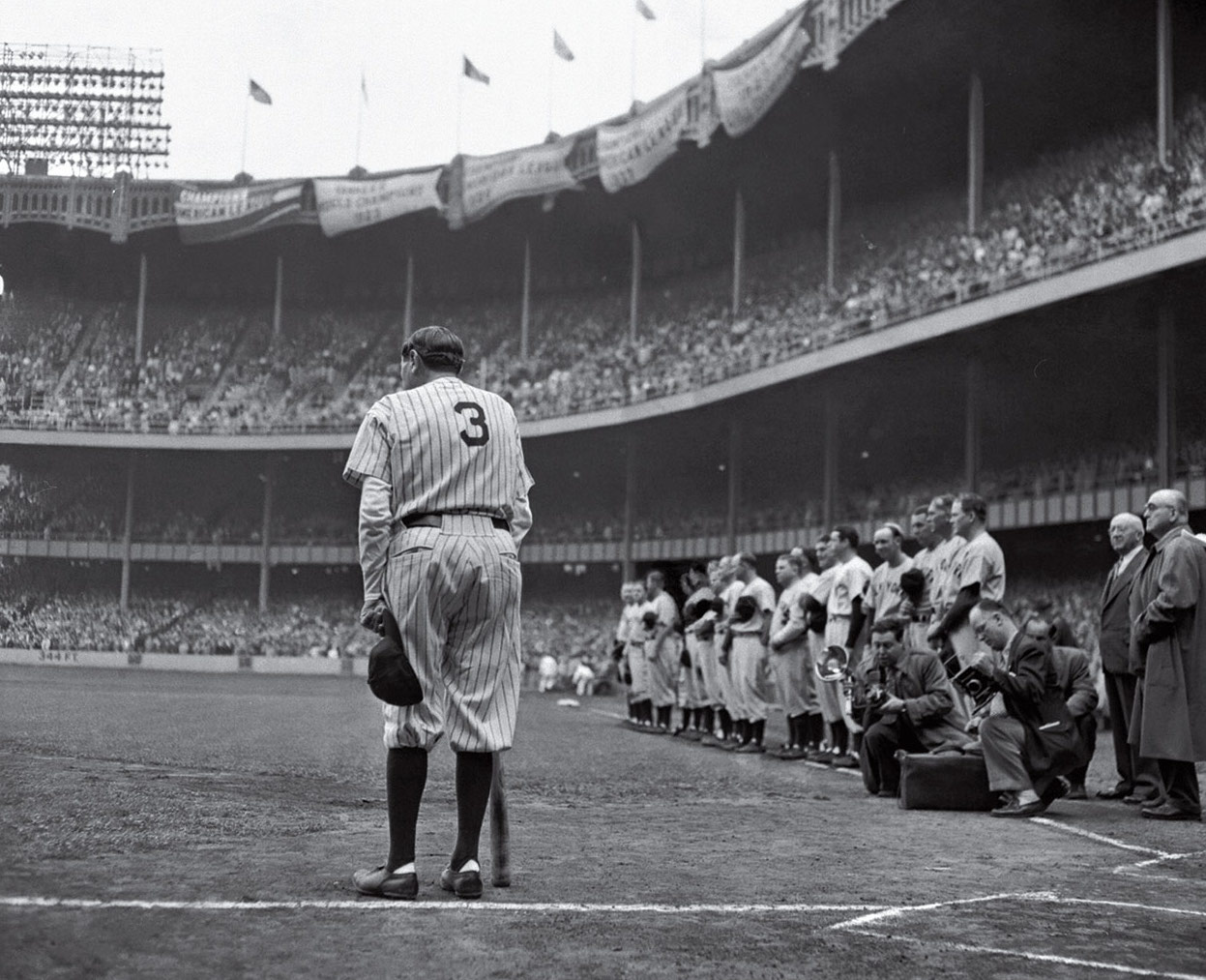
The winning photograph, "Babe Ruth Bows Out"

- Public Service:
  - Nebraska State Journal for the campaign establishing the "Nebraska All-Star Primary" presidential preference primary which spotlighted, through a bi-partisan committee, issues early in the presidential campaign.
- Local Reporting:
  - Malcolm Johnson of The Sun (New York) for his series of 24 articles entitled "Crime on the Waterfront" in New York City.
- National Reporting:
  - C. P. Trussell of The New York Times for consistent excellence covering the national scene from Washington.
- International Reporting:
  - Price Day of The Baltimore Sun for his series of 12 articles entitled, "Experiment in Freedom: India and Its First Year of Independence".
- Editorial Writing:
  - Herbert Elliston of The Washington Post for distinguished editorial writing during the year.
  - John H. Crider of the Boston Herald for distinguished editorial writing during the year.
- Editorial Cartooning:
  - Lute Pease of the Newark Evening News for "Who, Me?"
- Photography:
  - Nathaniel Fein of the New York Herald-Tribune for his photo, "Babe Ruth Bows Out".

== Letters, Drama and Music Awards ==
- Fiction:
  - Guard of Honor by James Gould Cozzens (Harcourt).
- Drama:
  - Death of a Salesman by Arthur Miller (Viking).
- History:
  - The Disruption of American Democracy by Roy Franklin Nichols.
- Biography or Autobiography:
  - Roosevelt and Hopkins by Robert E. Sherwood.
- Poetry:
  - Terror and Decorum by Peter Viereck.
- Music:
  - Music for the film Louisiana Story by Virgil Thomson (G. Schirmer) released in 1948 by Robert J. Flaherty Productions.
