= 1944 Pulitzer Prize =

Awards for journalism and related fields

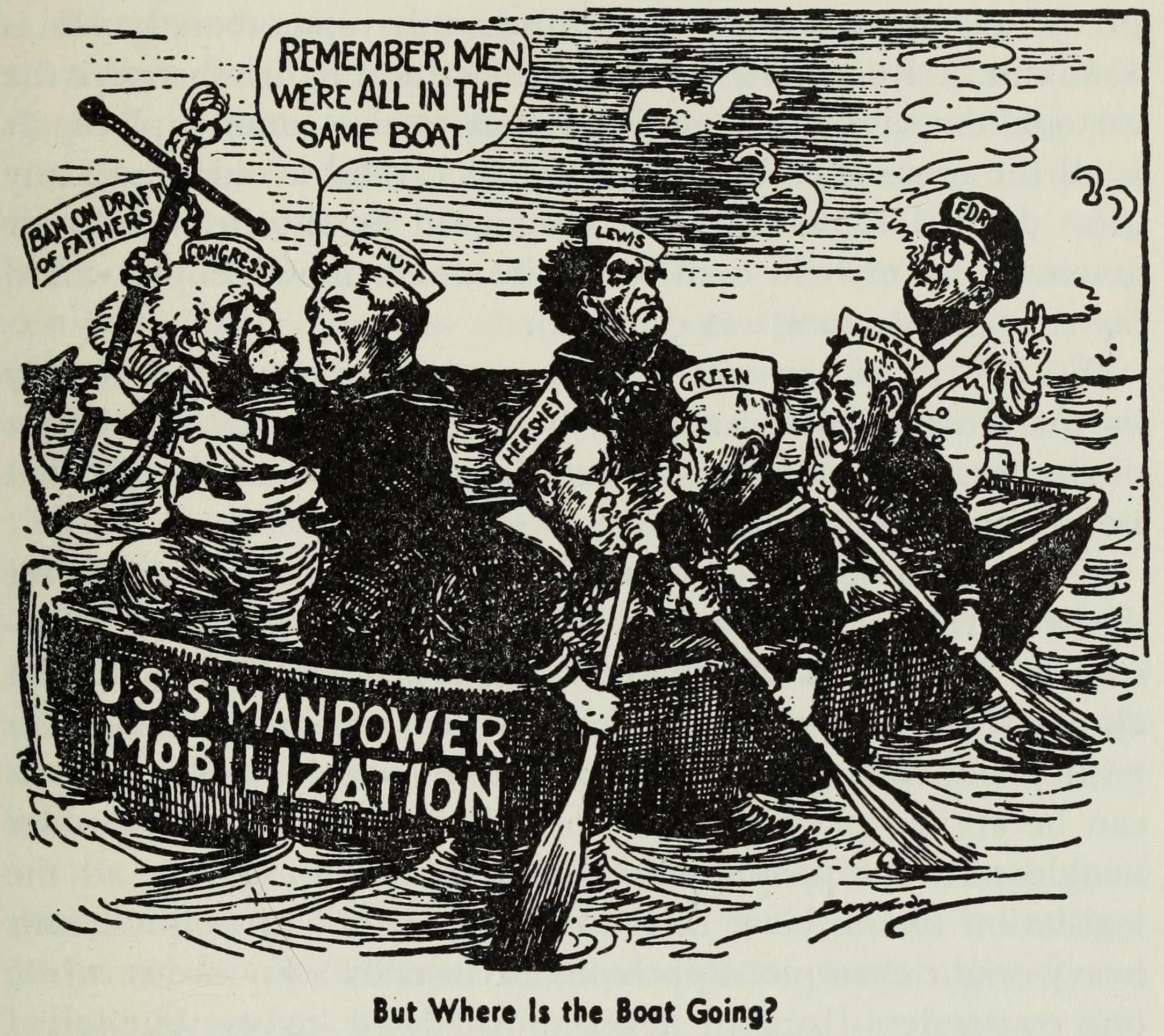
"But Where Is the Boat Going?", the prize-winning editorial cartoon

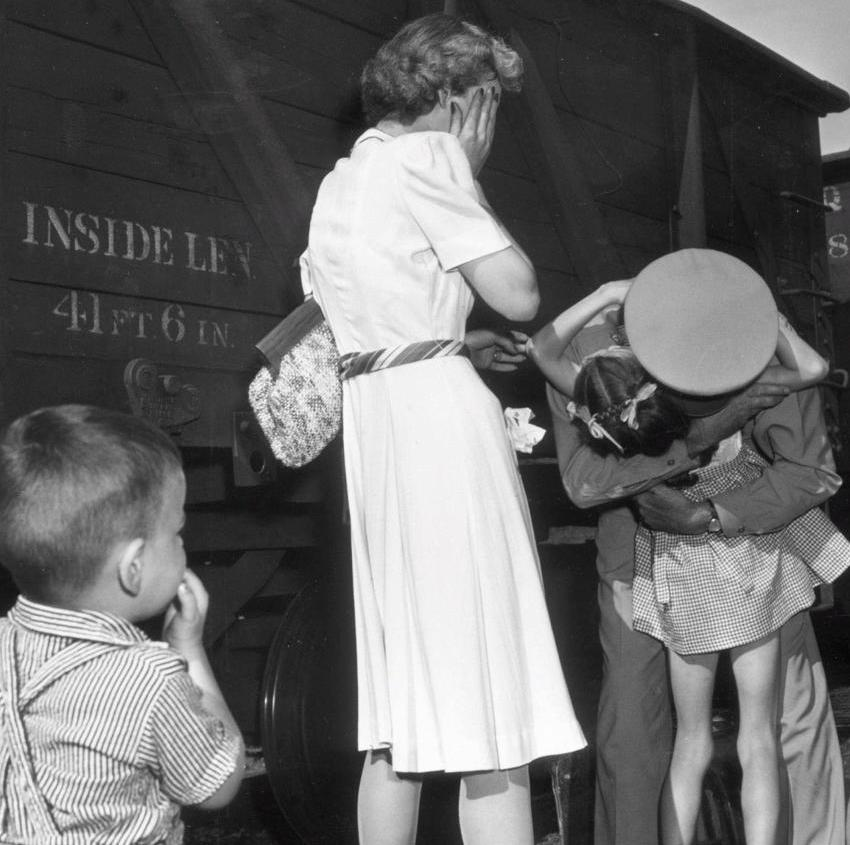
"Homecoming", one of the prize-winning photographs

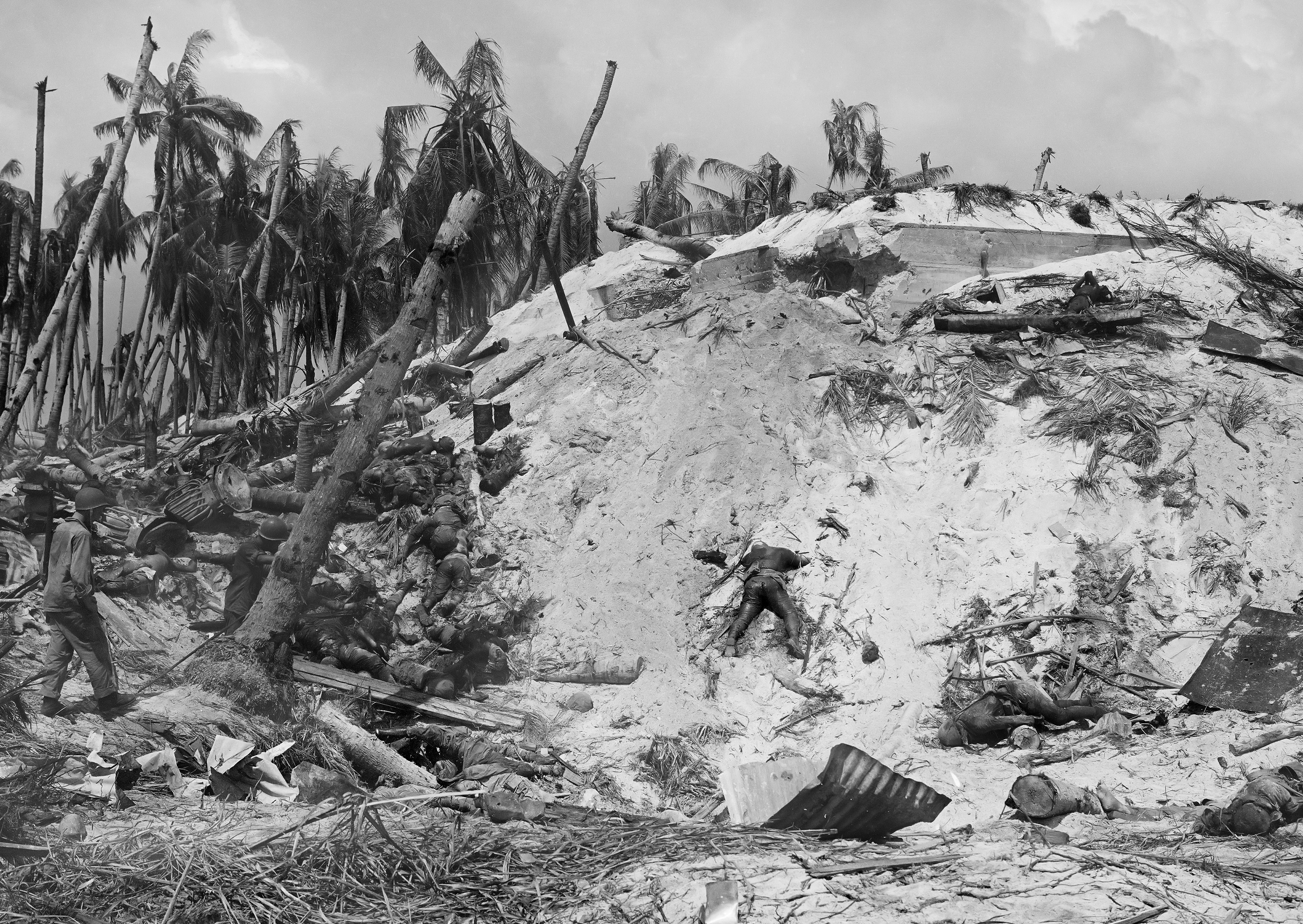
"Tarawa Island", the other prize-winning photograph

The following are the Pulitzer Prizes for 1944.

== Journalism awards ==
- Public Service:
  - The New York Times for its survey of the teaching of American history, coordinated by Benjamin Fine.
- Reporting:
  - Paul Schoenstein and associates of the New York Journal American, for a news story published on August 12, 1943, which saved the life of a two-year-old girl in the Lutheran Hospital of New York City by obtaining penicillin.
- Correspondence:
  - Ernest Taylor Pyle of the Scripps-Howard Newspaper Alliance, for distinguished war correspondence during the year 1943.
- Telegraphic Reporting (National):
  - Dewey L. Fleming of The Baltimore Sun, for his distinguished reporting during the year 1943.
- Telegraphic Reporting (International):
  - Daniel De Luce of the Associated Press, for his distinguished reporting during the year 1943.
- Editorial Writing:
  - Henry J. Haskell of The Kansas City Star, for editorials written during the calendar year 1943.
- Editorial Cartooning:
  - Clifford K. Berryman of the Evening Star (Washington D.C.), for "But Where Is the Boat Going?"
- Photography:
  - Earle L. Bunker of the Omaha World-Herald, for his photo entitled, "Homecoming".
  - Frank Filan of the Associated Press, for his photo at the Battle of Tarawa entitled "Tarawa Island".
- Special Citations:
  - Byron Price, Director of the Office of Censorship, for the creation and administration of the newspaper and radio codes.
  - William Allen White was honored with a scroll indicating appreciation of his services for seven years as a member of the Pulitzer Prize advisory board, presented posthumously to his widow.

== Letters, Drama and Music Awards ==
- Novel:
  - Journey in the Dark by Martin Flavin (Harper).
- Drama:
  - No award given
- History:
  - The Growth of American Thought by Merle Curti (Harper).
- Biography or Autobiography:
  - The American Leonardo: The Life of Samuel F. B. Morse by Carleton Mabee (Knopf).
- Poetry:
  - Western Star by Stephen Vincent Benét (Farrar).
- Music:
  - Symphony No. 4. Opus 34 by Howard Hanson (Eastman School of Music). Performed by the Boston Symphony Orchestra on December 3, 1943.
- Special Award:
  - In lieu of the Drama prize, a special award was given to Richard Rodgers and Oscar Hammerstein II, for Oklahoma!
