= Homecoming (photograph) =

1944 Pulitzer Prize–winning photograph

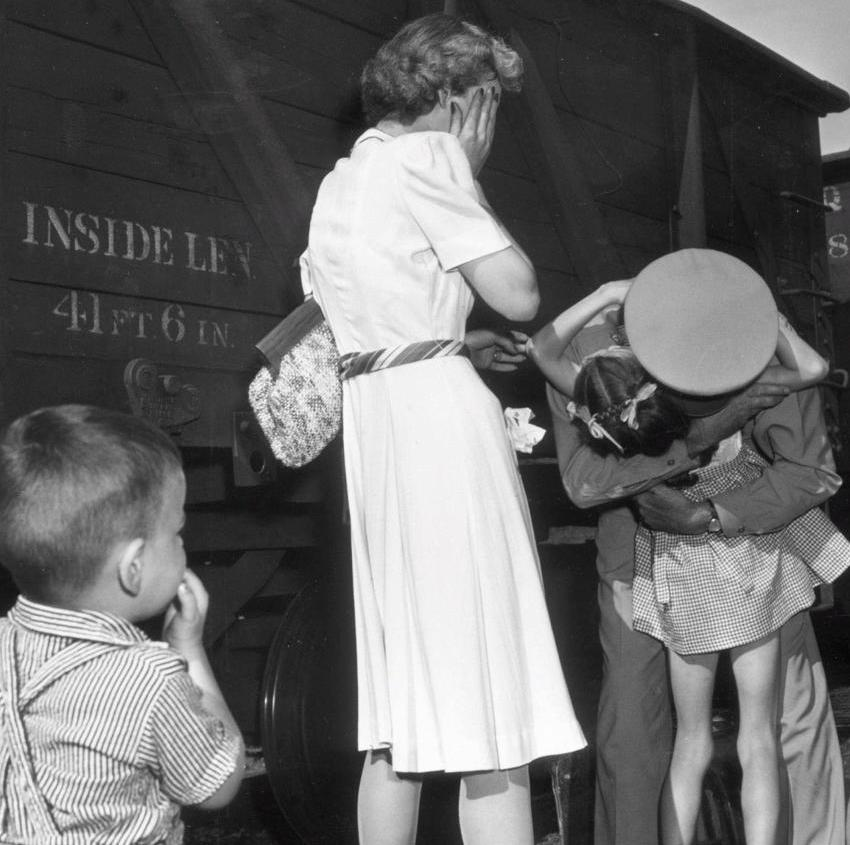
- Artist: Earle Bunker
- Completion date: July 15, 1943
- Medium: Photograph

Homecoming is a 1943 photograph of an American soldier returning from active service in World War II. The image was captured by Earle Bunker and it won the 1944 Pulitzer Prize for Photography. The image also won a national Associated Press news photo contest and it was featured in Life, Time and Newsweek.

== History ==
On July 15, 1943, in Villisca, Iowa, many of the town's 1,100 residents gathered at the train station to welcome Lieutenant Colonel Robert Moore home from duty in World War II. Among them was Omaha World-Herald photographer Earle Bunker, who had been waiting at the station to capture the homecoming. When his initial photo was marred by a failed flashbulb, Bunker quickly replaced the bulb and captured the prize-winning photograph of Moore's emotional reunion with his daughter. Bunker later said that he waited almost 24 hours to photograph the moment.

In December 1942, Moore received the Silver Star for gallantry for his action in Algeria. On February 17, 1943, Moore led a battalion of Iowa natives in a battle at Faid Pass. On July 10, 1943, Moore's wife received the news that her husband would be returning home.

=== Pulitzer Prize ===
Bunker's photo was selected with another image to share the 1944 Pulitzer Prize for Photography. Many of the images which were submitted that year had a World War II theme. The prize jurists were Robert E. McAlarney and Fred J. Pannwitt and they selected two war-related photographs to win the 1944 Pulitzer. Frank Filan's image entitled Tarawa Island and Bunker's Homecoming were very different wartime images.

== Description ==
Lt. Col. Robert Moore was returning from North Africa and he was met by his wife, Dorothy Dee Moore (née Dee), his 6-year-old daughter, Nancy, and his 2-year-old nephew named Michael Croxdale. None of the faces of the subjects are visible in the image. Bunker said the flash bulb on his camera had failed on his first attempt to take a photo. He tossed the bulb under the train and he had to reset his camera, which was a 9-pound (4.1 kg) Speed Graphic camera. He then had to rush the next shot and hope that the timing was right. He spun around and pressed the button just in time to capture the scene and his flash worked. The image was described as a father returning from a 16-month deployment as his young daughter falls into his arms. James Collings described it as "a scene of a soldier crushing his daughter in his arms at a railroad station".

== Reception ==
New York Daily News columnist Ed Sullivan said, "It is one of the all-time top pictures of the war". It won a national Associated Press news photo contest and was used on literature distributed by the American Red Cross. The image was featured in Life, Newsweek, and Time. Newsweek called it "a picture that ranks with the war classics." The image was entered in an Encyclopædia Britannica image contest and on May 1, 1944, it placed third.

Writing in the Omaha World-Herald in July 2022, Sheritha Jones said "The embrace represented the fondest wish of millions of Americans whose sons, husbands and fathers were away fighting the war."
