= 1955 Pulitzer Prize =

Awards for journalism and related fields

The following are the Pulitzer Prizes for 1955.

== Journalism awards ==
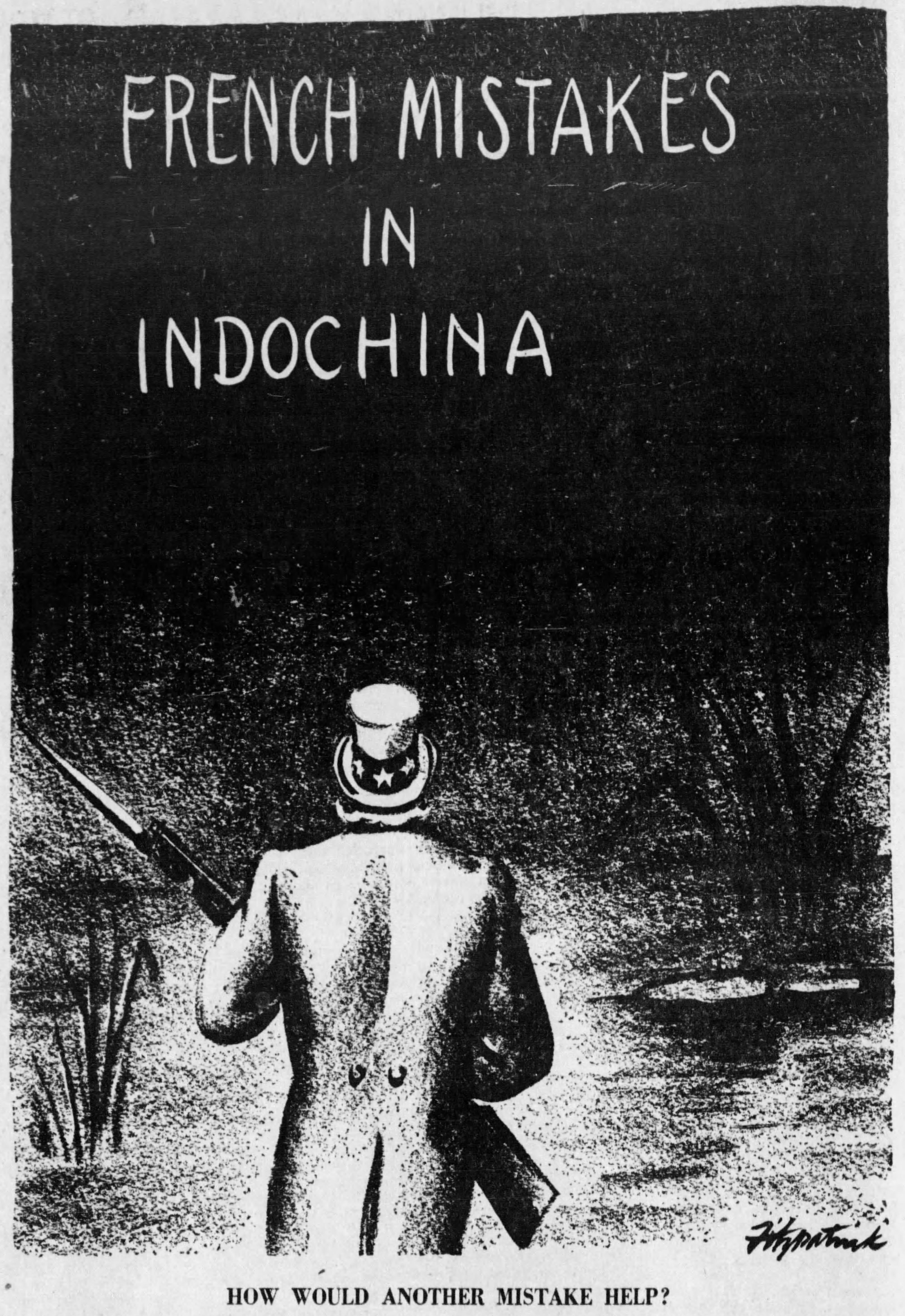
"How Would Another Mistake Help?", the prize-winning editorial cartoon

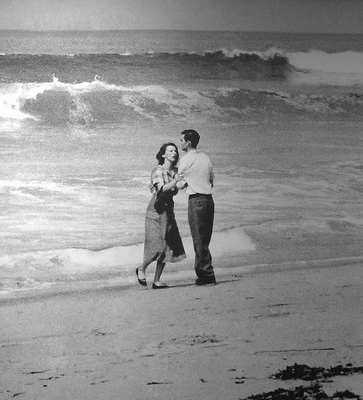
"Tragedy by the Sea", the prize-winning photograph

- Public Service:
  - The Columbus Ledger and Sunday Ledger-Enquirer, for its complete news coverage and fearless editorial attack on widespread corruption in neighboring Phenix City, Alabama, which were effective in destroying a corrupt and racket-ridden city government. The newspaper exhibited an early awareness of the evils of lax law enforcement before the situation in Phenix City erupted into murder. It covered the whole unfolding story of the final prosecution of the wrong-doers with skill, perception, force and courage.
- Local Reporting, Edition Time:
  - Caro Brown of the Alice Daily Echo, for a series of news stories dealing with the successful attack on one-man political rule in neighboring Duval County, Texas, written under unusual pressure both of edition time and difficult, even dangerous, circumstances. Mrs. Brown dug into the facts behind the dramatic daily events, as well, and obtained her stories in spite of the bitterest political opposition, showing professional skill and courage.
- Local Reporting, No Edition Time:
  - Roland Kenneth Towery of the Cuero Record, for his series of articles exclusively exposing a scandal in the administration of the Veterans' Land Program in Texas. This 32-year-old World War II veteran, a former prisoner of the Japanese, made these irregularities a statewide and subsequently a national issue, and stimulated state action to rectify conditions in the land program.
- National Reporting:
  - Anthony Lewis of the Washington Daily News, for publishing a series of articles which were adjudged directly responsible for clearing Abraham Chasanow, an employee of the U.S. Navy Department, and bringing about his restoration to duty with an acknowledgment by the Navy Department that it had committed a grave injustice in dismissing him as a security risk. Mr. Lewis received the full support of his newspaper in championing an American citizen, without adequate funds or resources for his defense, against an unjust act by a government department. This is in the best tradition of American journalism
- International Reporting:
  - Harrison E. Salisbury of The New York Times, for his distinguished series of articles, "Russia Re-Viewed", based on his six years as a Times correspondent in Russia. The perceptive and well-written Salisbury articles made a valuable contribution to American understanding of what is going on inside Russia. This was principally due to the writer's wide range of subject matter and depth of background plus a number of illuminating photographs which he took.
- Editorial Writing:
  - Royce Howes of the Detroit Free Press, for "An Instance of Costly Cause and Effect Which Detroiters Should Weigh Soberly", impartially and clearly analyzing the responsibility of both labor and management for a local union's unauthorized strike in July 1954, which rendered 45,000 Chrysler Corporation workers idle and unpaid. By pointing out how and why the parent United Automobile Workers Union ordered the local strike called off and stating that management let dissatisfaction get out of hand, the editorial made a notable contribution to public understanding of the whole program of the respective responsibilities and relationships of labor and management in this field.
- Editorial Cartooning:
  - Daniel R. Fitzpatrick of the St. Louis Post-Dispatch, for a cartoon published on June 8, 1954, entitled, "How Would Another Mistake Help?" showing Uncle Sam, bayoneted rifle in hand, pondering whether to wade into a black marsh bearing the legend "French Mistakes in Indochina". The award is also given for distinguished body of the work of Mr. Fitzpatrick in both 1954 and his entire career.
- Photography:
  - John L. Gaunt of the Los Angeles Times, for a photo that is poignant and profoundly moving, entitled, "Tragedy by the Sea", showing a young couple standing together beside an angry sea in which only a few minutes earlier their year-old son had perished.

== Letters, Drama and Music Awards ==
- Fiction:
  - A Fable by William Faulkner (Random)
- History:
  - Great River: The Rio Grande in North American History by Paul Horgan (Rinehart).
- Biography or Autobiography:
  - The Taft Story by William S. White (Harper).
- Poetry:
  - Collected Poems by Wallace Stevens (Knopf).
- Drama:
  - Cat on a Hot Tin Roof by Tennessee Williams (New Directions).
- Music:
  - The Saint of Bleecker Street by Gian-Carlo Menotti (G. Schirmer); an opera first performed at The Broadway Theatre, New York, December 27, 1954.
