= John L. Gaunt =

American photographer (1924–2007)

- Gaunt in 1955
- Born: John Lyndon Gaunt; June 4, 1924; Syracuse, New York, U.S.
- Died: October 26, 2007 (aged 83); Desert Hot Springs, California, U.S.
- Other name: Jack
- Education: University of Southern California
- Occupation: Photographer
- Employer: Los Angeles Times
- Known for: Winning the 1955 Pulitzer Prize for Photography
- Spouse: Mary Elise Gaunt
- Children: 2

John Lyndon Gaunt (June 4, 1924 – October 26, 2007) also known as Jack was an American photographer who worked for the Los Angeles Times. He won the 1955 Pulitzer Prize for Photography for his photograph titled "Tragedy by the Sea". The image showed a man and a woman standing on a beach after their 19-month-old son disappeared.

== Early life ==
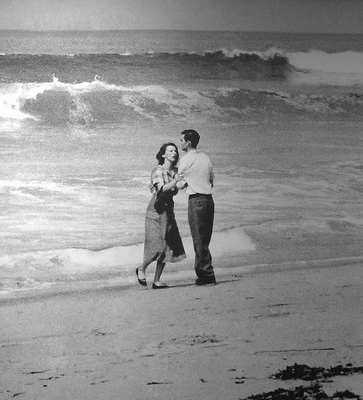
(1955) Gaunt's Pulitzer prize winning photograph Tragedy by the Sea, a young couple standing together beside the Pacific Ocean in Hermosa Beach, California

Gaunt was born on June 4, 1924 and was the only child. His father was a stockbroker and he moved the family to Southern California in the late 1920s. Gaunt grew up in Hermosa Beach, California. He grew up with his future wife, Mary Elise, and he graduated from Redondo Union High School. In high school he contributed to the school's newspaper and provided images to the Hermosa Beach newspaper, Daily Breeze. He served in the United States Army Air Forces as a pilot during World War II. He studied at Compton College and graduated from University of Southern California with a degree in zoology.

== Career ==
Gaunt was a Los Angeles Times photographer and his nickname was Jack. He worked at the Times as a second shift photographer: he worked from late afternoon until early morning each day. After his death, his daughter said that he enjoyed the challenges of covering fires.

On April 2, 1954 he captured an image which won him the 1955 award-winning photo entitled "Tragedy by the Sea". The image showed a man and a woman standing on a beach. The man and woman were a Hermosa Beach, California couple named John and Lillian McDonald. In the image they stood together beside the ocean that had just taken their 19-month-old son Michael away. The photo was on the front page of the Los Angeles Times the following morning. As well as the Pulitzer, the photograph won an Associated Press Managing Editor's Award, and a prize from the California-Nevada Associated Press. The Pulitzer prize earned Gaunt a $1,000 (equivalent to $12,019 in 2025) monetary award.

== Personal life ==
Gaunt married Mary Elise in the late 1940s, and the two had two daughters: Jane and Abigail. He worked for the Los Angeles Times from October 1950 to 1988. After Gaunt retired in 1988 he moved to the Pacific coast of Oregon. He died of congestive heart failure October 26, 2007. He had been in hospice at Desert Hot Springs.
