= C. P. Trussell =

American journalist

Charles Prescott Trussell
- Born: Charles Prescott Trussell; 3 August 1892; Chicago, Illinois
- Died: 2 October 1968 (aged 76); Washington D.C., United States
- Other names: "Peck"
- Occupation: Journalist
- Years active: 1917–1965
- Known for: The New York Times front-page bylines during World War II; 1949 Pulitzer Prize in Journalism
- Spouse: Married 1923 to Beatrice Wilkins Tait (b.1897 - d.1984)
- Children: Charles Tait Trussell (b.1925 - d.2017); Galen Douglas Trussell (b.1929 - d.2023)

Charles Prescott Trussell (3 August 1892 – 2 October 1968) was an American journalist and Pulitzer Prize winner. His front-page bylines in The Baltimore Sun and The New York Times were familiar to generations of newspaper readers. He was awarded a Pulitzer Prize for journalism in 1949.

== Early life ==
Charles Prescott Trussell (pronounced Tru-SELL) was born August 3, 1892, in Chicago, the son of Homer M. Trussell and Margaret Shuck Trussell. Homer Trussell traced his forebears to 17th Century colonial New England; a great-great uncle had fought at the Battle of Bunker Hill as a New Hampshire militiaman. Homer learned printing as a teenager and went on to edit and publish newspapers in Ohio, Michigan and Illinois. Margaret Trussell was educated at Baltimore Female College, a forerunner of Goucher College. After her husband's early death from cancer, Margaret kept Homer's local weekly paper in Berwyn, Ill. going for a time, then moved to her native Maryland, where she eked out a living for herself and three children teaching piano and voice at their Salisbury home.

From infancy, Trussell was called by his middle name, Prescott. Garbled by his siblings, this became "Peck" and the nickname stuck throughout his professional and personal life. Before becoming a journalist, Peck Trussell tried his hand in the lumber business, in Baltimore's C&O Railroad office and, with a friend in Springfield, Ill., buying and selling automobile tires. Their entire stock, piled in a back lot, was stolen by thieves one night, ending this brief attempt at entrepreneurship.

During World War I, Peck volunteered for duty but was turned down. Though an acceptable height of 5 feet 10, his slight weight failed to make the minimum poundage. When finally drafted, he put weights in his hat, wore it to his next physical, and passed. He was assigned to officer candidate school in Camp Gordon, Georgia, and emerged a second lieutenant of infantry, but the war ended before he was assigned overseas.

== Career ==
Peck's father and uncle had both been journalists and his older brother, P. L. Trussell, had begun a newspaper job. Now back in Maryland, Peck followed suit by joining the Baltimore American and soon after, was offered a position at the Baltimore News. In 1917 he was hired by The Baltimore Sun for $21 a week, where he stayed for 24 years.

He spent time on the police beat, covering robberies, shootings, brawls and other public disturbances. He was then promoted to copy editor and in 1925 was named city editor of the Sun.

In 1932, he was transferred to the Sun's Washington Bureau and began his work as a Washington correspondent, which would dominate the rest of his career. With President Roosevelt's incoming New Deal, the U.S. government ballooned in size, power and reach. Trussell covered the federal agencies and the White House --- at a time when FDR's press conferences were informal and reporters gathered around his desk. Congress would eventually become Peck Trussell's main beat.

At the outbreak of World War II in Europe in 1939, Trussell covered the U.S. Lend-Lease policy, which helped keep Britain going during her dark days, and the long congressional fight to establish a peacetime draft to buttress the U.S. Armed Forces.

In late 1941, Trussell accepted an offer to join the Washington bureau of The New York Times. When Pearl Harbor was attacked on December 7, 1941 Peck remembered seeing the gates of the Japanese Embassy swing shut as he was hurrying down to the Times Washington office. The next day he was present in the House Press Gallery as the President told a joint session of Congress that the attack marked "a date which will live in infamy." That morning's war extra had carried Peck's story announcing the President's address and that Congress was ready to vote for war and do whatever else the White House asked to defeat Japan.

Since Congress funded and maintained oversight of the armed services and nearly everything else needed to win the war, the Times congressional staff filed a large part of the paper's front-page copy. This included war news direct from the early battlefields. Trussell's stories included detailing the sinking of enemy ships in Japanese waters and U.S. setbacks in the Philippines, which soon fell to the enemy.

Also during the war, Trussell wrote articles for The New York Times Magazine, including "Congress Looks and Listens", and occasionally pinch-hit on radio for Fulton Lewis Jr., a prominent commentator for Mutual Broadcasting. He also contributed numerous articles to Nation's Business and other publications.

After the war, the American Defense Conference at Rio de Janeiro in 1947 offered Trussell a foreign assignment covering President Harry Truman and his family in Brazil. Postwar Washington assignments also included unification of the armed forces, the Marshall Plan to speed European recovery, statehood for Alaska and Hawaii, and a series of congressional investigations by the House Un-American Activities Committee and a Senate unit under Senator Joseph McCarthy into suspected communist influence in government. One of Trussell's front-page articles dealt with the dramatic face-off between former State Department official Alger Hiss and Whittaker Chambers, who accused Hiss of spying for the Soviet Union.

Trussell enjoyed the chance to bring personalities on Capitol Hill alive to readers. In a profile on Rep. Carl Vinson, who was in charge of defense matters in the House, Peck wrote, "Mr. Vinson is a Georgian with a large nose on which he rests spectacles half-way down and looks over them instead of through their lenses" while questioning generals and admirals. Elsewhere in the story, he quotes Vinson's response to the idea of becoming Secretary of Defense: "Shucks, I'd rather run the Pentagon from up here" at the Capitol.

Peck had strong opinions about the scope and limits of a journalist's role. Shortly after he joined The New York Times, an idea was floated at a staff meeting that news reporters in the bureau might submit editorials from time to time. Scotty Reston of the Times asked Peck what the practice was at his former paper. Trussell answered, "Absolute separation of church and state. Reporters give the news, not opinions."

Peck Trussell retired from journalism in 1965.

== Pulitzer Prize ==
The Pulitzer Prize is an award for achievements in newspaper and online journalism, literature, and musical composition in the United States. Peck Trussell was awarded the 1949 Pulitzer Prize in Journalism for "Distinguished Reporting on National Affairs" during a career spanning the installation of the New Deal, World War II and the Cold War. This accolade for day-to-day performance, rather than for a particular story or one-topic series, was a rare citation for the Pulitzer award.

== Personal life ==
In 1923 Peck married Beatrice Wilkins Tait, the daughter of veteran political leader Galen L. Tait, a tax lawyer and government official who guided Maryland's Republican Party as state chairman. The couple had two sons, Charles Tait and Galen Douglas, who in time also became journalists, the third set of Trussell brothers to do so.

In addition to receiving the Pulitzer Prize, Trussell was a life member of the Sigma Delta Chi journalistic fraternity, a governor of the National Press Club, and a member of the White House Correspondents Association. He was also a member of the Gridiron Club, a journalists group known for lampooning government figures at a white-tie dinner where the U.S. President makes a command performance.

In later years, Trussell walked with a cane and, being a lifelong smoker, suffered breathing difficulties. After Peck retired from the Times, Arthur Krock, former bureau chief and its elder statesman, wrote: "Peck's subjects have been human beings. But he has reported their activities with a monastic objectivity which resists the pressure of personal convictions as strong as those held by any man. Hence he has fulfilled the highest obligation of the responsibility imposed on the American press by its constitutional guarantee of freedom ... This was the heritage he left to his profession and to The New York Times."

== Death ==
C. P. Trussell died of pulmonary edema in Washington DC on October 2, 1968, at the age of 76.

== Sources ==
- Rothe, Anna, ed. (1950), Current Biography - Who's News and Why 1949, New York: H.W. Wilson, ISBN 9997376757
