= Nat Fein =

American photographer (1914–2000)

Nathaniel Fein
- Nat Fein, 2000
- Born: Nathaniel Fein; August 7, 1914; Manhattan, New York, U.S.
- Died: September 26, 2000 (aged 86); Westwood, New Jersey, U.S.
- Other name: Nat
- Occupation: Photographer
- Years active: 1933–1966
- Employer: New York Herald Tribune
- Known for: 1949 Pulitzer Prize for Photography
- Notable work: Babe Ruth Bows Out
- Spouse: Lois Fein
- Children: David Fein

Nathaniel Fein (August 7, 1914 – September 26, 2000) was a photographer for the New York Herald Tribune for 33 years. He was an only child and he grew up in Manhattan New York. During the Great Depression in the United States his father left and he was raised by his mother Frances.

Fein was known for taking human-interest photos, but he did take a photograph of Babe Ruth at the occasion of Ruth's number retirement ceremony in 1948. Fein received the 1949 Pulitzer Prize for the photograph which he titled, Babe Ruth Bows Out. Fein was married to his wife Lois and together they had one child named David.

== Early life ==
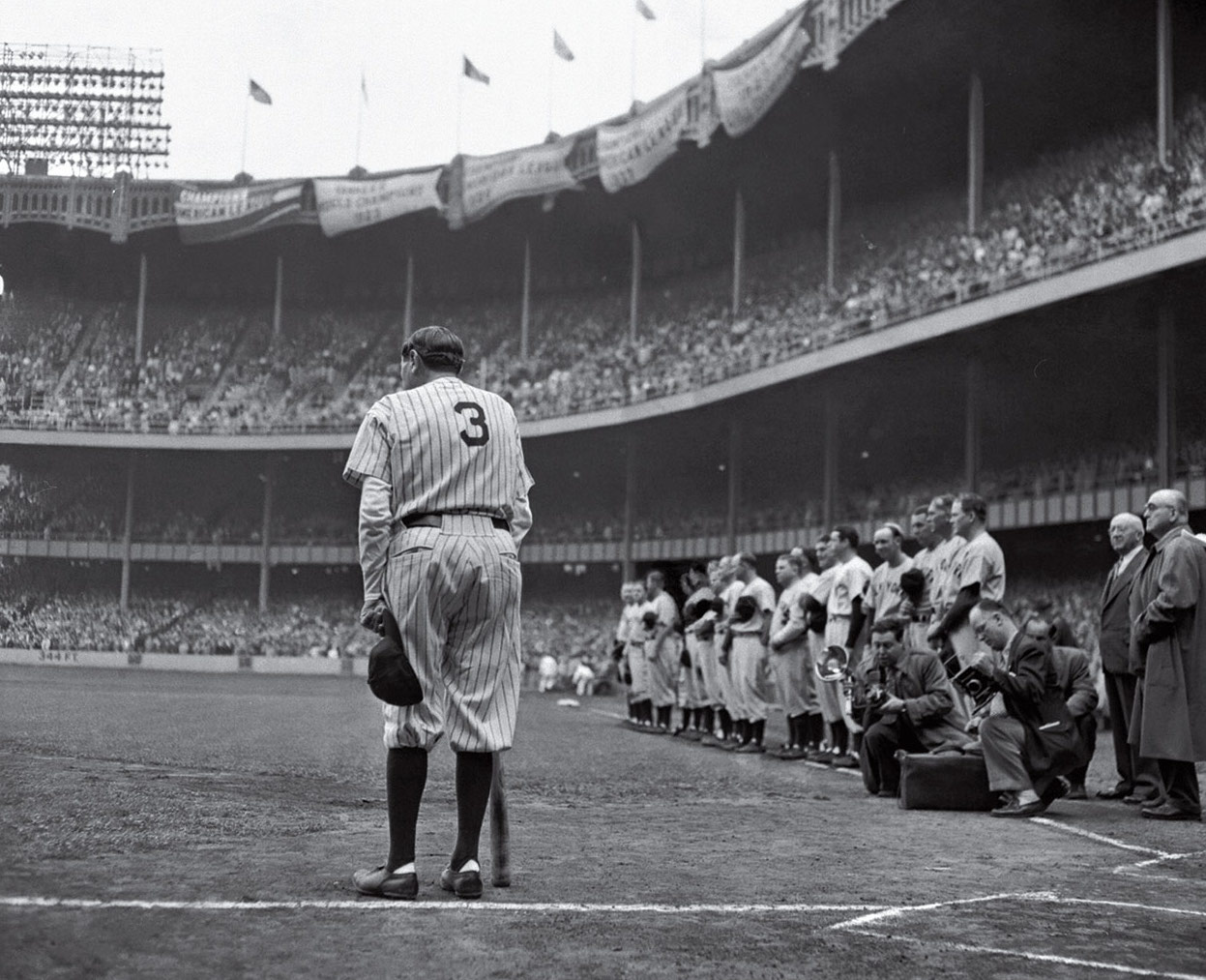
Babe Ruth Bows Out, 1948

Fein was born August 7, 1914 to Jewish-Russian immigrants and he was raised on the Lower East Side of Manhattan. His father Hyman Fein was a Vaudeville actor who left him and his mother Francis during the Great Depression in the United States. His mother worked in the garment district as a seamstress. He graduated from Erasmus Hall High School in 1932. In 1933 he began working as a copy boy for the New York Herald Tribune. During World War II Fein served as an Army Air Force photographer.

== Career ==
In 1936 Fein was hired as a full-time photographer. He was a staff photographer at the New York Herald Tribune and he worked for the newspaper until 1966 when the paper ended. On June 13, 1948, Fein took his most well-known photograph, Babe Ruth Bows Out, which was awarded the 1949 Pulitzer Prize for Photography. He referred to himself as a person who took human-interest photographs and he was not normally a sports photographer. On the day he captured the Pulitzer prize winning photograph Fein was filling in for a photographer who had called in sick.

He used a Speed Graphic camera to capture images. In his career he took over 50,000 photographs. He photographed Albert Einstein, John F. Kennedy and Queen Elizabeth.

== Personal life ==
After the New York Herald Tribune went out of business Fein went to work as a corporate photographer. From 1968 to 1980 he worked for Orange and Rockland Utilities. He lived in Tappan, New York with his wife Lois and his son David. Fein died on September 26, 2000, at the age of 86.

In 2008, author David Nieves wrote a book about Fein titled: The Fein Story Behind the Pictures: A Revealing Look at the Famous Images of Pulitzer Prize Photographer Nat Fein. Fein's life was the subject of a 2013 documentary titled, Nat Fein: A Talent for Living. Filmmakers Frank and Catherine LoBuono used the Fein images from Fein's career to create the documentary.
