= Earle Bunker =

American photographer

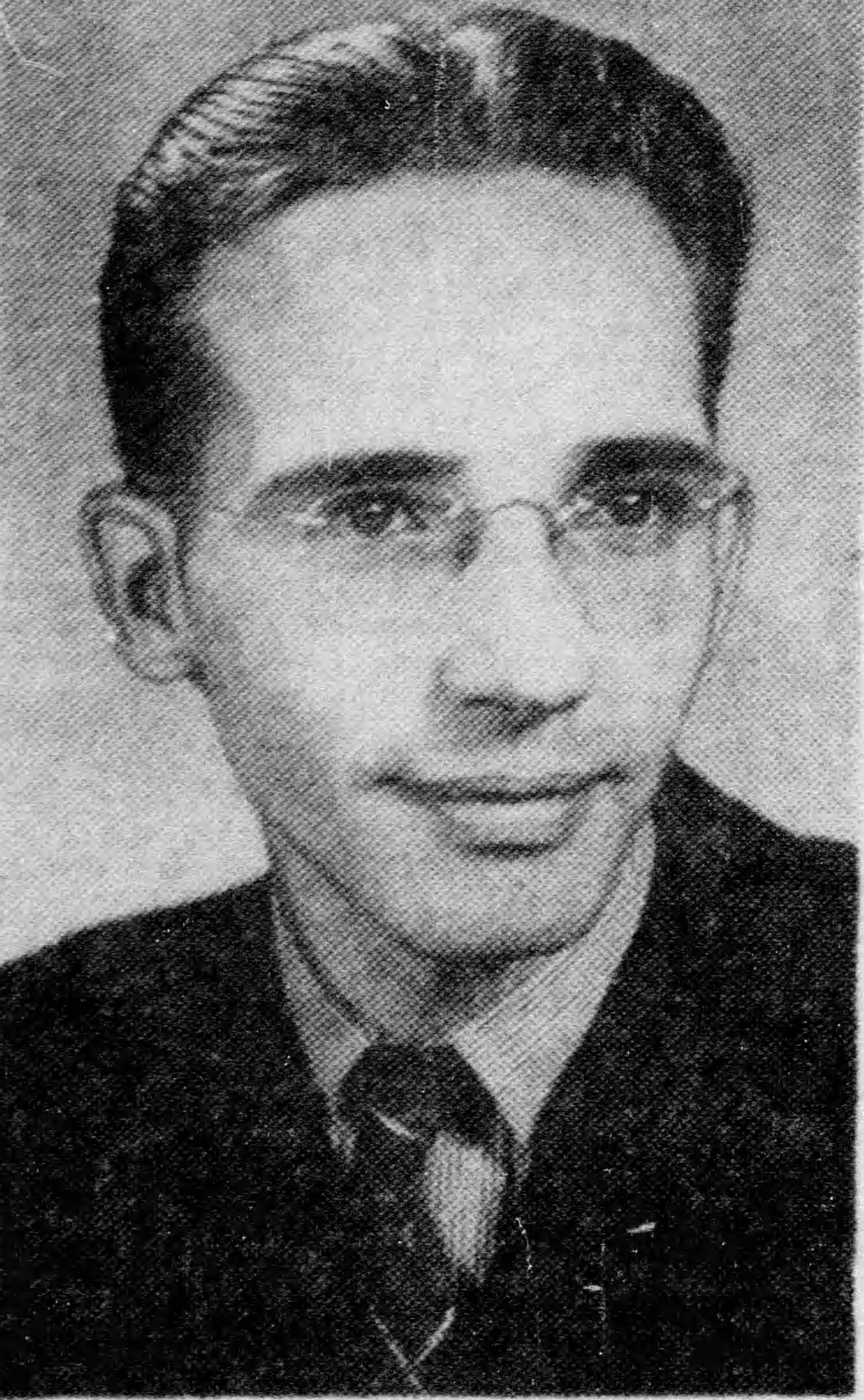
- Bunker in 1944
- Born: Earle Lawrence Bunker; September 4, 1912; Bridgewater, South Dakota US
- Died: January 29, 1975 (aged 62); Omaha, Nebraska US
- Other name: Buddy
- Occupation: Photographer
- Employer: Omaha World-Herald
- Known for: 1944 Pulitzer Prize for Photography
- Notable work: Homecoming
- Spouse: Helen Morrison
- Children: 1

Earle L. "Buddy" Bunker (September 4, 1912 – January 29, 1975) was an American photographer for the Omaha World-Herald and one of the two winners of the 1944 Pulitzer Prize for Photography. Bunker won the Pulitzer for his photograph which he titled Homecoming.

== Early life ==
He was born on September 4, 1912, and his mother was Doris. He was born in Bridgewater, South Dakota, but moved to Omaha, Nebraska. In 1929 when he was 17-years-old he started working for the Omaha Bee-News. He was described as "diminutive", his height was roughly 5 ft (1.5 m) and he weighed approximately 110 lb (50 kg).

== Career ==
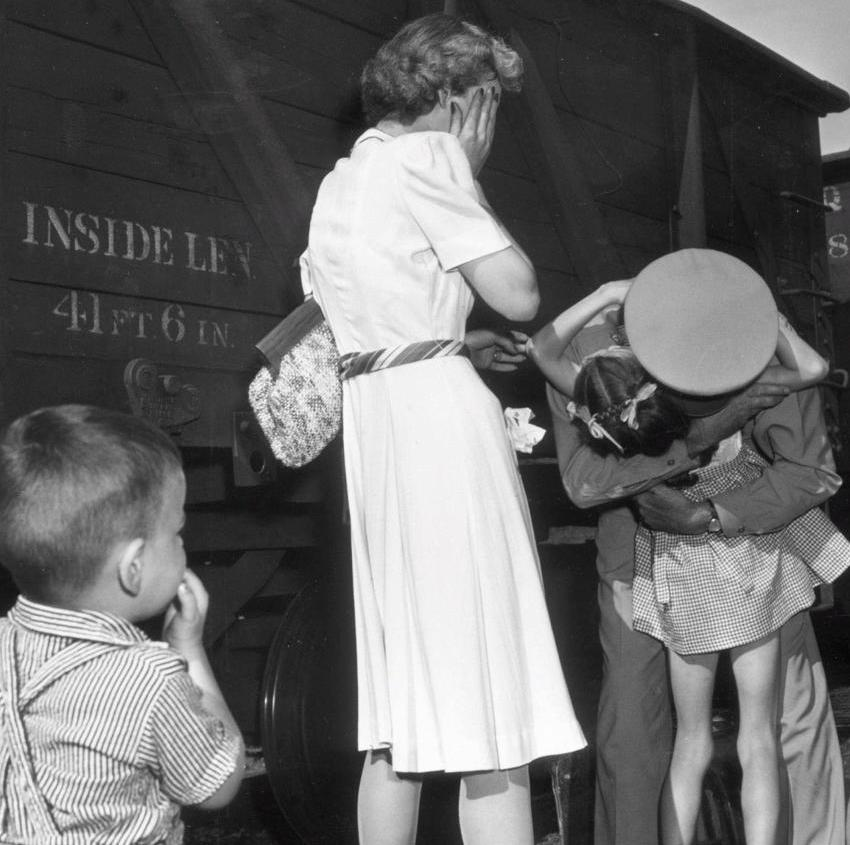
Bunker's (1944) Pulitzer Prize-winning photograph, "Homecoming"

In 1937, the Bee ceased publication when William Randolph Hearst sold it to the Omaha World-Herald. Bunker spent the rest of his career with the World-Herald. He was known to carry a 9-pound Speed Graphic camera with a large bulb attachment.

Bunker won the 1944 Pulitzer for his 1943 photograph entitled "Homecoming". The image captured a World War II soldier who has returned home by train, and the moment that he greets his family. The soldier in the image, Lieutenant Colonel Robert Moore, had been awarded the Distinguished Service Cross for leading his battalion against Erwin Rommel's Panzers in North Africa. He had been away from his family for sixteen months. Bunker waited over twenty-four hours for Moore's train to reach the station in Villisca, Iowa, so he could take the photograph.

When he was notified that his photograph had won the Pulitzer Prize he said, "Boy wait until I sit down. I'm very happy, very happy."

== Personal life ==
He was married to Helen née Morrison and together they had a daughter. While at home on January 29, 1975, he died of a heart attack.
