= Gae Bennett =

American agricultural economist (1917–2002)

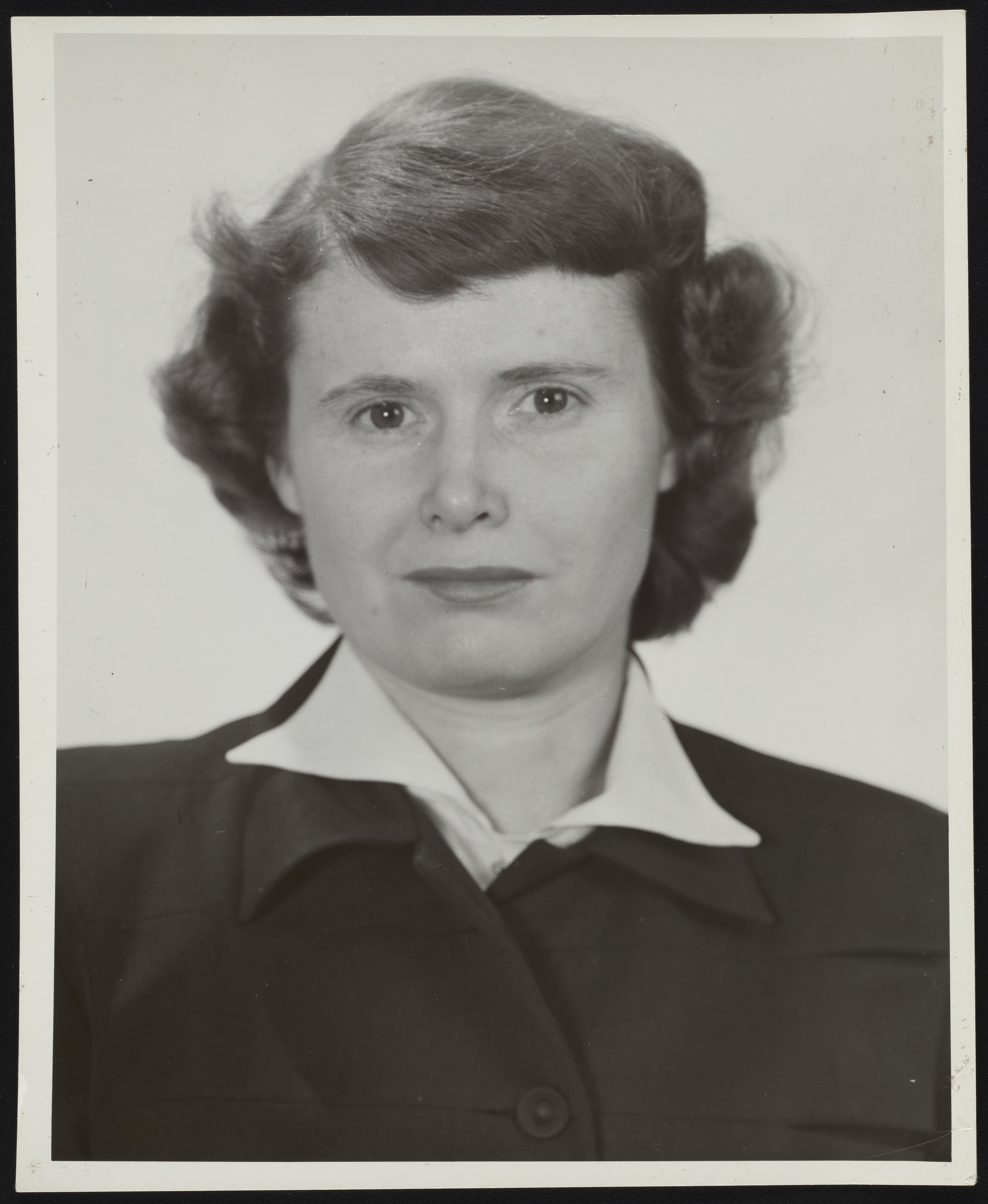
USDA Portrait of Bennett, circa 1950s

Gae Virginia Adamson Bennett (April 20, 1917 – March 30, 2002) was an American agricultural economist and author.

== Early life and marriage ==
Bennett was born on April 20, 1917, in Whitmer, West Virginia, the eldest of eight children. Her parents were Bruce Adamson and Opal Sites. She was married to Oran Bennett, a chemist in the Bureau of Animal Industry, and they had one son and one daughter.

== Career ==
Bennett started her federal service in the 1940s as a researcher with the Bureau of Plant Industry, Soils, and Agricultural Engineering (BPISAE). While working for the United States Department of Agriculture Economic Research Service as chief agricultural economist and statistical coordinator, Bennett authored and co-authored numerous published articles, volumes and books on agricultural production and trade around the world, with a focus on the Western Hemisphere. During her time in the department, Bennett was also a staff writer for Foreign Agriculture magazine. In her role with the agency, she helped to maintain the Foreign Agricultural Trade System of the United States.

In 1970, Bennett was appointed as an observer to the Inter-American Statistical Institute, representing the U.S. government. Bennett retired from government service in 1979 and moved to Northern Virginia. Her work continues to be sited by researchers in the fields of agricultural economics, pollution, food policy, and global trade.

== Death ==
Bennett died on March 30, 2002, at the age of 84 and is interred at Dayton Cemetery in Rockingham County, Virginia.

== Works ==
- Sulphur in Fertilizers, Soil Amendments, and Manures, 1949
- Fertilizer Expenditures in Relation to Farm Income in Various States, 1952
- Foreign Agriculture Economic Report, 1961
- Food Balances for 24 Countries of the Western Hemisphere, 1964
- The Agricultural Situation in the Western Hemisphere, 1965
- U.S. Agricultural Trade with the Western Hemisphere, 1965
- Agricultural Policies in the Western Hemisphere, 1967
- The Agricultural Situation in the Far East and Oceania, 1969
- Agricultural Production and Trade of Colombia, 1973
