= Donald M. Anderson =

American graphic designer (1915–1995)

Donald Meyers Anderson (1915-1995) was a graphic designer, calligrapher and educator.

== Early life and education ==
Donald Myers Anderson was born in Bridgewater, South Dakota on December 13, 1915, the sixth of eight children born to John Howard and Gertrude Phoebe Myers Anderson. On June 18, 1939 he married Marjorie Elizabeth Miller (d.1986).

Anderson received both undergraduate and graduate art degrees from the University of Iowa (1940 and 1941) where he studied painting with Grant Wood and Philip Guston.

== Career ==
During World War II, Anderson initially worked in Washington D.C. as an illustrator for the Ordnance Department of the Pentagon, and later as a designer for the Civil Aeronautics Bureau. Throughout his career he did design work for various magazines, the State of Wisconsin, the University of Wisconsin Press.

After receiving his graduate degree in 1941, Anderson taught briefly at Iowa and then at Duluth State College before moving to Washington, D.C. In the fall of 1947 he accepted a full-time position in the Department of Art at the University of Wisconsin-Madison where he taught design, lettering and watercolor. He retired in December 1982.

During the 1950s and 60s, Anderson exhibited his paintings widely in the Midwest.

Anderson wrote two textbooks, The Elements of Design (1961), The Art of Written Form (1969), reissued in 1992 as The Art of Written Forms: The Theory and Practice of Calligraphy. Additionally, he published an artist book with Meles Vulgaris Press, and edited and published manuals on Renaissance calligraphy in the form of facsimiles.

== Awards ==
Starting in 1948 and during the next fifteen years, Anderson's paintings were exhibited frequently in the Midwest; he received about forty regional and national awards. In 1948 he won two large awards: one for his entry in the Wisconsin Centennial Exhibition, judged by Ben Shahn, and another at the Northwest Territory Exhibition in Springfield, Illinois. Anderson frequently participated in the Wisconsin Painters and Sculptors and Wisconsin Salon exhibitions, and in 1951 won a Gimbels purchase award for a painting titled “City at Night.” It was featured at the Milwaukee Art Museum and later reproduced as a two-page spread in the January 14, 1952 issue of Life magazine.

In 1959, Anderson received two design awards: one for his jacket cover for a University of Wisconsin Press book, On Numerical Approximation, and one of his full-color illustrations for The Behavior of Man was featured in Illustration ’59. In 1974, his limited edition Meles Vulgaris books were displayed at the Grolier Club in New York and were included in the American Institute of Graphic Art's Fifty Best Books in 1976 and 1977. His books also received awards from the Society of Typographic Arts in 1971, from the Chicago Book Clinic in 1973 and the Type Directors Club of New York in 1973 and 1979.

Examples of Anderson's paintings and drawings are included in the following collections: the University of Iowa Museum of Art (Iowa City), as well as the Chazen Museum of Art, the Milwaukee Art Museum (Milwaukee) and the Museum of Wisconsin Art (West Bend, Wisconsin).

The Newberry Library in Chicago acquired many of his personal papers and manuscripts. The Donald M. Anderson collection is housed in the Roger and Julie Baskes Department of Special Collections at the Newberry.

== Death and legacy ==
Anderson died at age 79 on September 5, 1995.

His papers are included in the Archives of American Art.

== Resources ==
Signature: A quarterly publication of the Colleagues of Calligraphy, Minneapolis/St. Paul Minnesota, Volume X, number 1, September 1965

Life magazine, "Wisconsin Airscapes" January 14, 1952, p. 68

Descendants of William and Catherine Anderson, Donald M Anderson, 1981 (plus other family-related books) The Wisconsin Historical Society, Madison Wisconsin

University of Wisconsin-Madison Archives, Oral History Program, Interview with Donald Anderson, 1991

The Art of Written Forms: The Theory and Practice of Calligraphy, Internet Archive
