= 1943 Pulitzer Prize =

Awards for journalism and related fields

The following are the Pulitzer Prizes for 1943.

== Journalism awards ==
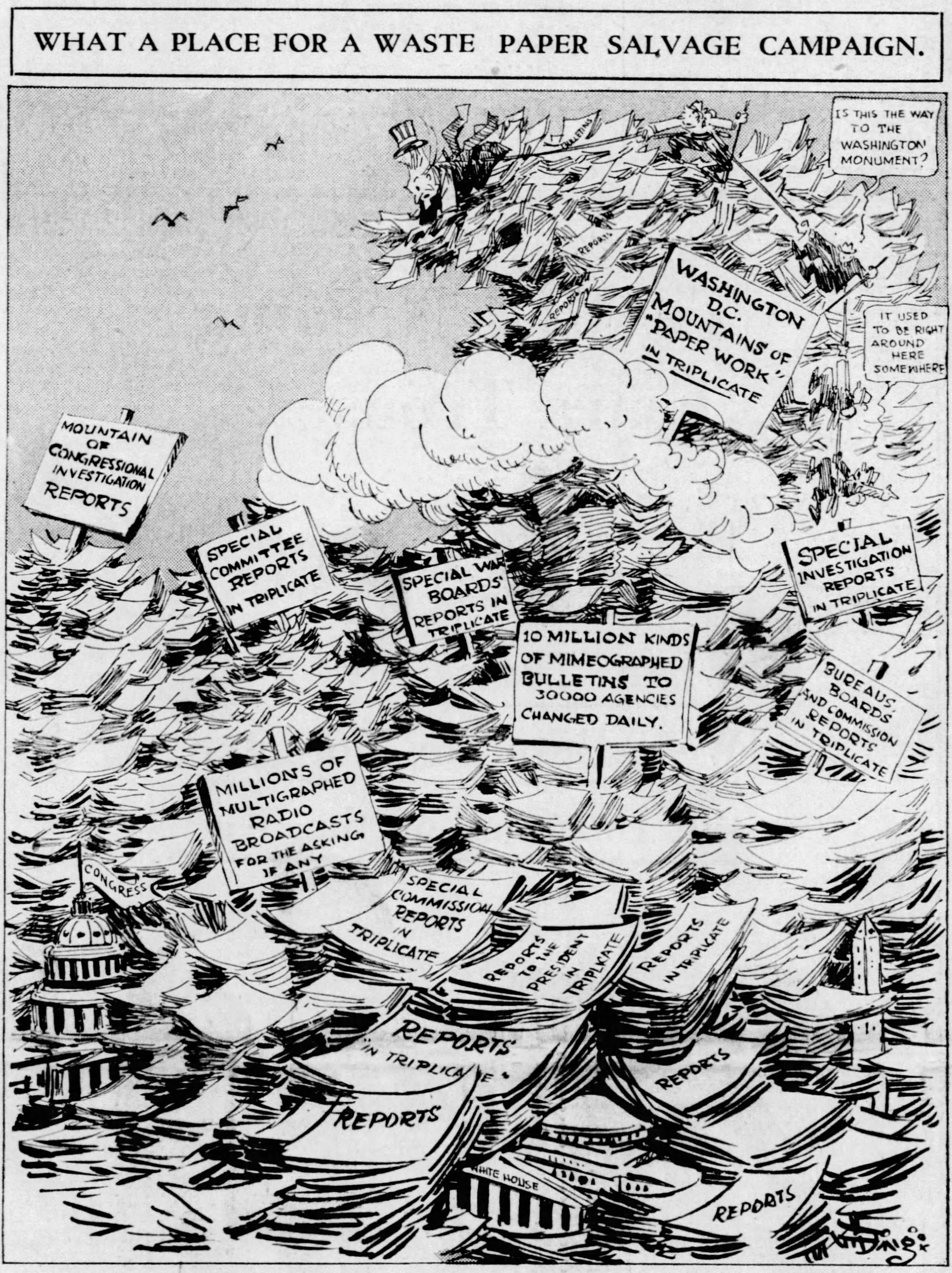
"What a Place For a Waste Paper Salvage Campaign", the prize-winning editorial cartoon

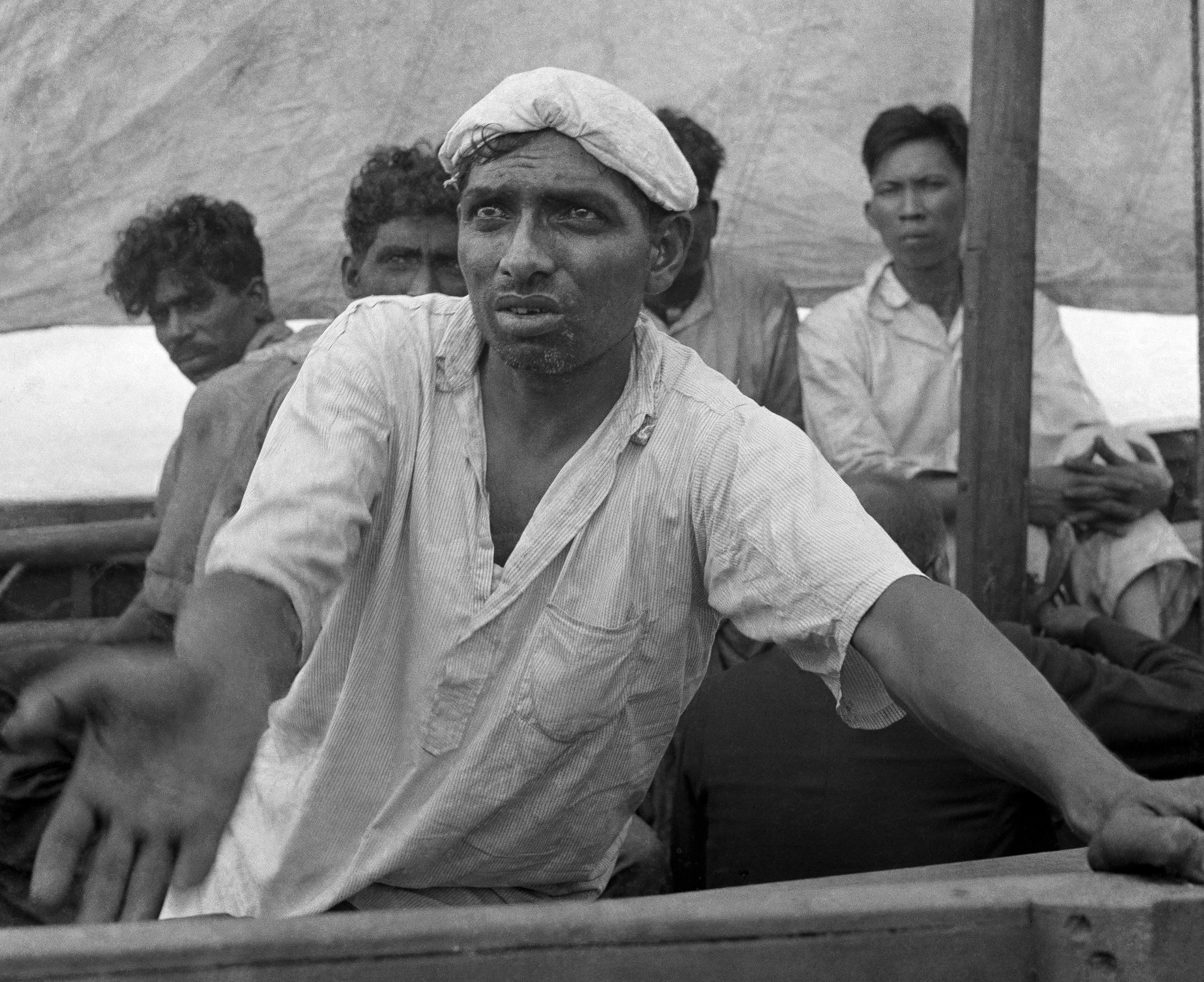
"Water!", the prize-winning photograph

- Public Service:
  - The Omaha World-Herald, "for its initiative and originality in planning a statewide campaign for the collection of scrap metal for the war effort. The Nebraska plan was adopted on a national scale by the daily newspapers, resulting in a united effort which succeeded in supplying war industries with necessary scrap material."
- Reporting:
  - George Weller of the Chicago Daily News for "Doc" Lipes Commandeers a Submarine Officers' Wardroom", "his graphic story of how a U.S. Navy Pharmacist's Mate under enemy waters in a submarine performed an operation for appendicitis saving a sailor's life".

- Correspondence:
  - Hanson W. Baldwin of The New York Times, "for his report of his wartime tour of the Southwest Pacific".
- Telegraphic Reporting (National):
  - No award
- Telegraphic Reporting (International):
  - Ira Wolfert of the North American Newspaper Alliance, "for his series of three articles on the fifth battle of the Solomons".
- Editorial Writing:
  - Forrest W. Seymour of the Register and Tribune (Des Moines, Iowa), "for his editorials published during the calendar year 1942".
- Editorial Cartooning:
  - Jay Norwood Darling of the Register and Tribune (Des Moines, Iowa), for "What a Place For a Waste Paper Salvage Campaign".
- Photography:
  - Frank Noel of the Associated Press, for his photo entitled, "Water!", portraying a desperate sailor on a lifeboat fleeing from the Japanese invasion of Singapore.

== Letters, Drama and Music Awards ==
- Novel:
  - Dragon's Teeth by Upton Sinclair (Viking)
- Drama:
  - The Skin of Our Teeth by Thornton Wilder (Harper)
- History:
  - Paul Revere and the World He Lived In by Esther Forbes (Houghton)
- Biography or Autobiography:
  - Admiral of the Ocean Sea by Samuel Eliot Morison (Little)
- Poetry:
  - A Witness Tree by Robert Frost (Holt)
- Music:
  - Secular Cantata No. 2: A Free Song by William Schuman. Performed by the Boston Symphony Orchestra and published by G. Schirmer, Inc., New York
