= Whitmer, West Virginia =

- Census-designated place
- Location within West Virginia Location within the United States
- Coordinates: 38°48′46″N 79°32′56″W
- Country: United States
- State: West Virginia
- County: Randolph
- Incorporated: 1903

Area
  - Total: 0.423 sq mi (1.10 km^{2})
  - Land: 0.423 sq mi (1.10 km^{2})
  - Water: 0 sq mi (0 km^{2})
- Elevation: 2,763 ft (842 m)

Population (2020)
  - Total: 94
  - Density: 220/sq mi (86/km^{2})
- Time zone: UTC-5 (Eastern (EST))
  - Summer (DST): UTC-4 (EDT)
- ZIP code: 26296
- Area codes: 304 & 681
- GNIS feature ID: 1553440

Whitmer is a census-designated place (CDP) in Randolph County, West Virginia, United States. It is 7.5 miles (12.1 km) south-southwest of Harman and is situated on the Dry Fork Cheat River. Whitmer had a post office, which closed on May 21, 2011. As of the 2020 census, its population was 94 (down from 106 at the 2010 census).

Whitmer was incorporated in 1903.

== Notable persons ==
- Gae Bennett, agricultural economist, was born in Whitmer.
- Dewey L. Fleming, journalist and Pulitzer Prize recipient, was born in Whitmer.
