= William Seaman =

American photographer

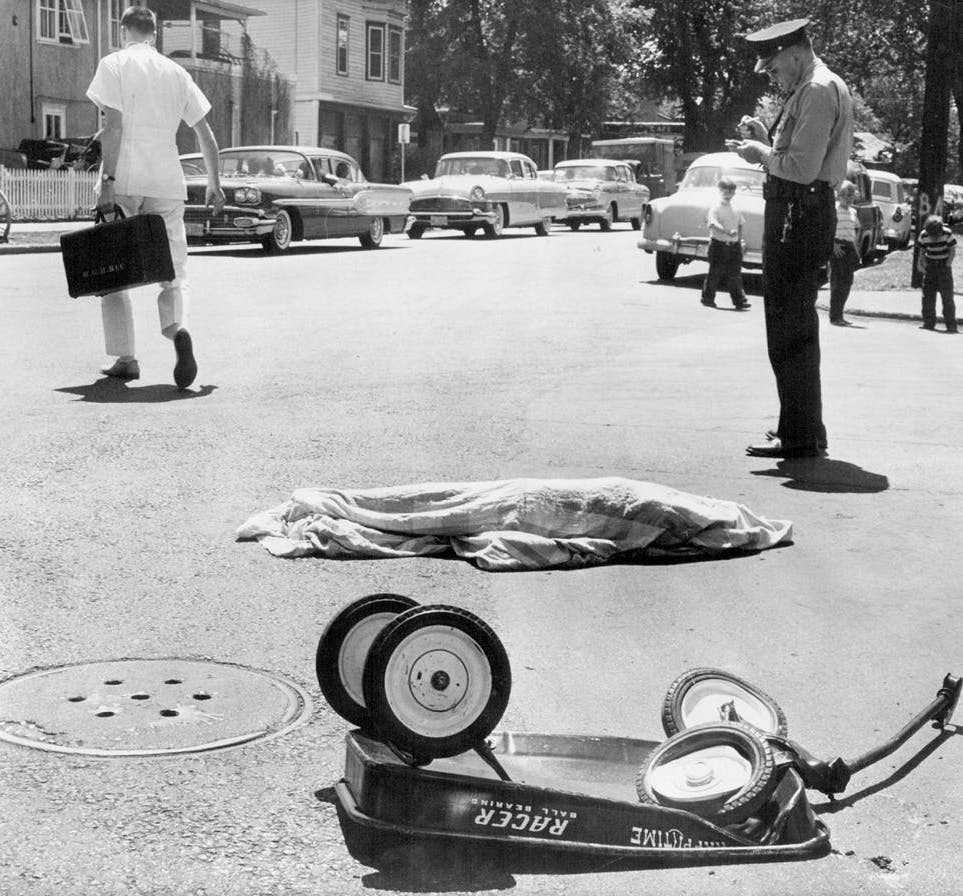
"Wheels of Death", Seaman's Pulitzer Prize-winning photograph

William Casper Seaman (January 19, 1925 – December 6, 1997) was an American photographer from Grand Island, Nebraska.

He won the 1959 Pulitzer Prize for Photography citing "Wheels of Death", a "dramatic photograph of the sudden death of a child in the street". He was photographer for the Minneapolis Star from 1945 to 1982.

In 1990, Pennsylvania new wave band Bang Chamber 8 used "Wheels of Death" for the cover art of their demo EP Just Another Demo.

He died in Minneapolis of natural causes.
