= Dewey L. Fleming =

American journalist

Dewey Lee Fleming
- Born: July 19, 1898; Whitmer, West Virginia
- Died: May 18, 1955 (aged 56); Baltimore, Maryland
- Education: Davis & Elkins College (B.A.)
- Occupation: Journalist
- Spouse: Elizabeth Walker (m. 1932–1938)
- Writing career
- Subjects: White House reporter, News reporting
- Notable awards: Pulitzer Prize for Telegraphic Reporting; 1944

Dewey Lee Fleming (July 19, 1898 – May 18, 1955) was an American journalist.

Fleming won the Pulitzer Prize for Telegraphic Reporting (National) in 1944. According to his obituary in The New York Times, Fleming "was considered one of the nation's keenest political analysts, noted particularly for his accuracy of interpretation".

== Early life and education ==
Fleming was born in Whitmer, West Virginia and grew up in Sutton, West Virginia, where he attended public schools. His parents, Hattie Powers Fleming and Sidney Albert Fleming, owned a general store in that town.

He studied at Davis & Elkins College in Elkins, West Virginia. In 1918, he received a B.A. degree from that institution. During his senior year in college, he served as a member of the Student Army Training Corps. He then spent a year (or, according to one source, a summer) at Columbia University.

== Career ==
Fleming spent his entire professional life as a journalist. He began working as a reporter for the Elkins Inter-Mountain newspaper, while he was still a college student. In 1922, after his year at Columbia University, he went to Baltimore, where he spent a year on the staff of The Baltimore American. In 1923 he took a job on the city staff of The Baltimore Sun. He worked in the Sun's Washington bureau in 1926–27, then ran its New York bureau in 1927–28, its Chicago bureau in 1928–29, and its London bureau for another two years.

He covered the 1926 trial in the 1922 Hall–Mills murder case in New Brunswick, New Jersey, and also reported on the Saint Valentine's Day Massacre in Chicago in 1929.

In 1931, he returned to the Sun's Washington bureau. He took part in the coverage of the 1936 and 1940 conventions of both major political parties. In November 1940, he was appointed chief of the Sun's Washington bureau. As head of the bureau, he specialized in reporting on the White House and State Department.

In August 1943, Fleming was one of nine newspaper reporters who were secretly invited to cover the first Quebec Conference between President Franklin D. Roosevelt and British Prime Minister Winston Churchill.

At his death, Fleming was chief of the Washington bureau of The Baltimore Sun newspaper. He died at the age of 56 in Johns Hopkins Hospital, in Baltimore, Maryland, after having spent several years in "frail health" and several months in hospital.

== Other professional activities ==
Fleming was a trustee of Davis & Elkins College.

== Memberships ==
Fleming was a member of the National Press Club, Gridiron Club, and Overseas Writers Club. He served as vice president of the Gridiron Club in 1954.

== Honors and awards ==
Fleming won the Pulitzer Prize for Telegraphic Reporting (National) in 1944. The citation praised his "consistently outstanding work" on national issues in 1943. He gave his $500 Pulitzer award to his alma mater, which in 1944 presented him with an honorary Doctorate of Laws.

== Personal life ==
In 1932, Fleming married Elizabeth Walker, a high school classmate. She died in 1938. They had no children.

== Legacy ==
His colleagues at The Baltimore Sun praised Fleming's "strength of character and the dedication to an ideal that made this small, quiet, modest, warmhearted man, as fine and as uncompromising a reporter as we have ever been privileged to know."
