= Caro Crawford Brown =

American journalist (1908–2001)

- Born: Caro Crawford; May 25, 1908; Baber, Angelina County, Texas, United States
- Died: August 5, 2001 (aged 93); Boerne, Texas, United States
- Resting place: Roselawn Memorial Park, Alice, Texas
- Occupation: Journalist
- Spouse: Jack Lennis Brown
- Children: Carolou Brown Mitchell; J. Sam Brown (1934–2008)

Caro Crawford Brown (May 25, 1908 – August 5, 2001) was a Pulitzer Prize-winning American journalist.

== Biography ==
Caro Crawford was born in Baber, Angelina County, Texas in 1908. Her family moved to Beaumont when she was 15, and she studied journalism at the College of Industrial Arts and Sciences (now Texas Woman's University). When her education was interrupted by the start of the Great Depression in 1929, she took a job in Conroe. There she met Jack L. Brown, whom she married. The couple moved to Duval County.

Caro Brown began working for the Alice Daily Echo in 1947, initially as a proofreader, and later as a columnist, society editor, and courthouse reporter. It was in this last role that she began investigating George B. Parr, a powerful political boss in Duval and Jim Wells Counties. Parr controlled a patronage system which dominated the political and economic landscape of the region. He had fallen under scrutiny for influencing the outcome of the 1948 Democratic Senate primary in favor of Lyndon Johnson, and for a series of local political campaigns which turned violent in 1952.

Brown spent long hours attending court proceedings, requesting public documents, and researching Parr's organization. Her articles were run by the Associated Press, drawing national attention to the issue. Members of the Texas Rangers law enforcement agency advised her that she was at risk of violence from Parr's supporters – a reporter named Bill Mason had previously been killed while conducting similar investigations – and Brown began carrying a handgun in her car for self-defense.

She became personally involved during an angry courthouse confrontation between Parr and Ranger Captain Alfred Allee. Sensing that Allee was about to physically attack Parr, Brown stepped in to separate them. For her story about the incident for the Daily Echo, Brown was awarded the Pulitzer Prize for Local Reporting, Edition Time. The committee's decision read:

For a series of news stories dealing with the successful attack on one-man political rule in neighboring Duval County, written under unusual pressure both of edition time and difficult, even dangerous, circumstances. Mrs. Brown dug into the facts behind the dramatic daily events, as well, and obtained her stories in spite of the bitterest political opposition, showing professional skill and courage.

Though George B. Parr was not convicted for corruption, the exposure of his political machine greatly limited his influence and eventually led to a fall from power.

Caro Crawford Brown retired from journalism shortly after winning the Pulitzer. She died in Boerne, Texas in 2001 at age 93.

== Honors ==
- Pulitzer Prize for Local Reporting, Edition Time, 1955
- Theta Sigma Phi honor society, 1955
- Texas Women's Hall of Fame, 1986
- Texas Newspaper Hall of Fame, 2016
