= Pulitzer Prize for Photography =

Former American journalism award

The Pulitzer Prize for Photography was one of the American Pulitzer Prizes annually awarded for journalism. It was inaugurated in 1942 and replaced by two photojournalism prizes in 1968: the Pulitzer Prize for Feature Photography and "Pulitzer Prize for Spot News Photography", which was later renamed Pulitzer Prize for Breaking News Photography in 2000.

The Pulitzer Prizes were established by the bequest of Joseph Pulitzer, which suggested four journalism awards, and were inaugurated beginning 1917. By 1942 there were eight Pulitzers for journalism; for several years now there have been 14 including the two for photojournalism.

== Winners ==
There were 26 Photography prizes awarded in 26 years, including two in 1944 (for 1943 work) and none in 1946.

Year	Image	Name(s)	Publication	Rationale
1942		Milton Brooks	The Detroit News	"for his photo entitled, 'Ford Strikers Riot.'"
1943		Frank Noel	Associated Press	"for his photo entitled, 'Water!' serviced by the AP."
1944		Earle Bunker	Omaha World-Herald	"for his photo entitled, 'Homecoming.'"
1944		Frank Filan	Associated Press	"for his photo entitled, 'Tarawa Island,' serviced by the AP."
1945		Joe Rosenthal	Associated Press	"for his photograph of the Marines planting the American flag on Mount Suribachi on Iwo Jima."
1946	No award			
1947		Arnold Hardy	Associated Press	"for his photo of a woman falling from a burning hotel, distributed by the AP."
1948		Frank Cushing	Boston Traveller	"for his photo, 'Boy Gunman and Hostage.'"
1949		Nat Fein	New York Herald Tribune	"for his photo, 'Babe Ruth Bows Out.'"
1950		Bill Crouch	Oakland Tribune	"for his picture, 'Near Collision at Air Show.'"
1951		Max Desfor	Associated Press	"for his photographic coverage of the Korean War, an outstanding example of which is, 'Flight of Refugees across Wrecked Bridge in Korea.'"
1952		John Robinson	The Des Moines Register	"for their sequence of 6 pictures of the Drake-Oklahoma A&M football game of October 20, 1951, in which player Johnny Bright's jaw was broken."
1952		Don Ultang	The Des Moines Register	"for their sequence of 6 pictures of the Drake-Oklahoma A&M football game of October 20, 1951, in which player Johnny Bright's jaw was broken."
1953		William M. Gallagher	The Flint Journal	"for a photo of ex-Governor Adlai E. Stevenson with a hole in his shoe taken during the 1952 presidential campaign."
1954		Virginia Schau	Akron Beacon Journal	"for snapping a thrilling rescue at Redding, California, the picture being published in the Akron Beacon Journal and other newspapers and nationally distributed by the AP."
1955		John L. Gaunt	Los Angeles Times	"for a photo that is poignant and profoundly moving, entitled, 'Tragedy by the Sea,' showing a young couple standing together beside an angry sea in which only a few minutes earlier their year-old son had perished."
1956		Staff	New York Daily News	"for its consistently excellent news picture coverage in 1955, an outstanding example of which is its photo, 'Bomber Crashes in Street.'"
1957		Harry A. Trask	Boston Traveller	"for his dramatic and outstanding photographic sequence of the sinking of the liner Andrea Doria, the pictures being taken from an airplane flying at a height of 75 feet only nine minutes before the ship plunged to the bottom. (The second picture in the sequence is cited as the key photograph.)"
1958		William C. Beall	The Washington Daily News	"for his photograph 'Faith and Confidence,' showing a policeman patiently reasoning with two-year-old boy trying to cross a street during a parade."
1959		William Seaman	The Minnesota Star Tribune	"for his dramatic photograph of the sudden death of a child in the street."
1960		Andrew Lopez	United Press International	"for his series of four photographs of a corporal, formerly of Dictator Batista's army, who was executed by a Castro firing squad, the principal picture showing the condemned man receiving last rites."
1961		Yasushi Nagao	Mainichi Shimbun	"for his photograph, 'Tokyo Stabbing,' distributed by United Press International and widely printed in American newspapers."
1962		Paul Vathis	Associated Press	"for the photograph, 'Serious Steps,' published April 22, 1961."
1963		Héctor Rondón	La República	"for his remarkable picture of a priest holding a wounded soldier in the 1962 Venezuelan insurrection: 'Aid from the Padre.' The photograph was distributed by the Associated Press."
1964		Robert H. Jackson	Dallas Times Herald	"for his photograph of the murder of Lee Oswald by Jack Ruby."
1965		Horst Faas	Associated Press	"for his combat photography of the war in South Vietnam during 1964."
1966		Kyōichi Sawada	United Press International	"for his combat photography of the war in Vietnam during 1965."
1967		Jack R. Thornell	Associated Press	"for his picture of the shooting of James Meredith in Mississippi by a roadside rifleman."

== See also ==
- List of photographs considered the most important
