= Frank Noel =

American photographer

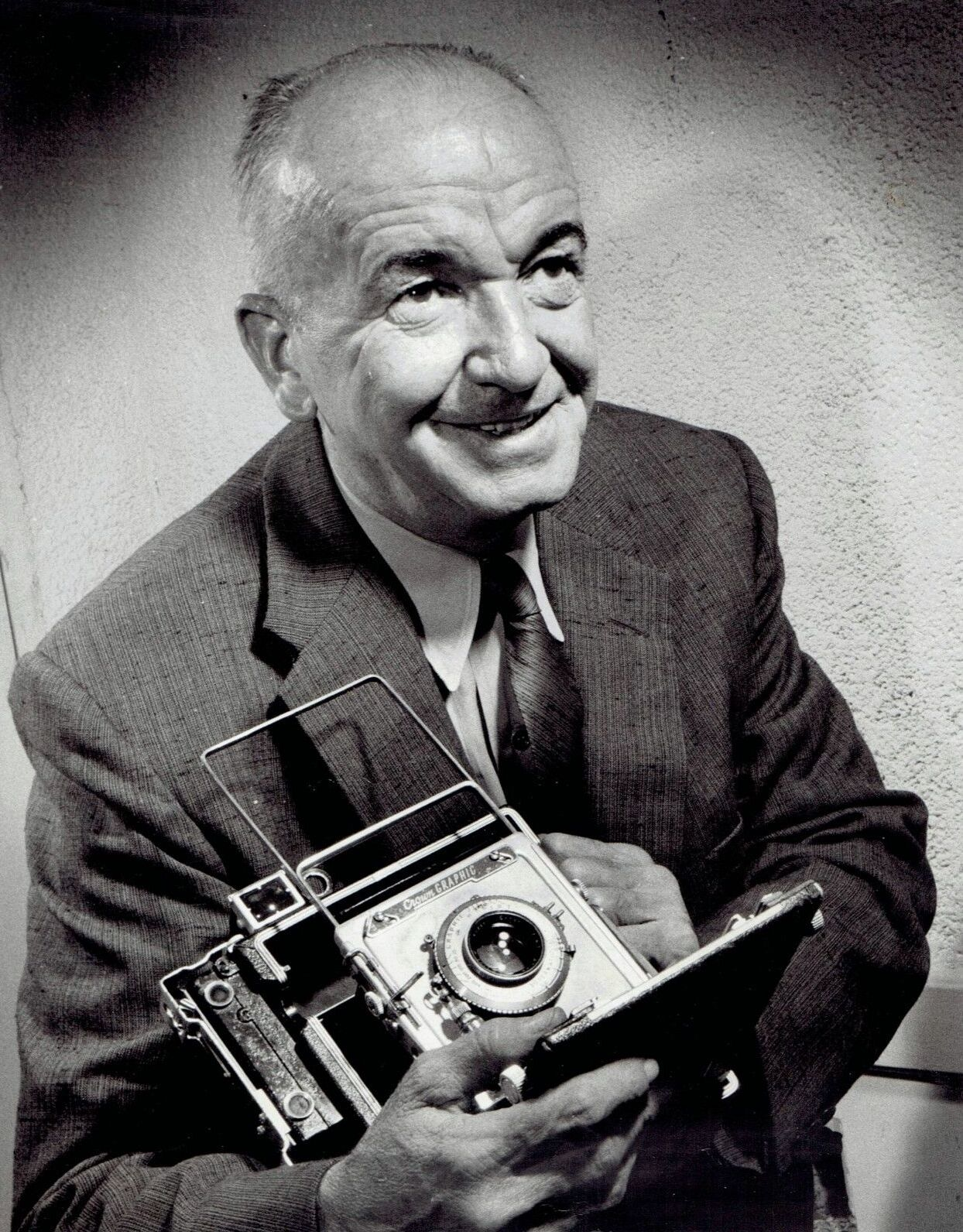
- Noel, c. 1958
- Born: Francis Evans Noel; February 12, 1905; Dalhart, Texas, United States
- Died: November 29, 1966 (aged 61); Gainesville, Florida, United States
- Other name: Frank E. "Pappy" Noel
- Occupation: Associated Press photographer
- Awards: 1943 Pulitzer Prize for Photography

Frank E. "Pappy" Noel (February 12, 1905 – November 29, 1966) was an Associated Press photographer and the winner of the 1943 Pulitzer Prize for Photography, the second winner of that prize.

Born in Dalhart, Texas, as Francis Evans Noel, he was known professionally as Frank “Pappy” Noel. Noel began his career in photography at the Chicago Daily News in 1925. He served in the United States Army Air Corps as an Aerial Photography Instructor and worked as a photographer for the Washington Post, Wichita Eagle, Kansas City Star, and the Oklahoma City News. Noel joined the Associated Press (AP) in 1937 and would spend the rest of his career with that agency.

During World War II, Noel worked for the AP in the Pacific Theater. To escape the Japanese invasion of Singapore, a malaria-stricken Noel paid for passage on a British freighter bound for Rangoon, but the freighter was sunk by a Japanese torpedo. Noel was adrift in the Indian Ocean for three days when his lifeboat encountered another one. An Indian sailor in the other lifeboat asked them for water, but they had none as Noel's lifeboat was out of water as well. Noel took a picture of the sailor and it was published after his lifeboat was rescued two days later. The photograph, titled "Water!", won Noel the Pulitzer Prize. Later in the war, Noel covered the Malayan Campaign, Burma, and India for the AP.

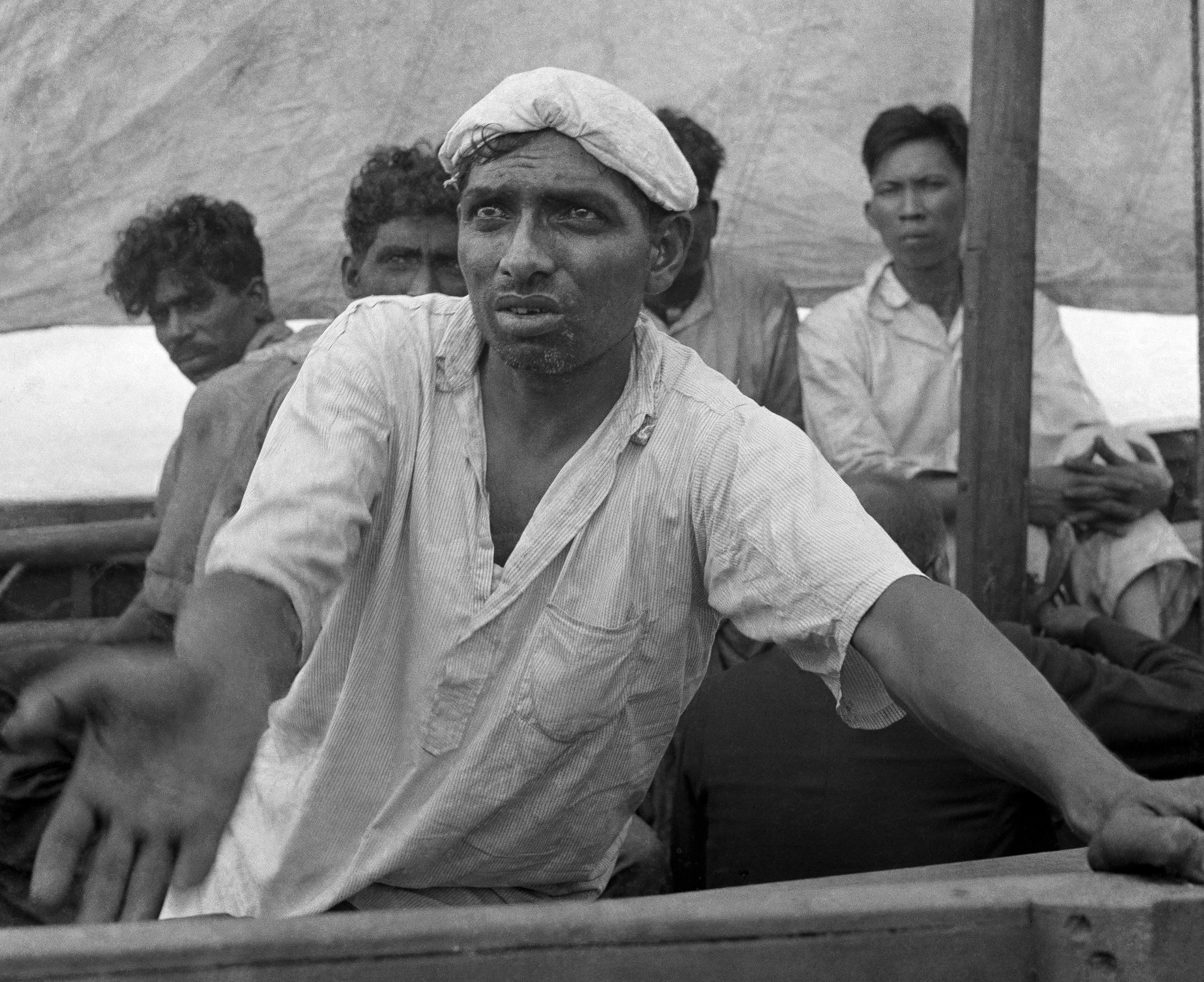
"Water!", Noel's Pulitzer Prize-winning photograph

After the war, Noel was assigned to cover the Mediterranean. The 1948 King David Hotel bombing destroyed his photography equipment and personal effects, but he was not in the hotel at the time.

Noel volunteered to cover the Korean War and accompanied the 7th Regiment of the 1st Marine Division. On his way to Chosin Reservoir, he was trapped with a Marine unit under the command of Major John N. McLaughlin, but they fought their way free. Two months later, on November 29, 1950, after a convoy was trapped near the reservoir, he went for help in a jeep but was intercepted and captured by the enemy. He spent the next 32 months in communist prison camps. He unsuccessfully attempted to escape three times, once only failing because he would not leave behind an ill fellow prisoner. He was even able to take exclusive pictures for the AP from inside the camps. Noel was freed in 1953 as a result of Operation Big Switch.

Noel was assigned to Florida in 1958 and retired there in 1966. He died at age 61 at the J. Hillis Miller Health Science Center in Gainesville, Florida following brain surgery, where he had been hospitalized two months earlier due to a stroke.
