= Carleton Mabee =

American writer, 1944 Pulitzer Prize winner (1914-2014)

Carleton Mabee (December 24, 1914 – December 18, 2014) was an American writer who won the 1944 Pulitzer Prize for Biography or Autobiography for The American Leonardo: The Life of Samuel F B. Morse.

== Life ==
Mabee was born in Shanghai, graduated from Bates College and Columbia University, and was a professor at State University of New York at New Paltz, retiring in 1980. In 1945, Mabee married Norma Dicking.

Mabee lived in Gardiner, New York.

== Works ==
- The American Leonardo: A Life of Samuel F. B. Morse, 1943; Literary Licensing, LLC, 2013, ISBN 9781494113834
- The Seaway Story, The Macmillan Company, 1961.
- Black Education in New York State: From Colonial to Modern Times, Syracuse University Press, 1979, ISBN 9780815622093
- Sojourner Truth: Slave, Prophet, Legend. NYU Press. 1 January 1995. ISBN 978-0-8147-5525-9.
- Carleton Mabee (2003). Gardiner and Lake Minnewaska. Arcadia Publishing. ISBN 978-0-7385-1185-6.
- Black Freedom: The Nonviolent Abolitionists from 1830 Through the Civil War, The Macmillan Company, 1970, ISBN 9780025771703
- “Saving the Shawangunks: The Struggle to Protect one of Earth’s Great Places” Black Dome Press 2017
- "Bridging the Hudson": The Poughkeepsie Railroad Bridge and it's connecting Rail Lines. Purple Mountain Press, 2001
