= Tragedy by the Sea =

1955 Pulitzer Prize winning photograph

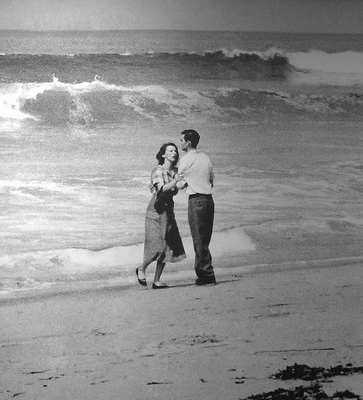
Tragedy by the Sea, a young couple standing together beside the Pacific Ocean in Hermosa Beach, California

Tragedy by the Sea, also known as Cruel Waves, is a photo showing a young couple, John and Lillian McDonald, standing together beside the Pacific Ocean in Hermosa Beach, California, United States. The image was captured in April 1954 by Los Angeles Times photographer John L. Gaunt. A few minutes before the image was taken, the couple's nineteen-month-old son Michael had disappeared. The photo won the 1955 Pulitzer Prize for Photography and an Associated Press Award.

== Background ==
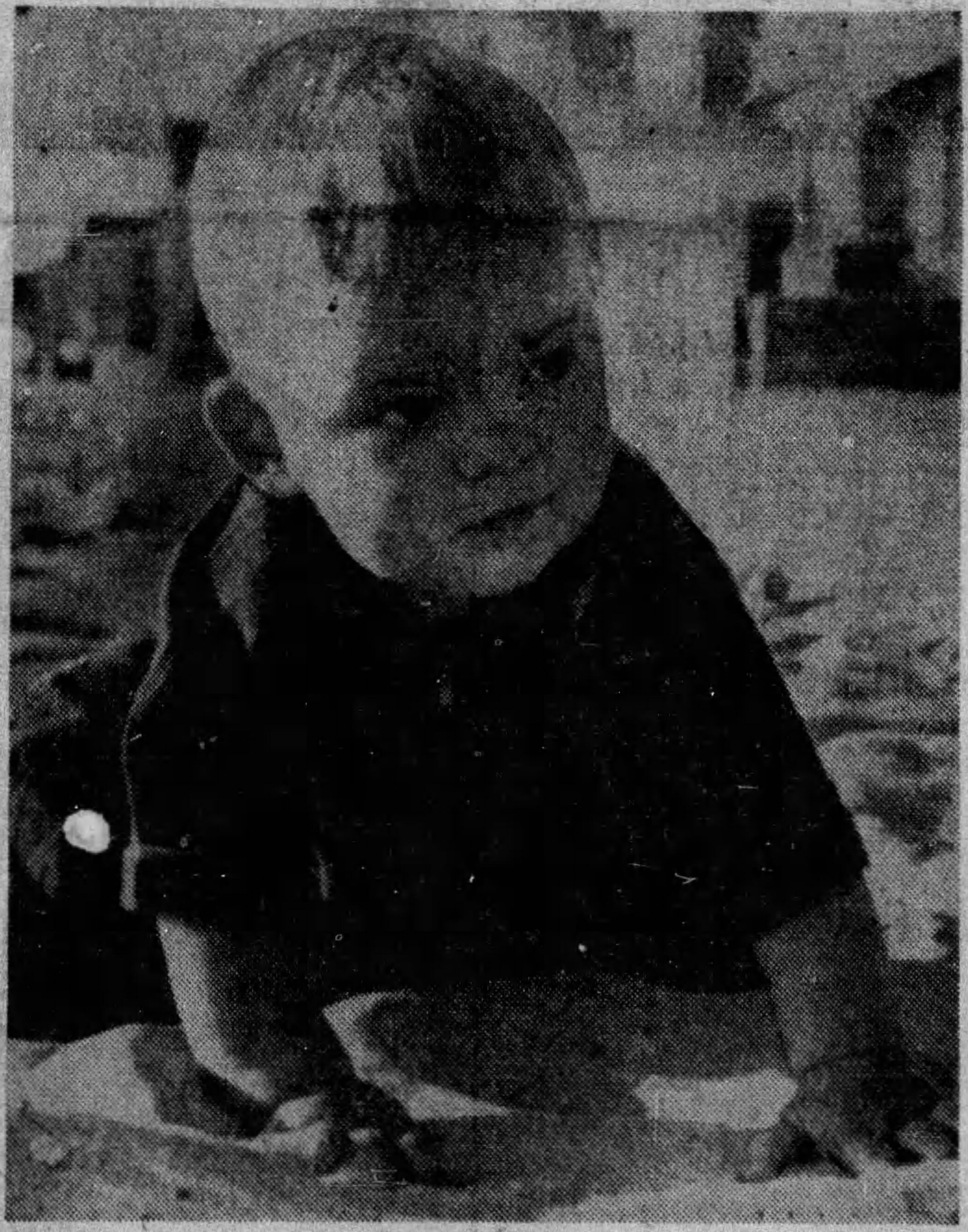
The photo of Michael sent to the Los Angeles Times

On April 2, 1954, a 19-month-old boy named Michael went missing along the shore in Hermosa Beach, California. His parents, John and Lillian McDonald, were photographed standing on the beach after the disappearance. According to Lillian, the boy had wandered out of the family's yard. She called the police, and authorities began searching for the boy. A woman named Beverly Murdock ran to a police station to report that she spotted a baby in the ocean, in a seaweed patch. She described the boy's clothing and it matched what Lillian had told police. John McDonald ran back and forth on the beach and Lillian restrained him from dashing into the ocean. The boy was not immediately found, and the search was suspended that night. John and Lillian refused to leave the beach even when it became too dark to search.

== Description ==
On the day of the boy's disappearance, Los Angeles Times photographer John L. Gaunt, Jr. was at his Hermosa Beach home when he heard a neighbor shout, "Something's happening on the beach!" Gaunt retrieved his camera, a Rolleiflex, and he ran to the beach. When he approached, he saw the young couple standing by the water's edge holding each other and he captured the image before the couple turned and walked away. Gaunt stated that his recollection is that he captured the image from 200 ft (61 m) away and had his camera set at 1/250 of a second with the aperture set at f/16.

The image, which Gaunt titled Tragedy by the Sea, was printed in the Los Angeles Times on April 3, 1954. At that time, the newspaper speculated that the boy might have been swept out to sea. The Pulitzer award earned Gaunt a $1,000 (equivalent to $12,019 in 2025) monetary award.

== Aftermath ==
The search went on for days and continued into April 5. The Los Angeles Mirror reported that John and Lillian kept a vigil on the beach for days. Michael's body was not found until April 12, which was ten days after his disappearance. The boy was spotted near 4th Street in Manhattan Beach. On April 12, 1954, a woman spotted the boy's body bobbing on the surf near her home. Her home was more than 1 mi (1.6 km) away from where the boy had gone missing; she pulled the body from the water and called the police.

== Reception ==
The image won the 1955 Pulitzer Prize for Photography. The Pulitzer jury called the photograph "poignant and profoundly moving". The image also won an Associated Press Award. The photo won first place in the 1954 Los Angeles Press Club's Honor Gallery of News Photos. It also won a special citation from the managing editors of the Associated Press. The Associated Press Best Spot News award occurred before the Pulitzer award and they referred to it with the title of Cruel Waves. In 2005 Sylvester Brown Jr. of the St. Louis Post-Dispatch called it "Gaunt's haunting 1954 photograph". When the photographer John Gaunt died in 2007, the Los Angeles Times began the obituary by identifying him as the man who won the Pulitzer Prize in 1955.
