= Roy Franklin Nichols =

American historian (1896–1973)

Roy Franklin Nichols (March 3, 1896 – January 12, 1973) was an American historian who won the 1949 Pulitzer Prize for History for The Disruption of American Democracy.

== Biography ==
Nichols was born in Newark, New Jersey, to Franklin Coriell and Annie Cairns Nichols. His wife was the historian Jeannette Paddock Nichols (1890–1982). He graduated from Rutgers University in 1918. He completed a Master of Arts degree from Rutgers in 1919. He was a fellow at Columbia University from 1920 to 1921, and an instructor in history at Columbia from 1921 to 1925. He completed a PhD degree from Columbia in 1923. In 1925 he was appointed assistant professor of history at the University of Pennsylvania. From 1930 to 1966, he was professor of history at Pennsylvania. He also was Dean of Graduate School of Arts and Sciences (1952–66), and Vice Provost at Pennsylvania (1953–66). He was a visiting professor at Columbia (1944–45), Pitt Professor of American History and Institutions at Cambridge University (1948–49), and Stanford University (1952). In 1962 he was Fulbright lecturer in India and Japan.

He was president of Middle States Association of History Teachers (1932–33); President of the Pennsylvania Historical Association (1936–1939); President of Pennsylvania Federation of Historical Societies (1940–42); Member of Pennsylvania Historical Commission (1940–43); Member of Council, American Historical Association (1943–47); Chairman of Social Science Research Council (1949–53); President of Association of Graduate Schools of the American Association of Universities (1963–64); Vice President of American Historical Association (1964–65); President of American Historical Association (1965–66); and, Chairman of Council of Graduate Schools in the United States.

In 1966 Nichols co-led a committee to defend academic freedom after steel and coal heiress Helen Frick launched a libel suit in state court against Professor Sylvester Stevens. According to University of New Mexico law professor and historian Joshua Kastenberg who wrote on the topic, Stevens had written a history of Pennsylvania, and she claimed his book defamed her father. A number of professional historians under the auspices of the American Historical Association and the Organization of American Historians collected historical data on the robber barons of that time as well as that the early histories that lionized Henry Frick were ahistorical and inaccurate idolizing of him. The Organization of American Historians named Ward as the head of the Joint Committee to Defend History. Helen Frick’s suit failed when Judge Clinton R. Widener, in 1967, determined that even if it were possible to defame a dead person, the historians had correctly captured Henry Frick’s largess, maltreatment of workers, and political corruption.

He was a Baptist.

== Awards and Honorary Degrees ==
Nichols was elected to the American Philosophical Society in 1945. He received Haney Medal for Literary Excellence in 1961, and Athenaeum Literary Award in 1961. He has also received a number of honorary degrees from universities such as Rutgers University and Cambridge University.

== Publications ==
- The Democratic Machine, 1850–1854 (1923)
- Franklin Pierce: Young Hickory of the Granite Hills (1931; 2nd ed. 1958)
- The Disruption of American Democracy (1948). (1949 Pulitzer Prize for History)
- Advance Agents of American Destiny (1956)
- Religion and American Democracy (1959)
- Blueprints for Leviathan: American Style (1963)
- History in a Self-Governing Culture (1966)
- The Invention of the American Political Parties (1967)
- The Pennsylvania Historical and Museum Commission: A History (1967) about the Pennsylvania Historical and Museum Commission
