= The Disruption of American Democracy =

History book by Roy Franklin Nichols

- Author: Roy Franklin Nichols
- Language: English
- Genre: History
- Publication date: 1948
- Publication place: United States

The Disruption of American Democracy is a 1948 nonfiction history book by American historian Roy Franklin Nichols. It won the 1949 Pulitzer Prize for History.

In the book, Nichols argued that the American Civil War was not fundamentally the product of underlying social and economic forces. He blames the machinations of "vote-hungry" politicians who calibrated their appeals in a culturally diverse society, which was speedily growing, so as to encourage regional and cultural groups to pursue objectives that led to the breakdown of the Union, something that most did not seek or foresee.
