= Bridgewater, South Dakota =

- City
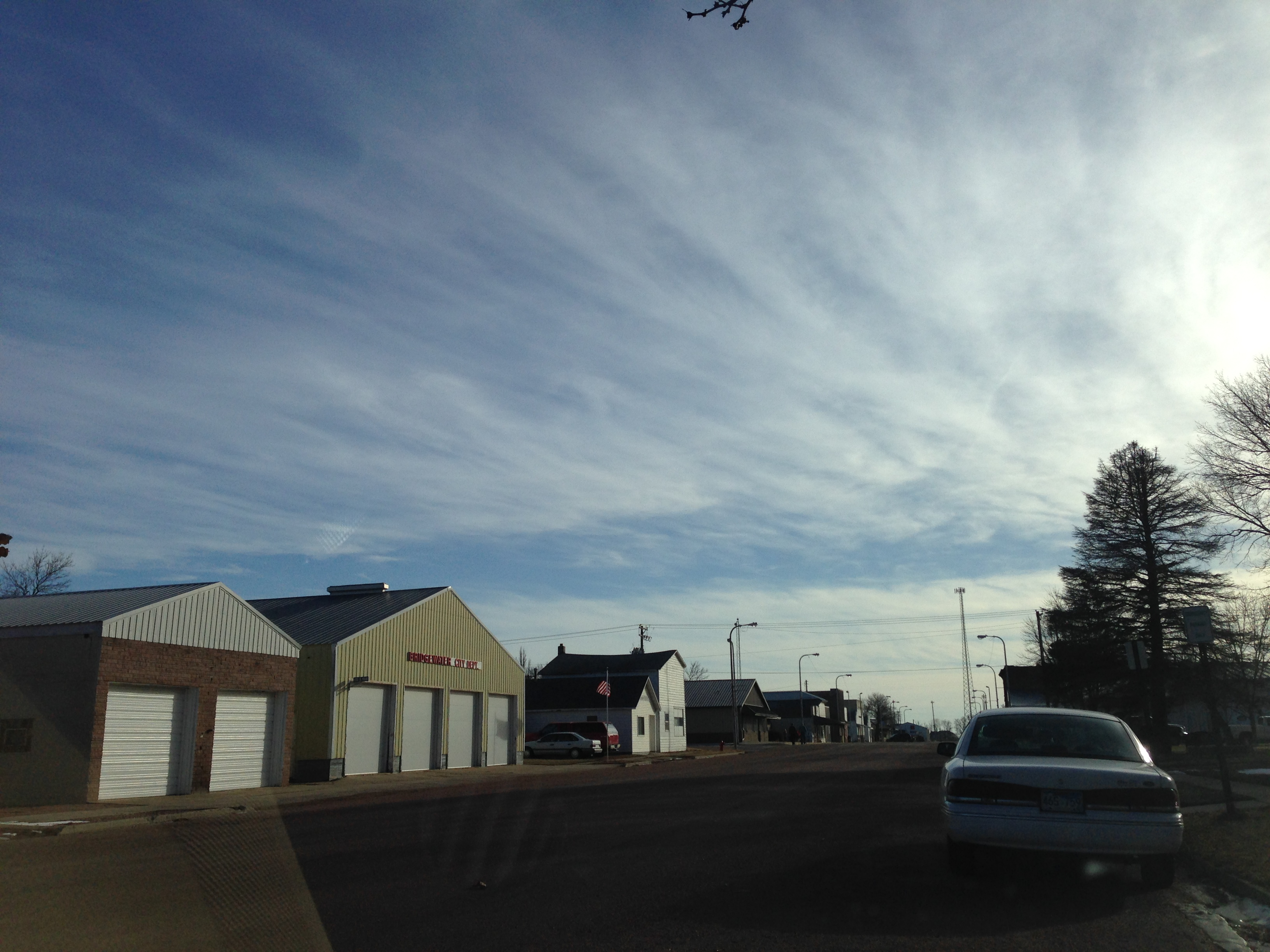
- Bridgewater Main Street, November 2014

- Location in McCook County and the state of South Dakota
- Coordinates: 43°33′01″N 97°29′54″W
- Country: United States
- State: South Dakota
- County: McCook
- Incorporated: 1889

Government
  - Mayor: Travis Holthaus (acting, as of 2026)

Area
  - Total: 1.12 sq mi (2.91 km^{2})
  - Land: 1.12 sq mi (2.91 km^{2})
  - Water: 0 sq mi (0.00 km^{2})
- Elevation: 1,421 ft (433 m)

Population (2020)
  - Total: 511
  - Density: 454.2/sq mi (175.35/km^{2})
- Time zone: UTC-6 (Central (CST))
  - Summer (DST): UTC-5 (CDT)
- ZIP code: 57319
- Area code: 605
- FIPS code: 46-07180
- GNIS feature ID: 1267295
- Website: bridgewatersd.com

Bridgewater is a city in southwestern McCook County, South Dakota, United States. The population was 511 at the 2020 census.

== History ==
Originally named Nation, the present name recalls an episode when water had to be carried to the town site for the railroad. A post office called Nation was established in 1880, and the name was changed that same year to Bridgewater.

== Geography ==
According to the United States Census Bureau, the city has a total area of 1.13 square miles (2.93 km^{2}), all land.

== Demographics ==
Historical population
Census	Pop.	Note	%±
1890	410		—
1900	691		68.5%
1910	934		35.2%
1920	976		4.5%
1930	762		−21.9%
1940	790		3.7%
1950	748		−5.3%
1960	694		−7.2%
1970	633		−8.8%
1980	653		3.2%
1990	533		−18.4%
2000	607		13.9%
2010	492		−18.9%
2020	511		3.9%
U.S. Decennial Census

=== 2020 census ===
As of the 2020 census, Bridgewater had a population of 511. The median age was 45.7 years. 24.5% of residents were under the age of 18 and 26.4% of residents were 65 years of age or older. For every 100 females there were 92.8 males, and for every 100 females age 18 and over there were 89.2 males age 18 and over.

0.0% of residents lived in urban areas, while 100.0% lived in rural areas.

There were 202 households in Bridgewater, of which 26.2% had children under the age of 18 living in them. Of all households, 47.0% were married-couple households, 20.8% were households with a male householder and no spouse or partner present, and 26.7% were households with a female householder and no spouse or partner present. About 33.2% of all households were made up of individuals and 19.8% had someone living alone who was 65 years of age or older.

There were 259 housing units, of which 22.0% were vacant. The homeowner vacancy rate was 4.2% and the rental vacancy rate was 34.4%.

Racial composition as of the 2020 census
Race	Number	Percent
White	449	87.9%
Black or African American	2	0.4%
American Indian and Alaska Native	12	2.3%
Asian	0	0.0%
Native Hawaiian and Other Pacific Islander	0	0.0%
Some other race	17	3.3%
Two or more races	31	6.1%
Hispanic or Latino (of any race)	46	9.0%

=== 2010 census ===
As of the 2010 census, there were 492 people, 204 households, and 133 families residing in the city. The population density was 435.4 inhabitants per square mile (168.1/km^{2}). There were 254 housing units at an average density of 224.8 per square mile (86.8/km^{2}). The racial makeup of the city was 98.4% White, 0.4% Native American, 0.6% Asian, 0.4% from other races, and 0.2% from two or more races. Hispanic or Latino of any race were 2.0% of the population.

There were 204 households, of which 28.9% had children under the age of 18 living with them, 48.5% were married couples living together, 11.8% had a female householder with no husband present, 4.9% had a male householder with no wife present, and 34.8% were non-families. 33.3% of all households were made up of individuals, and 21.1% had someone living alone who was 65 years of age or older. The average household size was 2.24 and the average family size was 2.77.

The median age in the city was 48.4 years. 23.8% of residents were under the age of 18; 2.6% were between the ages of 18 and 24; 19% were from 25 to 44; 25.6% were from 45 to 64; and 29.1% were 65 years of age or older. The gender makeup of the city was 45.3% male and 54.7% female.

=== 2000 census ===
As of the 2000 census, there were 607 people, 245 households, and 147 families residing in the city. The population density was 541.4 inhabitants per square mile (209.0/km^{2}). There were 266 housing units at an average density of 237.3 per square mile (91.6/km^{2}). The racial makeup of the city was 98.35% White, 0.33% Native American, 0.33% Asian, 0.33% from other races, and 0.66% from two or more races. Hispanic or Latino of any race were 1.81% of the population.

There were 245 households, out of which 27.3% had children under the age of 18 living with them, 50.6% were married couples living together, 6.5% had a female householder with no husband present, and 39.6% were non-families. 35.5% of all households were made up of individuals, and 25.3% had someone living alone who was 65 years of age or older. The average household size was 2.31 and the average family size was 3.07.

In the city, the population was spread out, with 25.4% under the age of 18, 4.9% from 18 to 24, 21.7% from 25 to 44, 19.6% from 45 to 64, and 28.3% who were 65 years of age or older. The median age was 43 years. For every 100 females, there were 87.9 males. For every 100 females age 18 and over, there were 82.7 males.

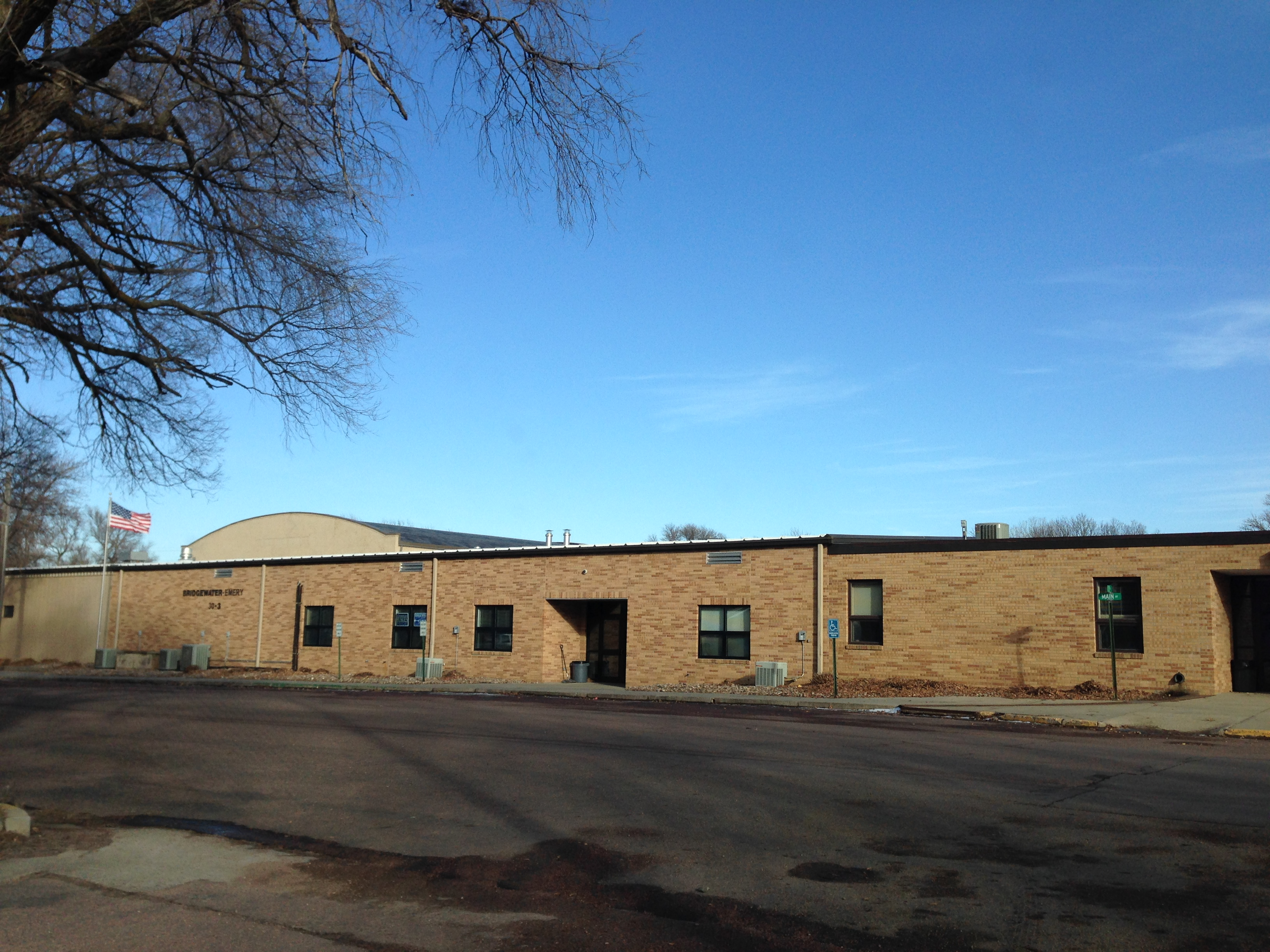
Bridgewater and Emery share an elementary school, which is located on Main Street in Bridgewater.

The median income for a household in the city was $31,765, and the median income for a family was $39,375. Males had a median income of $28,611 versus $21,458 for females. The per capita income for the city was $15,855. About 5.5% of families and 9.5% of the population were below the poverty line, including 13.0% of those under age 18 and 10.4% of those age 65 or over.

== Climate ==
Humid continental climate is a climatic region typified by large seasonal temperature differences, with warm to hot (and often humid) summers and cold (sometimes severely cold) winters. Precipitation is relatively well distributed year-round in many areas with this climate. The Köppen Climate Classification subtype for this climate is "Dfa" (Hot Summer Continental Climate).

Climate data for Bridgewater, South Dakota (1991−2020 normals, extremes 1948−present)
Month	Jan	Feb	Mar	Apr	May	Jun	Jul	Aug	Sep	Oct	Nov	Dec	Year
Record high °F (°C)	66 (19)	74 (23)	85 (29)	97 (36)	104 (40)	106 (41)	106 (41)	107 (42)	103 (39)	94 (34)	82 (28)	66 (19)	107 (42)
Mean maximum °F (°C)	48.4 (9.1)	53.7 (12.1)	69.9 (21.1)	81.6 (27.6)	89.0 (31.7)	94.2 (34.6)	95.9 (35.5)	94.6 (34.8)	90.7 (32.6)	82.5 (28.1)	67.2 (19.6)	49.9 (9.9)	98.1 (36.7)
Mean daily maximum °F (°C)	26.2 (−3.2)	31.5 (−0.3)	43.5 (6.4)	57.2 (14.0)	69.1 (20.6)	80.1 (26.7)	84.8 (29.3)	82.3 (27.9)	74.9 (23.8)	60.6 (15.9)	44.2 (6.8)	30.4 (−0.9)	57.1 (13.9)
Daily mean °F (°C)	16.9 (−8.4)	21.6 (−5.8)	33.0 (0.6)	45.9 (7.7)	58.2 (14.6)	69.4 (20.8)	73.8 (23.2)	71.3 (21.8)	62.8 (17.1)	48.8 (9.3)	33.9 (1.1)	21.6 (−5.8)	46.4 (8.0)
Mean daily minimum °F (°C)	7.7 (−13.5)	11.7 (−11.3)	22.6 (−5.2)	34.6 (1.4)	47.3 (8.5)	58.7 (14.8)	62.9 (17.2)	60.2 (15.7)	50.7 (10.4)	37.1 (2.8)	23.7 (−4.6)	12.7 (−10.7)	35.8 (2.1)
Mean minimum °F (°C)	−14.4 (−25.8)	−9.5 (−23.1)	−0.5 (−18.1)	19.0 (−7.2)	33.4 (0.8)	47.1 (8.4)	51.3 (10.7)	49.6 (9.8)	34.9 (1.6)	20.4 (−6.4)	5.7 (−14.6)	−9.0 (−22.8)	−18.6 (−28.1)
Record low °F (°C)	−35 (−37)	−33 (−36)	−23 (−31)	4 (−16)	19 (−7)	33 (1)	40 (4)	34 (1)	22 (−6)	8 (−13)	−21 (−29)	−29 (−34)	−35 (−37)
Average precipitation inches (mm)	0.59 (15)	0.70 (18)	1.25 (32)	2.99 (76)	3.97 (101)	4.23 (107)	3.41 (87)	3.73 (95)	3.03 (77)	2.27 (58)	0.94 (24)	0.79 (20)	27.90 (709)
Average snowfall inches (cm)	6.4 (16)	6.9 (18)	6.2 (16)	4.0 (10)	0.2 (0.51)	0.0 (0.0)	0.0 (0.0)	0.0 (0.0)	0.0 (0.0)	0.6 (1.5)	4.9 (12)	6.6 (17)	35.8 (91.01)
Average precipitation days (≥ 0.01 in)	2.2	3.1	3.5	6.6	8.9	7.7	5.6	6.4	5.5	4.6	2.5	2.4	59.0
Average snowy days (≥ 0.1 in)	3.2	3.3	2.3	1.2	0.0	0.0	0.0	0.0	0.0	0.3	1.5	3.1	14.9
Source: NOAA

== Notable people ==
- Donald M. Anderson, graphic designer and arts educator; born in Bridgewater
- Sparky Anderson, Hall of Fame baseball manager; born in Bridgewater. He is the namesake of Bridgewater's Sparky Anderson Park.

== See also ==
- List of cities in South Dakota
