= Babe Ruth Bows Out =

1949 Pulitzer Prize winning photograph

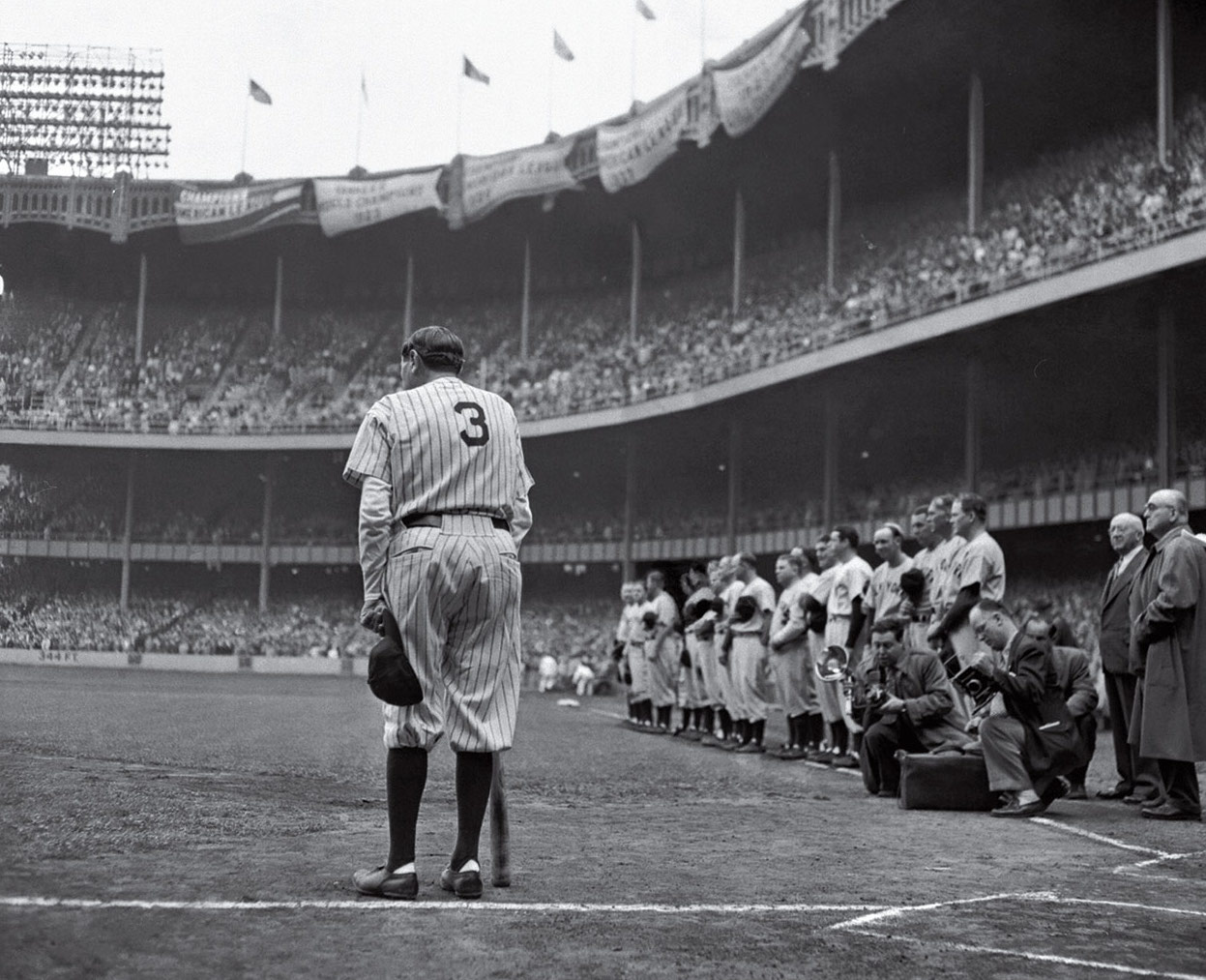
Babe Ruth Bows Out, June 13, 1948

Babe Ruth Bows Out, also known as The Babe Bows Out, is a 1948 photograph of Major League Baseball player Babe Ruth taken by New York Herald Tribune photographer Nathaniel Fein at Yankee Stadium in The Bronx. The picture won the 1949 Pulitzer Prize for Photography.

Ruth was photographed with his back turned to the camera; he was sick with throat cancer at the time and was leaning on a baseball bat for support. The New York Yankees were honoring Ruth by retiring his jersey number. It had been 14 years since he had played for the Yankees: he wore his number three Yankees uniform to celebrate the occasion.

== Background ==
Babe Ruth played for the New York Yankees from 1920 to 1934 and was regarded as one of the greatest baseball players. According to economist Michael Haupert, Ruth created public enthusiasm and he generated US$137,975.52 (equivalent to $3,320,679 in 2025) for the team in his first year as a Yankee. Baseball historian John Thorn said of Ruth's trade to the New York Yankees, "It marked the beginning of the age of the hero in baseball". Babe Ruth's impact on the Yankees is demonstrated by the fact that Yankee Stadium was often referred to as "the house that Ruth built".

Ruth initially was signed by the Boston Red Sox in 1914. He signed a three-year contract to continue playing for the Red Sox in March 1919, but after the season he was unhappy with his US$10,000 (equivalent to $185,701 in 2025) salary. When the 1919 baseball season ended he said he would refuse to play for the money he was being paid. Red Sox owner Harry Frazee needed money so on January 6, 1920, he sold Ruth to the Yankees for US$100,000 (equivalent to $1,857,006 in 2025). The trade of Ruth made the Yankees the focus of the league and he starred for them for the next fifteen years. By 1930 the Yankees were paying him an annual salary of US$80,000 (equivalent to $1,541,833 in 2025).

On June 13, 1948, Ruth attended a jersey retirement ceremony held for him by the New York Yankees at Yankee Stadium. Yankee Stadium hosted a total of 49,641 fans for the retirement ceremony. He had last played for the Yankees on September 30, 1934. (Note: Ruth's last appearance in a major-league baseball game was on May 30, 1935, for the Boston Braves.)

On the day of the event, one of the New York Herald Tribune's sports photographers who was assigned to attend the ceremony phoned in sick; Nathaniel Fein was told that morning that he would need to cover the event. Fein normally captured human-interest images and only occasionally photographed sporting events. When Ruth came out of the dugout, a band played the song "Auld Lang Syne". Many photographers from other news agencies were present and positioned along the first base line. (Note: Two other photographers, and their cameras, are visible in Fein's photograph.) Fein moved away from the other photographers and positioned himself behind Ruth to capture the back of his number three jersey, which the team was retiring. Even though the day was overcast, Fein took the photo without a flash. He opened the aperture on his camera to 5.6 and set the shutter speed at 1/25. Tribune sports editor Arthur Glass selected the image from the photos that Fein took that day. It was first published the day after the ceremony in the New York Herald Tribune.

== Description ==
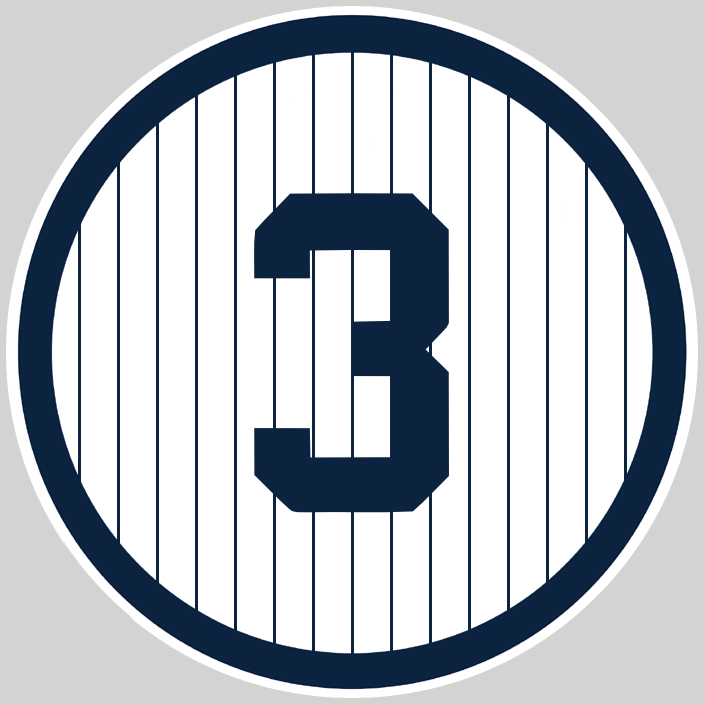
Babe Ruth's number 3 was retired by the New York Yankees in 1948.

Ruth did not appear to be healthy at the event; he emerged from the dugout using his baseball bat as a cane and he stood on the field near home plate. He waved his cap and then spoke into a microphone to say, "This makes me feel proud. It makes me feel good." The image captured by Fein showed Ruth from the back as he stepped forward. Time Magazine described his legs as "thin".

Writing for the National Baseball Hall of Fame and Museum, Scott Pitoniak said, "Fein embraces Ruth as a solitary figure, standing alone literally and figuratively. Also, quite literally, Ruth is the focus of the image — everything surrounding him recognizable and yet out of focus."

Fein said, "I saw Ruth standing there with his uniform number three, the number that would be retired, and knew that was the shot." The angle of the image captured Ruth's weakness by revealing the tilt of his back. Fein said of the image composition, "You didn't need to see the Babe's face to recognize him. You'd recognize his great hulk and spindly legs anyplace."

== Reception ==
The image won the 1949 Pulitzer Prize for Photography and was the first sports-related photo to win a Pulitzer Prize. An Associated Press photographer had captured an image which was almost the same as Fein's but their photograph was not submitted to the Pulitzer jury.

The photograph is displayed in Cooperstown, New York, at the National Baseball Hall of Fame and Museum. In 1985 the Columbia Record newspaper reported that the image was mounted beside Ruth's uniform in the Baseball Hall of Fame. It was also displayed at the Smithsonian Institution.

Fein sent a copy to Babe Ruth asking him to autograph it, but Ruth did not respond. Two months after the photograph was taken, Ruth died of throat cancer. After his death, Ruth's body lay in state at Yankee Stadium. In the two days that the Yankees hosted Babe Ruth's funeral it is estimated that 100,000 people attended to file past the open casket.

== See also ==
- List of photographs considered the most important
