= Frank Filan =

American photographer

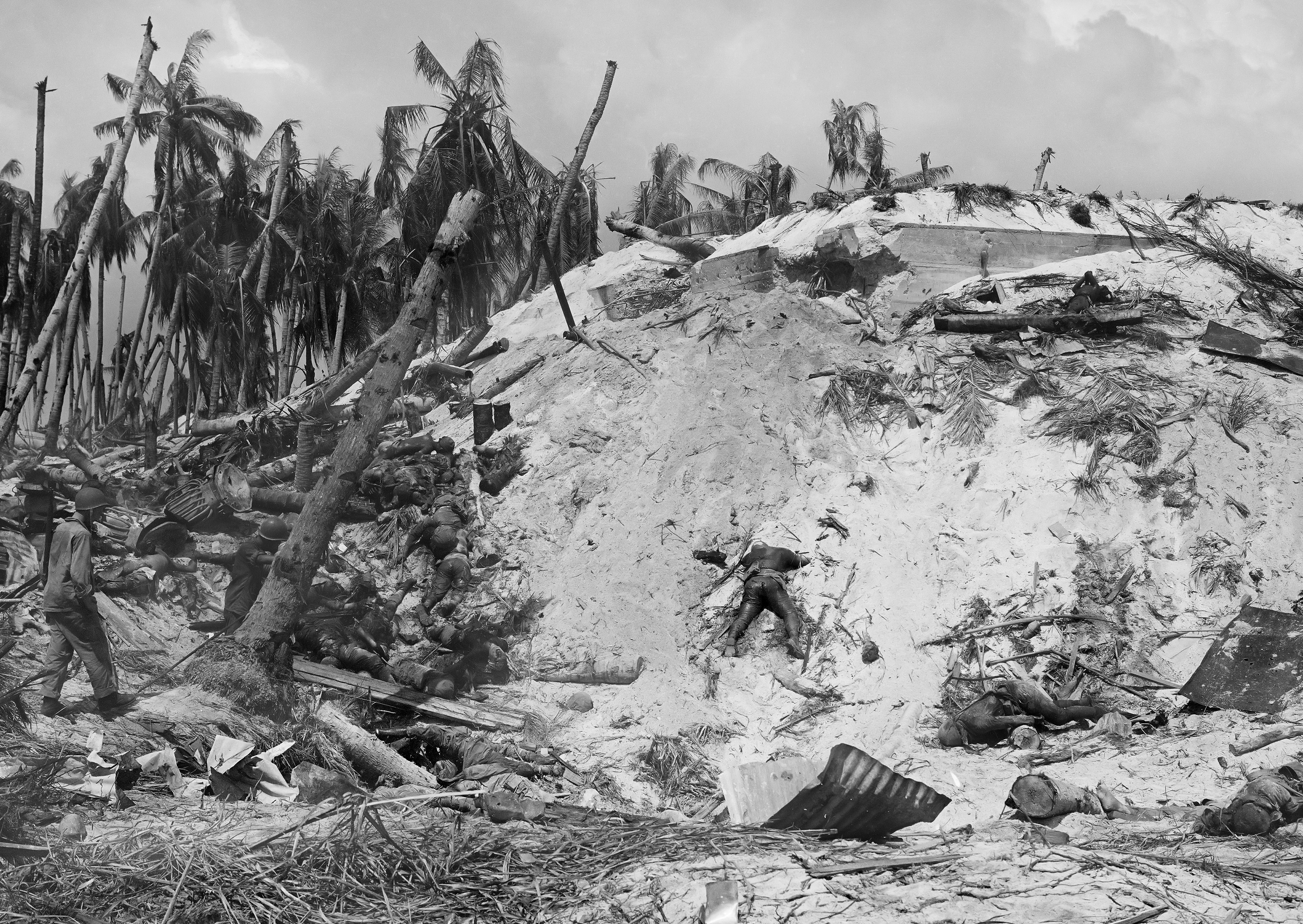
"Tarawa Island", Filan's Pulitzer Prize-winning photograph

Frank Xavier Filan (December 7, 1905-July 23, 1952) was an Associated Press photographer and one of the winners of the 1944 Pulitzer Prize for Photography. He entered U.S. military service in 1929, and covered the Pacific theater in WWII as a photographer.

Born in Brooklyn, New York, Filan began his career with the Los Angeles Times.
