= Otto D. Tolischus =

German-Lithuanian-American journalist (1890–1967)

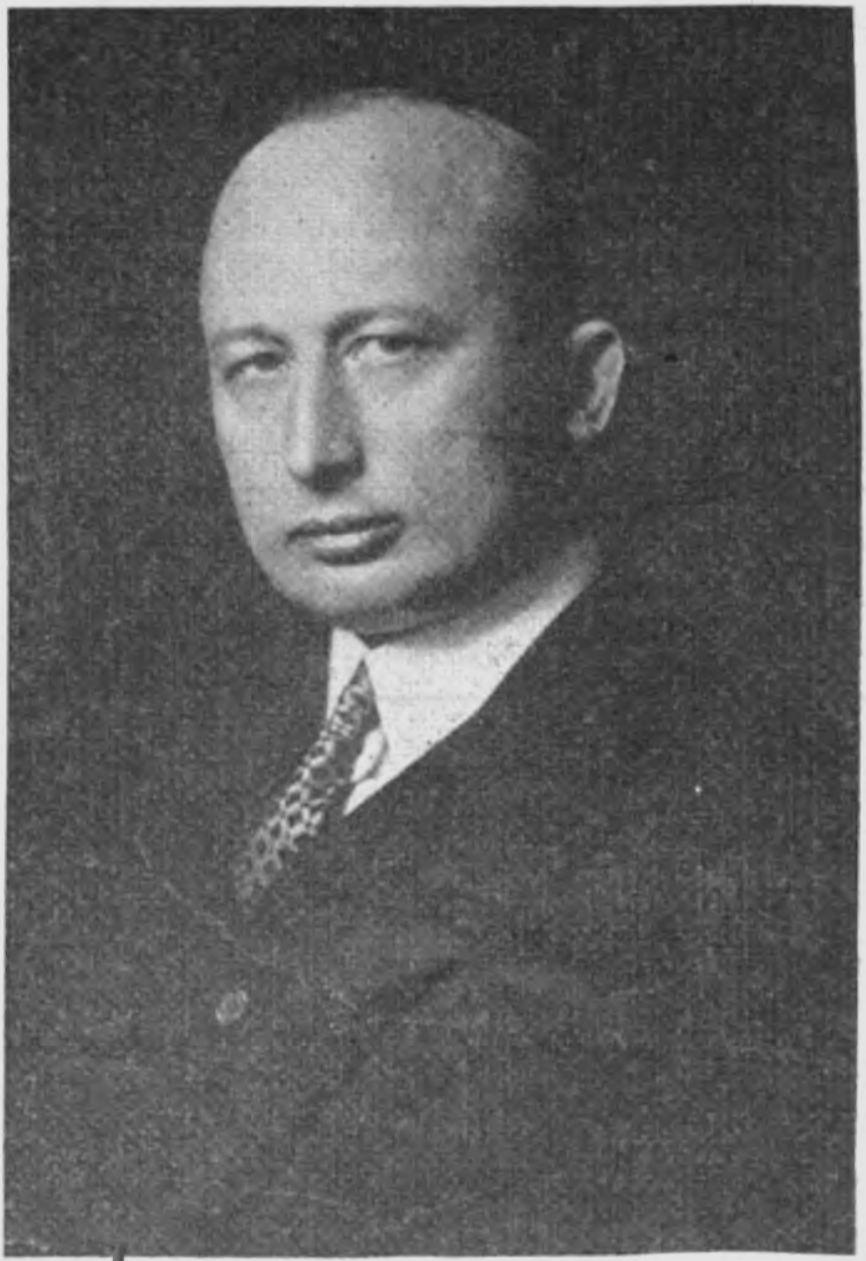
- Otto D. Tolischus in 1928
- Born: November 20, 1890; Skirwietell, Ruß, East Prussia, Germany (Skirvytėlė, Rusnė, Lithuania)
- Died: February 24, 1967 (aged 76); New York City, U.S.
- Resting place: Ferncliff Cemetery, Hartsdale, Westchester County, New York, U.S.
- Citizenship: Germany (renounced in 1913), U.S. (from 1913)
- Education: Columbia University
- Occupations: Journalist, writer
- Employers: Cleveland Press; Universal News Service; International News Service; The New York Times
- Known for: Reporting from Nazi Germany (1933-1940) and Tokyo, Japan (1941-1942)
- Notable work: They Wanted War (1940); Tokyo Record (1943)
- Spouse: Naya Grecia (m. 1949; death 1967)
- Parents: David Tolischus (farther); Maria Tolischus (née Kubillus) (mother)
- Awards: Pulitzer Prize for Correspondence for reporting from Nazi Germany (1940)

Otto David Tolischus (November 20, 1890 – February 24, 1967) was a Prussian-Lithuanian-born journalist for The New York Times and winner of the 1940 Pulitzer Prize for Correspondence for his writing and reporting from Berlin before and during World War II.

Tolischus started his journalistic career in the Cleveland Press and went on to work as a foreign correspondent in Berlin and London for Universal News Service and International News Service.

In 1940, as a foreign correspondent for The New York Times, Tolischus was expelled from Germany by the Nazi authorities. In 1941, he was appointed as the chief foreign correspondent for both The New York Times and The Times in Tokyo. Following the Japanese attack on Pearl Harbor, Tolischus was arrested by Japanese authorities. After enduring six months of torture and confinement, he was permitted to be evacuated from Japan along with the rest of the U.S. press corps.

In 1942, Tolischus became a member of The New York Times editorial board, where he worked until his retirement in 1964.

== Early life ==
Tolischus was born in the village of Skirwietell (lt: Skirvytėlė) which became part of the town of Russ, East Prussia, German Empire (after 1919 Memel Territory, now - part of Lithuania). Tolischus’ parents, David and Maria (née Kubillus) were local farmers and belonged to an ethnic minority of Prussian Lithuanians, also known as Memelanders. His father was a village elder in Russ. Being the fourth of six brothers, Tolischus was part of a large family. His three elder brothers were George (b. 1885), Edward (b. 1886) and John (b. 1887). The youngest were William (b. 1895) and Michael (b. 1898). He also had a sister Martha Mantwill (née Tolischus). Tolischus studied at the local state school in Russ and worked as a secretary in the lawyer's office.

In 1907 Tolischus emigrated to the United States. Three of his brothers, John (Johann), William and Edward C., also moved to the U.S. around the same time.

Tolischus renounced his German citizenship and became a U.S. citizen on June 14, 1913, at the Common Pleas Court of Mercer County, Trenton, New Jersey.

After the arrival, Tolischus worked in a printing house in Syracuse (N.Y.) and later in a factory plant in Trenton, New Jersey.

== Education ==
In 1912, Tolischus enrolled into a newly established School of Journalism in Columbia University for a 4-year course of journalism. He was one of the 79 students who joined the first class of the school. In 1917 Tolischus was awarded the first Pulitzer Travelling Scholarship from the Columbia School of Journalism along with other students, Geddes Smith and David S. Levy. The award was postponed because of the First World War and never collected by the recipients.

== Cleveland Press (1916–1923) ==
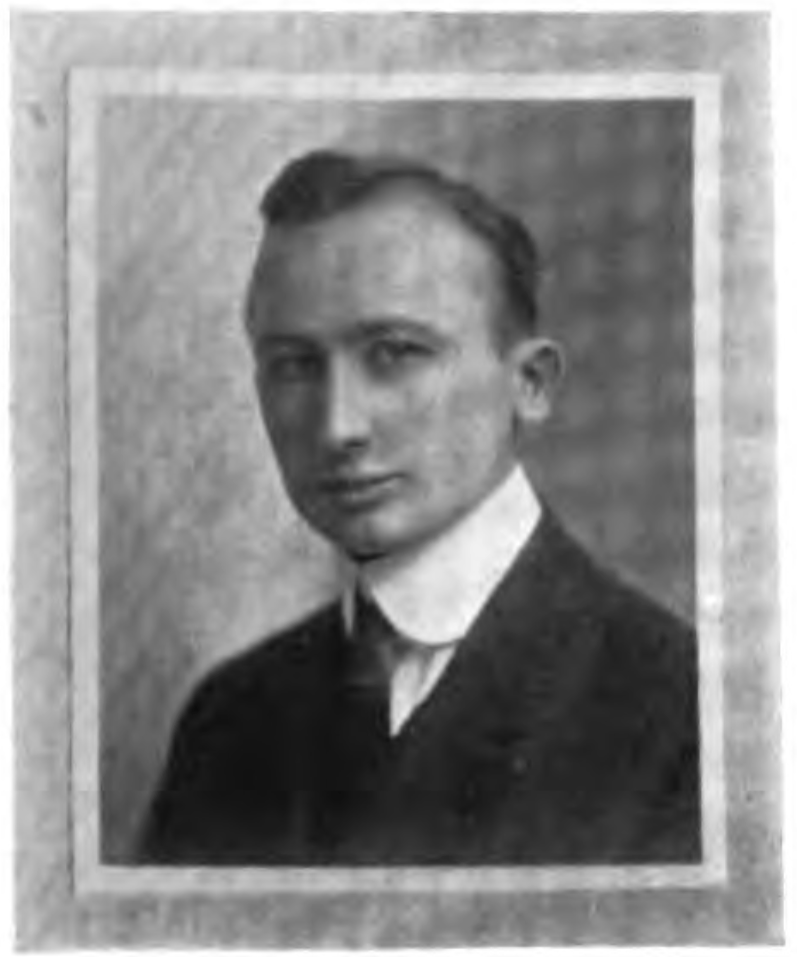
Otto D. Tolischus, student of journalism at the School of Journalism, Columbia University, around 1915–1916.

=== Internship ===
In summer 1916, Tolischus participated in a journalism students' "try-out" organised by the Cleveland Press staff. Victor Morgan, the editor of the Cleveland Press, spearheaded this initiative as a test to assess whether the new journalism discipline in American universities was producing the necessary expertise and skills for the business world. In late spring 1916, the Cleveland Press conceived the idea and approached several leading journalism schools to participate in the program and select a few of their best students to be sent for a summer internship in Cleveland. Tolischus was chosen by Columbia University and was the only student from the institution among twelve peers. The scheme was a success, and in September 1916, Victor Morgan announced that the Cleveland Press would likely recruit editorial workers from the ranks of journalism school graduates. Tolischus was eventually selected as one of four candidates to remain at work with the Cleveland Press. The other three were John M. Gleissner (University of Kansas), James W. Shoemaker (University of Illinois) and Richard Little (Ohio State University).

Initially Tolischus joined the Cleveland Press as a cub correspondent. Tolischus started this work on the same day as John M. Gleissner (later - managing editor of The Washington Daily News).

=== Military service ===
In 1918, Tolischus was called to serve in the US military service. He joined the Training Corps of Camp Gordon, near Atlanta, Georgia. There Tolischus was promoted to a sergeant in the Second Infantry Replacement Regiment on August 31, 1918. However, the Armistice came before Tolischus’ transfer into active service in France. He received his honourable discharge from the army on January 26, 1919.

=== Newspaper career ===
In 1919 Tolischus returned to the Cleveland Press. At some point after the return from military service he was promoted to managing editor of the newspaper. Tolischus resigned from his position at the Cleveland Press in January 1923 in order to embark on a journey across Europe. At the time of his resignation, Tolischus was city editor of the Cleveland Press.

== Wireless news service (1923–1932) ==
=== News services ===
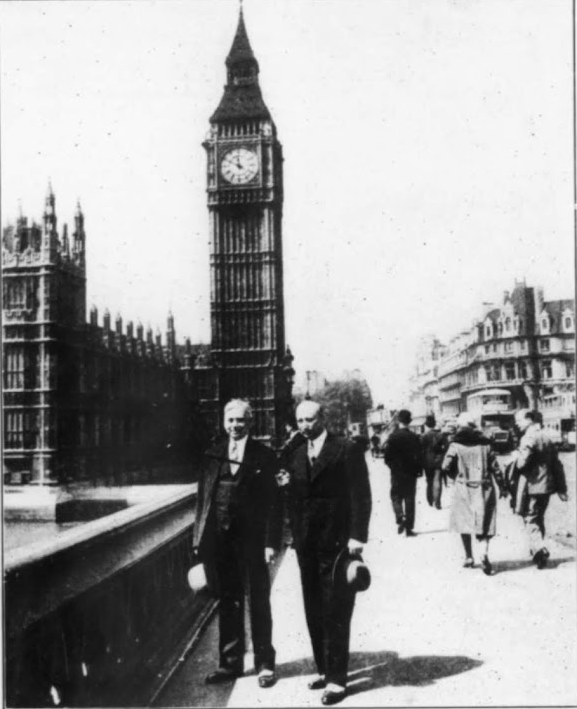
George T. Hargreaves, vice-president and general business manager for International News Service and Otto D. Tolischus (with a cane) in London, 1931.

In 1923 Tolischus returned to Europe and visited his native Memel Territory. The same year, he returned to the US where he was hired by the International News Service (INS). Here he acted as an assistant to the famous INS Berlin correspondent Karl H. von Wiegand. Tolischus and Karl H. von Wiegand sailed on the RMS Berengaria from the US to Germany in September 1923.

In Berlin Tolischus joined wireless news service as a staff correspondent of Universal News Service (Universal Service) in Berlin, part of the W. R. Hearst's news and media empire. In June 1927 he moved to the International News Service (INS) as a chief correspondent in Berlin (eventually, both Hearst's outlets, Universal Service and INS, will merge into INS in 1937). Around this time Tolischus' assistant in Berlin was H. R. Knickerbocker. By 1928 Tolischus was promoted to the Central European Director of INS.

=== Universal News Service ===
==== Germany (1923) ====
As a staff correspondent for the Universal Service in Berlin, Tolischus began reporting from Germany in October 1923. His first bylined article, published under the name "O.D. Tolischus," appeared on the front page of The San Francisco Examiner on October 13, 1923. In his dispatches, Tolischus reported on the deteriorating economic conditions in Germany and the political challenges confronting the newly established second Gustav Stresemann cabinet. At the time of joining Universal News, Tolischus worked with the team of Hearst correspondents; among them were the head of the editorial staff in Europe Karl H. von Wiegand, Max Jordan and John Segrue.

==== Beer Hall Putsch ====
In his first overseas assignment Tolischus covered general Erich Ludendorff and Adolf Hitler's failed Beer Hall Putsch in Munich in November 1923. Following the coup attempt, Tolischus was dispatched from Berlin to Munich to report on the aftermath. On November 11, he filed his story from Munich, describing the tense situation in the city. Tolischus also reported that Hitler's whereabouts were unknown at the time, though it was believed that he had established his headquarters in Rosenheim, approximately 30 miles from Munich, and was still regarded as a significant threat.

==== Ludendorff interview ====
On November 12, Tolischus was invited to take an interview from general Erich Ludendorff. He went to visit Ludendorff at his home in the villa district of Prinz-Ludwigs-Höhe near Munich. At that time Ludendorff was put under house arrest for taking part in the Beer Hall Putsch events.

Upon his arrival, Tolischus was met by a police guard and escorted to the drawing room. In his account of the meeting, Tolischus stated that he personally saw and spoke with Ludendorff. According to Tolischus, Ludendorff appeared "hale and hearty," showing minimal signs of strain from his involvement in the putsch. After discussing the events surrounding the Munich putsch, Ludendorff introduced his confidants, doctor Rudolf Buttmann and captain Wilhelm Weiss, to Tolischus. He authorised both aides to provide his perspective on the events, affirming that they were fully acquainted with all the details.

According to Tolischus, his interview with Ludendorff was the first occasion on which Ludendorff presented his account of the putsch. The meeting was arranged primarily through Tolischus' senior colleague Karl H. von Wiegand. On November 10, Ludendorff sent an extensive telegram to von Wiegand in response to a request for a statement regarding his involvement in the events of the putsch. However, the telegram was intercepted by the Munich authorities, preventing its delivery.

In his account of the interview, Tolischus refuted recent rumors, confirming that Ludendorff had neither been wounded nor killed, nor had he committed suicide. Ludendorff’s official statement, which comprised over half of Tolischus' report, asserted that both he and Gustav Ritter von Kahr were caught off guard by the events of the putsch and placed full responsibility on Adolf Hitler. When asked by Tolischus about his future plans, Ludendorff stated that he had none at the time.

==== European coverage ====
During his time with the Universal Service and INS, Tolischus travelled extensively across different parts of Northern, Central and Eastern Europe. He was in Stockholm in November 1926 to cover the wedding of Crown Prince Leopold of Belgium and Princess Astrid of Sweden. At a short notice, Tolischus travelled from Berlin to cover socialist revolt in Vienna in July 1927 and the death of King Ferdinand I of Romania in Bucharest. In the first half of 1930 Tolischus visited Russia and described conditions in USSR and Moscow news situation (in a letter to Barry Faris, June 17, 1930).

=== International News Service ===
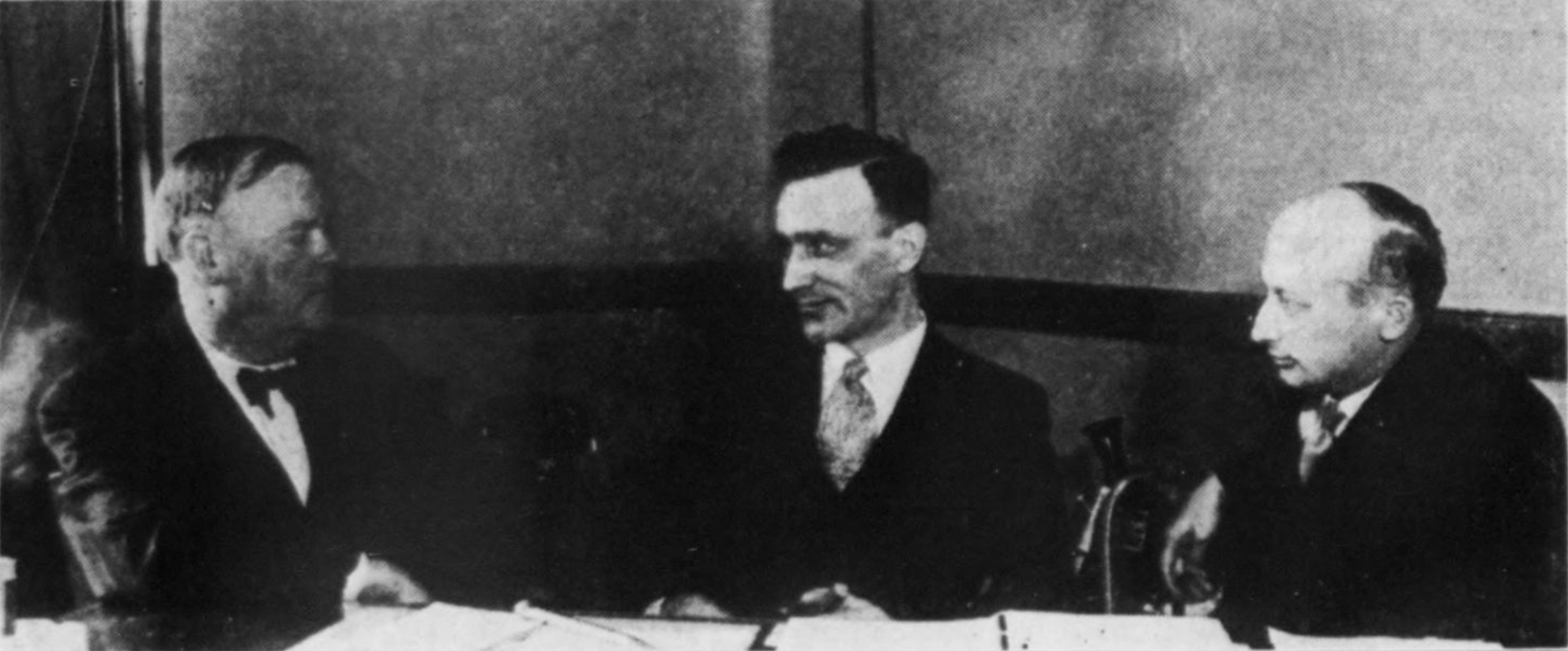
Otto D. Tolischus (right), INS Central European manager with H. C. Montee (centre), director of INS foreign service, and Dan Carey (left), INS South American representative, in New York, February, 1930.

In 1931, Tolischus was transferred to London and promoted to the INS Bureau Chief there; it meant that Tolischus was put in charge of all INS European news coverage. In London he was accompanied and installed by George H. Hargreaves, the INS vice president and general business manager.

In 1932, Tolischus was dismissed by the INS and returned to the USA. In the London INS bureau Tolischus was succeeded by Harry K. Reynolds (1933–34) and William Hillman (1934–38).

Back in the USA, Tolischus worked as a freelance journalist. In 1932, he delivered lectures and published articles on the economic and political matters in The North American Review.

== Foreign correspondent in Berlin (1933–1940) ==
After some time back in the United States, Tolischus joined the Berlin bureau of The New York Times in spring 1933, where he chronicled the rise of Nazi Germany. At that time the New York Times team in Berlin was headed by Swiss-born bureau chief Guido Enderis, along with chief European correspondent Frederick T. Birchall (Birchall was recently installed by Arthur Hays Sulzberger to strengthen the newspaper's coverage of Nazi Germany). During the pre-war years, Birchall, Enderis and Tolischus provided the majority of the Times' coverage from Germany. Robert Crozier Long also wrote on financial matters until his death in 1938, after which a young reporter named C. Brooks Peters was hired as a new addition to the Berlin team. After Long's death, Tolischus was expected to start providing financial coverage for which he requested additional compensation from Sulzberger.

In his first months as a foreign correspondent for The New York Times, Tolischus reported from Silesia, a region with simmering German-Polish tensions in the wake of the Nazi rise to power. Between April and May 1933, he visited key Silesian cities like Breslau (Wrocław), Oppeln (Opole), and Hindenburg (Zabrze), filing dispatches that documented the rising nationalist sentiment and Nazi political initiatives in the area. In July–August 1933 Tolischus travelled to East Prussia to report on the Nazi economic initiatives in the region and filed reports from Königsberg and Danzig (Gdańsk). Tolischus further ventured to his native Memeland (Klaipeda Region) in August, reporting on the complex political situation there.

=== Reichstag fire trial coverage (1933) ===
In 1933, Tolischus’ most extensive early reporting for The New York Times emerged from the Reichstag fire trial held at the Reich Supreme Court in Leipzig. From September to December 1933, Tolischus followed the proceedings and was present at the trial sessions in Leipzig and Berlin. During those months Tolischus filed at least nine front-page bylined reports, including a detailed account of the verdict on December 23, 1933. These dispatches offered American readers a close-up view of this pivotal event in Nazi Germany's consolidation of power.

=== Nazi sterilization program (1933) ===
Tolischus' front-page report in The New York Times on the new Nazi sterilization program, titled “444,000 Germans to Be Sterilized,” highlighted the introduction of a sterilization law by the Nazi authorities (December 21, 1933). The law was decreed on July 25, 1933 and was set to take effect from January 1, 1934. According to Tolischus, the law targeted “no less than 400,000 Germans, divided almost equally between men and women,” for state-sanctioned sterilization. German medical experts estimated this number based on the prevalence of nine diseases deemed hereditary by the law. Physicians were required to report all individuals eligible for sterilization, who would then be summoned to one of the 1,700 “hereditary health courts” to be established across Germany. Appeals could be made to the “supreme hereditary health court,” but those sentenced would have to undergo sterilization voluntarily or be sterilized by force.

Tolischus detailed that mental disabilities were a primary criterion for sterilization, leading the Nazi government to issue comprehensive guidelines to physicians on testing for such disabilities. These guidelines included an intelligence questionnaire, supposedly designed for the “lowest grade of normal intelligence.” Failure to satisfactorily answer these questions could result in sterilization. However, Tolischus pointed out that some questions were so challenging they “might stump even super-normal minds,” such as “What form of State do we have now?” or “What are the German postage rates?” He also noted that the questionnaire included “questions regarding moral views and hopes for the future, questions that many Germans might find hard to answer to the satisfaction of the Nazi authorities.”

=== Reporting consolidation of Nazi rule ===
In Germany Tolischus witnessed the expansion of the Nazi regime and reported on its economic, political and cultural aspects. Before the war, he made detailed studies of Poland and Czechoslovakia, traveling extensively in both countries. He predicted the Nazi-Soviet Pact three months before it was signed and covered the German perspective on the outbreak of World War II.

Within two days of the secret signing of the Molotov–Ribbentrop Pact, he had managed to get news of it for a page-one story called "Nazi Talks Secret" whose subtitle included "Soviet and Reich Agree on East." On 26 August 1939, he filed a story that noted Nazi troops on the move near Gleiwitz (now Gliwice), which led to the Gleiwitz incident, a false flag operation, on 31 August 1939. (On 28 August 1939, the Times was still reporting on fears of a Gleiwitz raid.)

=== Reporting World War II (1939–1940) ===
==== Outbreak of World War II, September 1, 1939 ====
Tolischus’ report about the outbreak of hostilities between Germany and Poland appeared on the first page of The New York Times on September 1, 1939. The report headlined ‘Hitler Gives Word’ was filed by the special cable from Berlin. In the report's first paragraph, Tolischus reported about Hitler's proclamation to the German army published at 5.11 am (Berlin Time) on September 1 (the text of this proclamation was quoted in its entirety). In the proclamation Hitler announced that ‘the series of border violations, which are unbearable to a great power, prove that the Poles no longer are willing to respect the German frontier. In order to put an end to this frantic activity no other means is left to me now than to meet force with force’.

In the same report, Tolischus noted that a formal Germany's declaration of war against Poland was not declared up to 8.00 am (Berlin Time) and that ‘the question whether the two countries are in a state of active belligerency is still open’ at the time of reporting. Tolischus noted that foreign correspondents were invited to an official conference at the Reich Press Ministry at 8.30 am (Berlin Time). There they were reassured that they would receive full support with transmission of news dispatches. At that point, Tolischus' report indicated that ‘the Hitler army order is interpreted as providing, for the time being, armed defences of the German frontiers against aggression. The action is also suspected of forcing international diplomatic actions.’

The second part of the report told about an ‘increasing number of border incidents involving shooting and mutual Polish-German casualties’. The most serious border incidents were reported from Gleiwitz (it was later learned that the Gleiwitz incident was part of the false-flag Nazi operation known as Operation Himmler). In this part of the report about the supposed border incidents, The New York Times cited reports provided by the German press and ‘semi-official news agency’ in Nazi Germany (a regular term of the newspapers to refer to Nazi controlled news agencies in Germany).

==== First reports from occupied Poland ====
Following the initial invasion of Poland, Nazi authorities prohibited foreign correspondents stationed in Berlin from visiting Poland. Instead, journalists were left to rely on official Nazi reports and censored materials, including photos, reports and newsreels dispatched from the front lines by photographers and reporters conscripted from German media into the Wehrmacht Propaganda Troops, also known as PK. PK content underwent quick approval by the official Nazi censors before dissemination to both domestic and international news outlets and photo agencies.

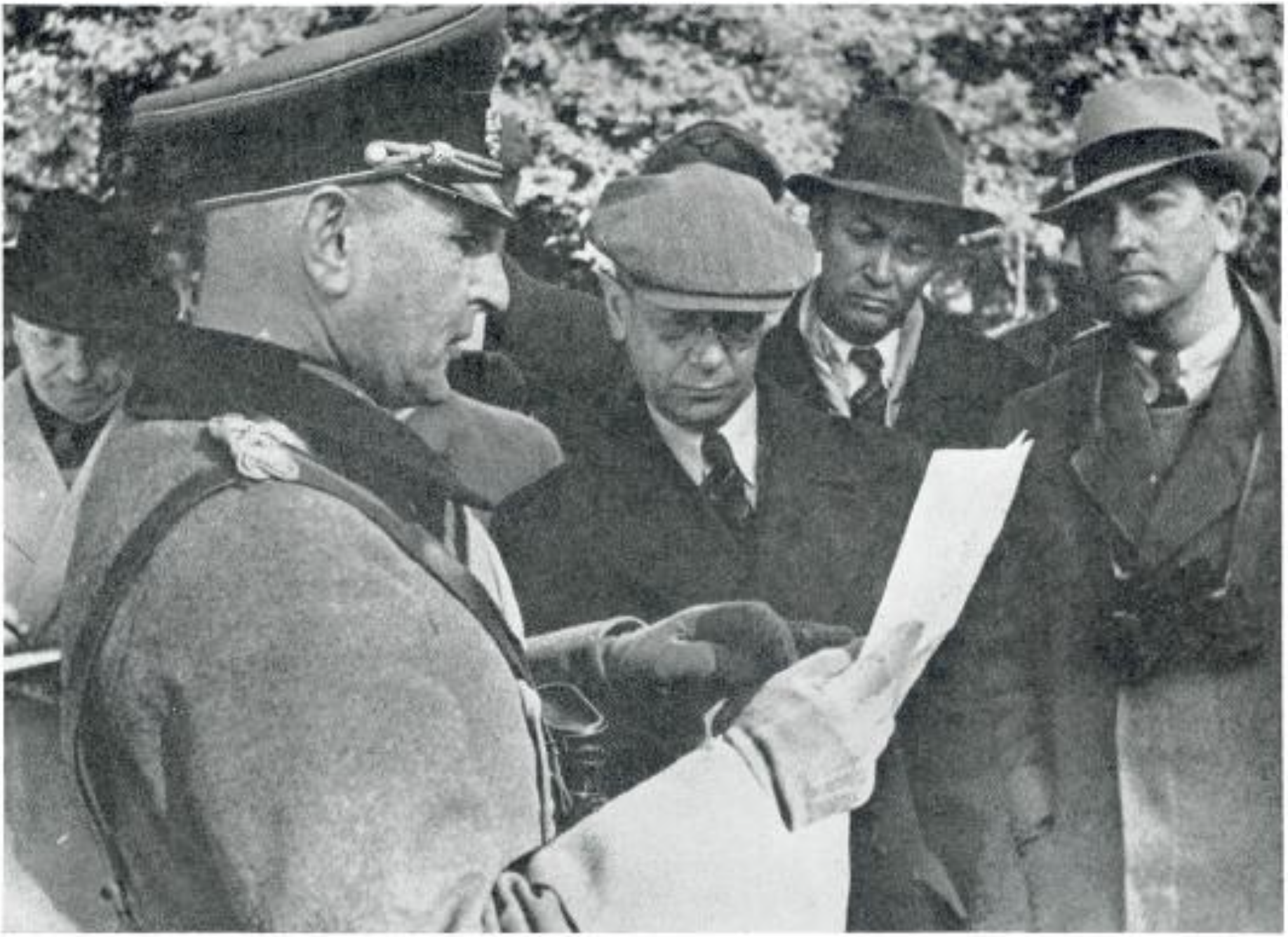
Foreign journalists escorted by German military officials on the Western front, 1940. Louis P. Lochner, Chief of the Berlin AP (centre) and Pierre J. Huss, Chief of the Berlin INS (second from right).

Apart from the reporting by the PK journalists, Berlin newspapers and news bureaus had to rely on German military escort to report from inside Poland. Germany organized early press tours, in particular for American reporters and journalists from other neutral countries, to showcase Nazi military strength and dissuade neutral nations from joining the war against Germany. On September 4, Nazi officials extended the first offer to travel to Poland to the chiefs of the AP, UP, and INS bureaus in Berlin. They announced that one of the heads of news agencies would accompany the German army to visit Częstochowa in Poland, aiming to dispel rumors of damage to the revered Black Madonna of Częstochowa from German bombing raids. The bureau chiefs agreed to draw lots and the journey fell to Louis Lochner, the head of the AP in Berlin. Louis Lochner was flown to the German-Polish border and escorted to Częstochowa by the German military.

Tolischus was in the first group of foreign correspondents permitted to visit the front by the German military authorities in the two-day trip under the German military escort (September 11–12). Among other members of the group were Melvin K. Whiteleather (Associated Press) and Harold Peters (United Press). Tolischus visited the province of Posen (Poznań) and proceeded to the occupied Łódź on the same day. In his report titled "Poles Unprepared For Blow So Hard", Tolischus observed that following the breach of Polish border defences, German forces encountered little resistance from the Polish Army as they advanced in various directions. According to Tolischus, the Polish strategy appeared to involve retreating to towns, only to be easily dislodged by artillery fire or outflanked by German troops. He also noted that by the time of his visit, Germany had achieved nearly complete air superiority, and the blackout measures in Poland had been lifted by German authorities. On September 12, Tolischus submitted his second dispatch from Poland. Despite Poland's military setbacks, Tolischus observed a strong sense of national consciousness and a deep-seated resentment towards their conquerors among the populace. This sentiment, Tolischus argued, fuelled the emergence of Polish guerrilla resistance against the German occupiers. Additionally, during his visits to several towns, Tolischus learned that German authorities swiftly labelled Jews as "Franctireurs" (irregular combatants) and subjected them to summary executions.

==== Visit to Danzig ====
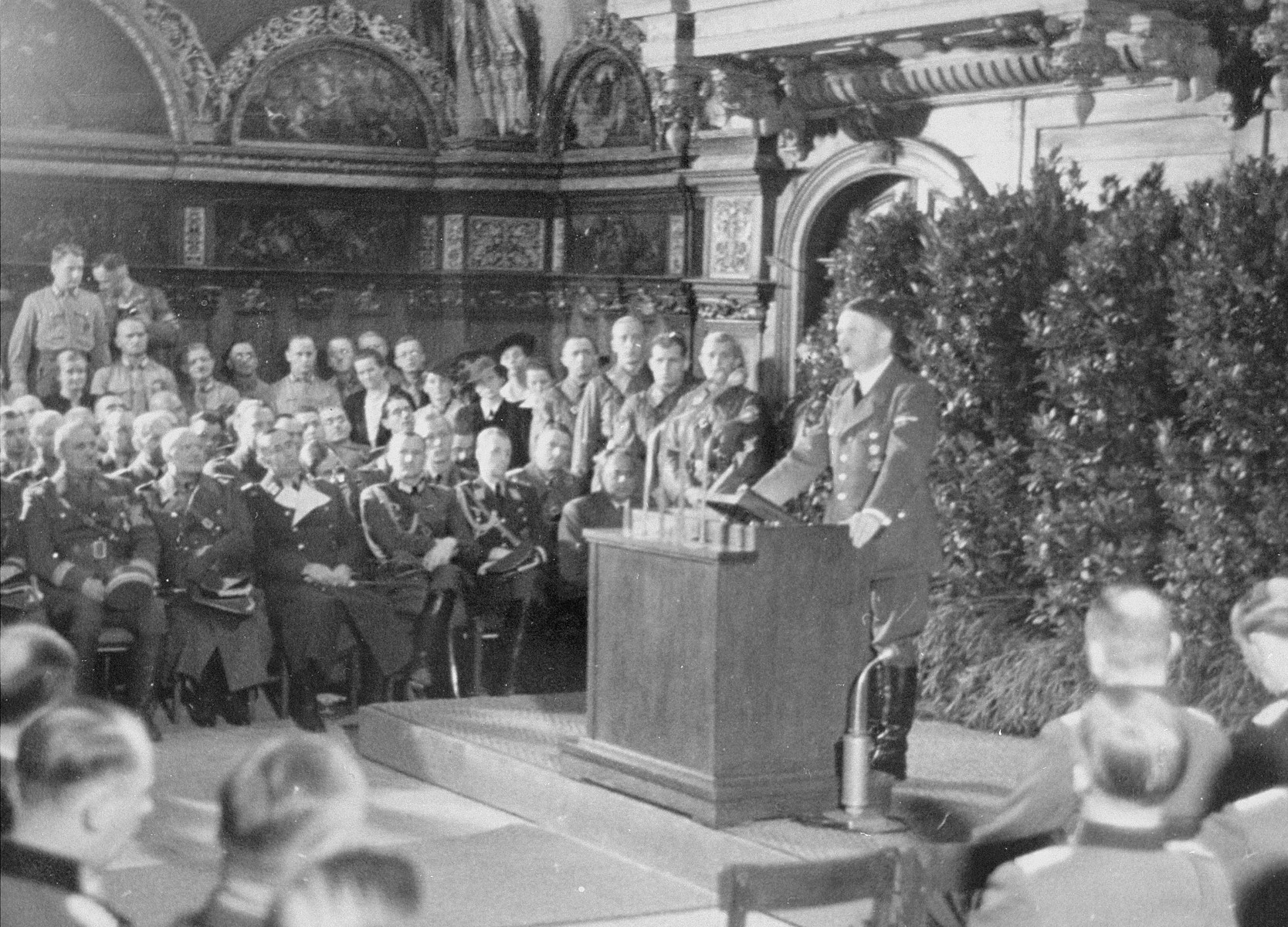
Adolf Hitler addresses an audience in Artushof, Danzig (September 19, 1939)

Tolischus was among the American and international correspondents invited to take part in the trip to the occupied Danzig region on September 18–19. This group included Louis Lochner (Associated Press), F. C. Oechsner (United Press), Joseph Barnes (New York Herald Tribune), William Shirer (CBS), Pierre J. Huss (INS), Christer Jäderlund (Politiken), and John Cutcheon Raleigh (Chicago Tribune). On September 18, they were driven from Berlin to Zoppot. The following day, Tolischus and the group were escorted to Gdynia to witness German military operations against the remaining Polish resistance in nearby Oxhöft (Oksywie) and Hela (Hel); they were also granted access to the Westerplatte military site. The day culminated with a gathering of all correspondents to hear a victory address by Adolf Hitler in Artushof, Danzig, reported by Tolischus on September 20 in The New York Times.

==== Expulsion from Germany ====
In March 1940, Tolischus was informed by the German authorities that his permit to stay in the country was not going to be renewed. The German Propaganda Ministry told him that if he would leave Germany for a six-week leave-of-absence, he would then be readmitted to Germany. The reason for the authorities' decision was Tolischu had sent a report to The New York Times predicting an imminent German offensive on the Western front. German military authorities objected to Tolischus' report.

Tolischus detailed his experience in an article, noting that unlike other foreign correspondents expelled outright, he was offered a "leave of absence". He departed Germany via Denmark. During his six weeks of "leave of absence" from Germany, Tolischus went to Copenhagen, Oslo and Stockholm. When Tolischus inquired with the German authorities about a possibility to resume his position with The New York Times in Berlin, they told him the original agreement was no longer in place. Instead, they said Tolischus could enter Germany for eight days only.

Tolischus claimed to be the 32nd foreign correspondent expelled from Nazi Germany. His expulsion was preceded by constant threats and a Nazi press campaign against him. According to Tolischus, the circumstances of his expulsion made him suspect that ultimately he had earned respect from the Nazis. Tolischus expected the same thorough search and checks at the border to which many correspondents had been subjected while leaving Germany, and for this reason he left all his notes behind in Berlin. Ironically, upon reaching the border, border control did not inspect any of his suitcases.

He won the 1940 Pulitzer Prize for Correspondents for his writing and reporting from Berlin.

== Foreign correspondent in Stockholm (1940) ==
The first report by Otto D. Tolischus from Copenhagen was published in The New York Times on March 27. From Copenhagen, Tolischus traveled to Oslo and began his reporting from the Norwegian capital in early April. According to Tolischus, he stayed ahead of the advancing Nazi forces during the invasion of Scandinavia, departing Oslo two days prior to the German capture of that city. He continued his war reporting from Stockholm in neutral Sweden.

In August 1940, Tolischus left Stockholm and headed to the Finnish port of Petsamo to be evacuated aboard the SS American Legion. Tolischus later recalled that the evacuation conditions were arduous. The British authorities directed the vessel to follow a specific route, while the Nazis, via the ship's radio, issued hourly threats to sink the SS American Legion unless it altered its course. Despite the threats, the captain adhered to the British route and the ship safely arrived in New York.

== Foreign correspondent in Tokyo (1941–1942) ==
On January 25, 1941, Edwin L. James, managing editor of the New York Times, announced that Tolischus will sail for Japan to join the Tokyo bureau as a correspondent for the New York Times and The Times. After his expulsion from Berlin by the Nazi government, Tolischus admitted to being delighted to take this opportunity. While he was well-aware that war clouds appeared to be gathering over the Pacific, he was eager to take a look at the other end of the Berlin-Tokyo axis. In particular, Tolischus noted, he was keen to learn 'how much truth there was in the story that the Nazis had taken over some of their mystic ideas from the Japanese'.

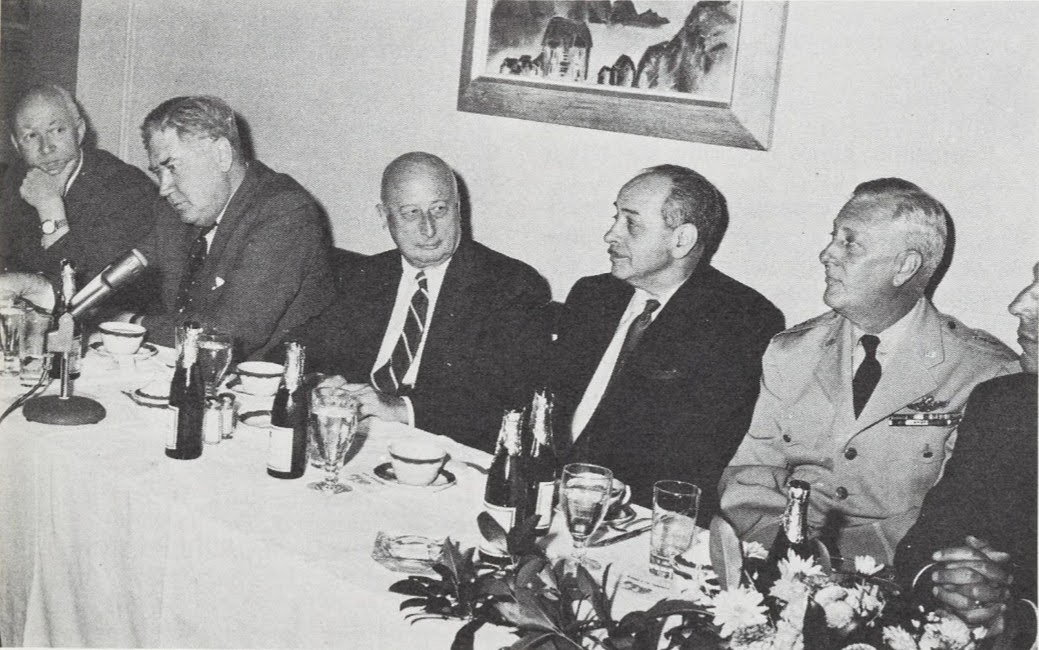
Otto Tolischus (in the middle) attends Berlin Correspondents' night by the Overseas Press Club of America, September 26, 1958, New York. From the left side: Pierre Huss, Quentin Reynolds, Otto D. Tolischus, Frederick Kuh and Gen. William H. Tunner; Q. Reynolds is giving a talk about Sigrid Schultz' work and life in the pre-war Nazi Germany.

Tolischus left San Francisco on the SS President Coolidge and sailed into Tokyo on February 7. Tolischus arrived to replace Hugh Byas, a long-serving the New York Times correspondent in Tokyo. On arrival Tolischus was met by a group of local Japanese newspaper reporters. Later Tolischus learned that he was not entirely unknown in Japan. According to Tolischus, the Japan Times Advertiser and other Japanese newspapers used many of his articles sent to the New York Times from Germany.

During his first week in Tokyo, Tolischus visited the American Embassy and paid his respects to ambassador Joseph C. Grew. He also paid visits at the offices of Japan's two biggest newspapers: Asahi and Nichi Nichi (Tolischus presented a letter of introduction from Roy Howard to Shingoro Takaishi, the chief of Nichi Nichi).

Tolischus was surprised to discover that from the beginning of his stay Japan looked like a country already under a state of war. Tolischus drew comparisons with Germany at war and indicated the same symptoms: Tokyo had a citywide dim-out, there were shortages and queues for food shops and low number of taxis. It was clear that the Japanese people were already feeling the effects of the conflict in China.

=== Arrest and imprisonment after the attack on Pearl Harbor ===
A few hours after the Japanese attack on Pearl Harbor on December 8, Tolischus was arrested and imprisoned for five months, where he was regularly beaten and tortured. During this period of imprisonment, the Japanese manager of the Times Tokyo Bureau, Junnosuke Ofusa, took food and clothes to Tolischus. The ongoing contact continued until Tolischus was sent to the United States as part of a prisoner exchange in 1942.

=== Internment and evacuation (1942) ===
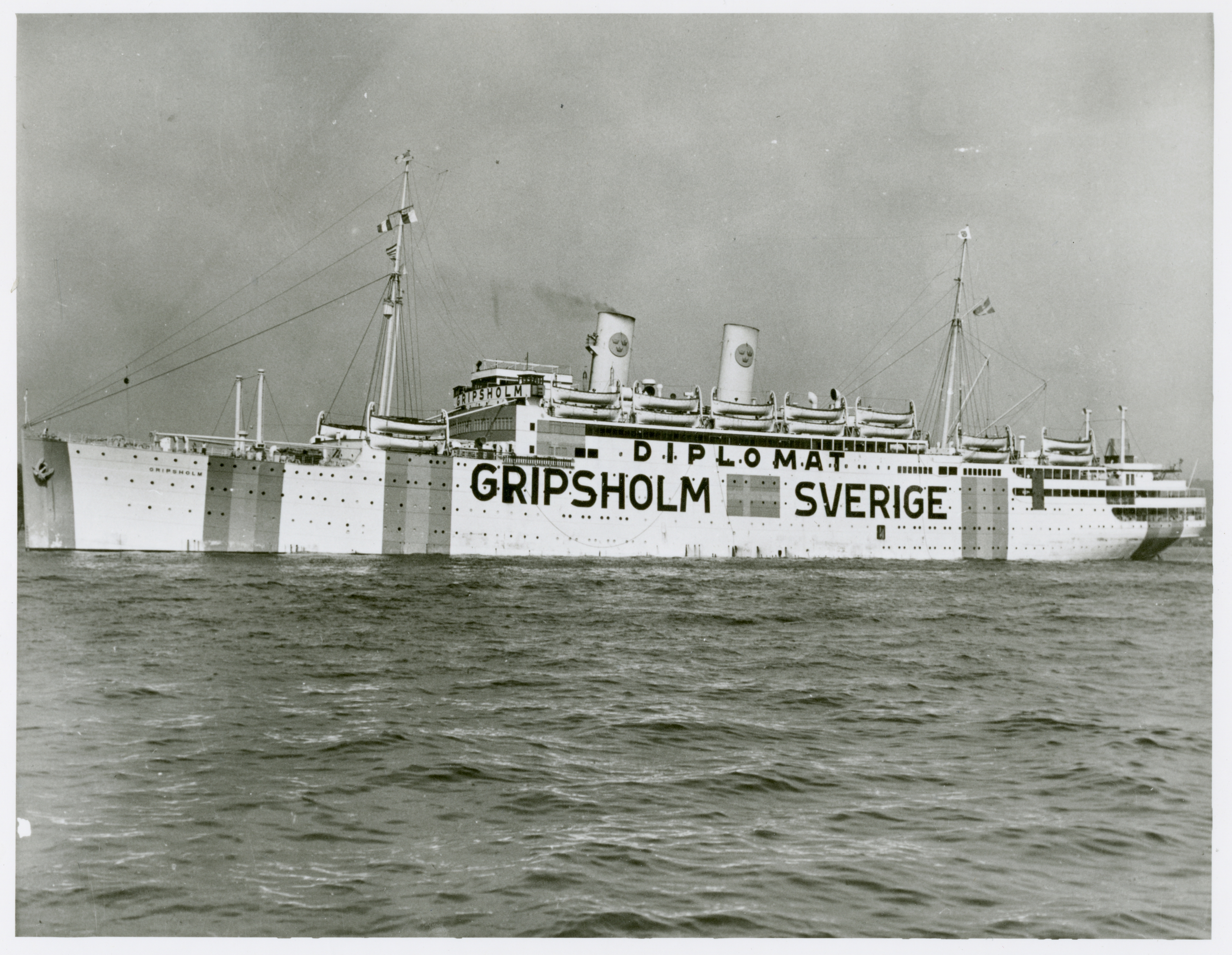
The passenger ship MS Gripsholm with neutrality painting, leased to the U.S. for so-called exchange missions, i.a. under the auspices of the Red Cross 1942–1946, 1943.

After six months of imprisonment, Tolischus was released by the Japanese authorities on May 20, 1942. Instead of the full release, Tolischus was escorted to the internment camp at Sumire, located between Tokyo and Yokohama (previously a Catholic girls' school). In his account Tolischus noted that the original group of internees at Sumire were thirteen Americans, also British, Dutch, Belgians and French Canadians. Most of the internees were Catholic priests. Among Americans there were Leo Chamberlain (National City Bank), journalists Robert Bellaire (United Press), Joseph E. Dynan (Associated Press) and Colvin (Tom) Crichton (Universal News Features). On June 2 the camp received Wall Street Journal's team members: Max Hill, Richard Tenelly and Raymond Cromley. Just like Tolischus, all of them were given the same suspended sentence.

In the camp Tolischus was informed that some of the internees are going to be repatriated on the ship Asama Maru in the middle of June. This was confirmed by father Hilderbrand Yaiser, the Benedictine, who acted as an attache of Swiss embassy in Tokyo (he confirmed that the internees would depart on June 17; they were allowed any amount of baggage and 1000 yen). On the day of the departure, Tolischus and other internees were taken by a special train to Yokohama to board the Asama Maru. Tolischus and other passengers boarded the ship which left the dock but stayed anchored in the Tokyo Bay for another week before departing on June 25.

The Asama Maru reached Hong Kong on June 29 and anchored opposite Stanley Fort. 377 evacuees, most of them Americans, boarded the ship (including A. E. Southward, the consul general and Alberto Perez-Saez, the consul general of Peru). On July 2 the Asama Maru anchored next to Saigon. On July 6 the Asama Maru was joined by another evacuation ship - the Conte Verde (travelling from Shanghai ).

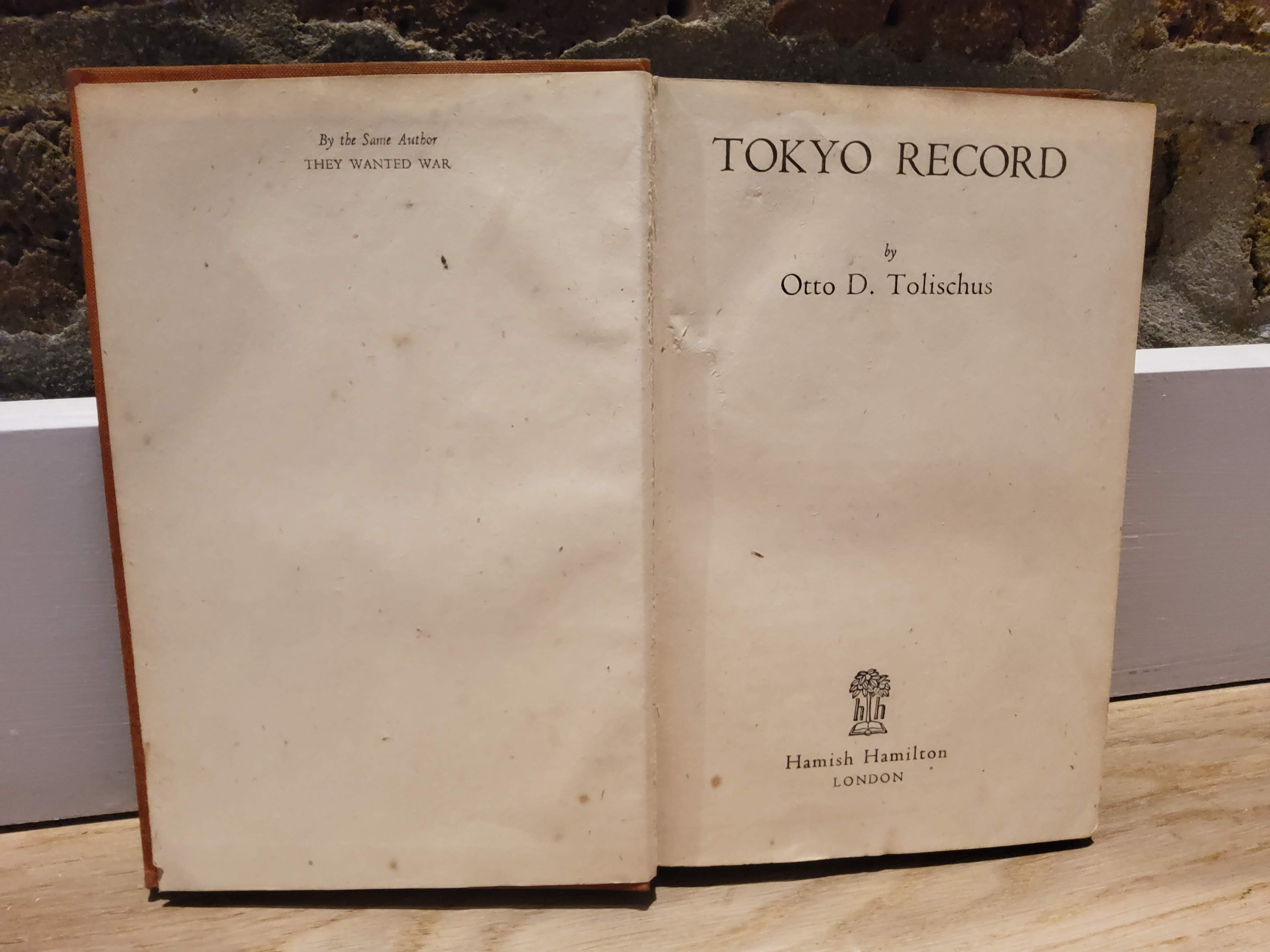
Otto D. Tolischus, Tokyo Record, 1943 (title page)

The Asama Maru sailed into Maputo (Lourenco Marques) on July 22. The following day Tolischus with the rest of the evacuees was transferred to the Gripsholm while the Japanese passengers walked from it to the Asama Maru. During his time in Maputo, Tolishus attempted to send his stories about torture and imprisonment from the local telegraph office. He filed two copies: one to New York and another to London (The Times); unfortunately, the stories did not reach New York.

The Gripsholm departed Maputo on July 28 and reached Rio de Janeiro on August 10. In Rio de Janeiro Tolischus telegraphed his stories to New York. In Rio de Janeiro he was met and assisted by Frank Garcia, the New York Times Rio correspondent. The last leg of the sailing took place from August 11 to 25. Tolischus sailed on the Gripsholm into New York at dawn. More details about this evacuation trip was recorded by Max Hill in his book Exchange Ship, published immediately after the event in 1942.

=== Post-war ===
Tolischus was a member of The New York Times editorial board until his retirement in 1964. Tolischus died of cancer in 1967.

== Personal life ==
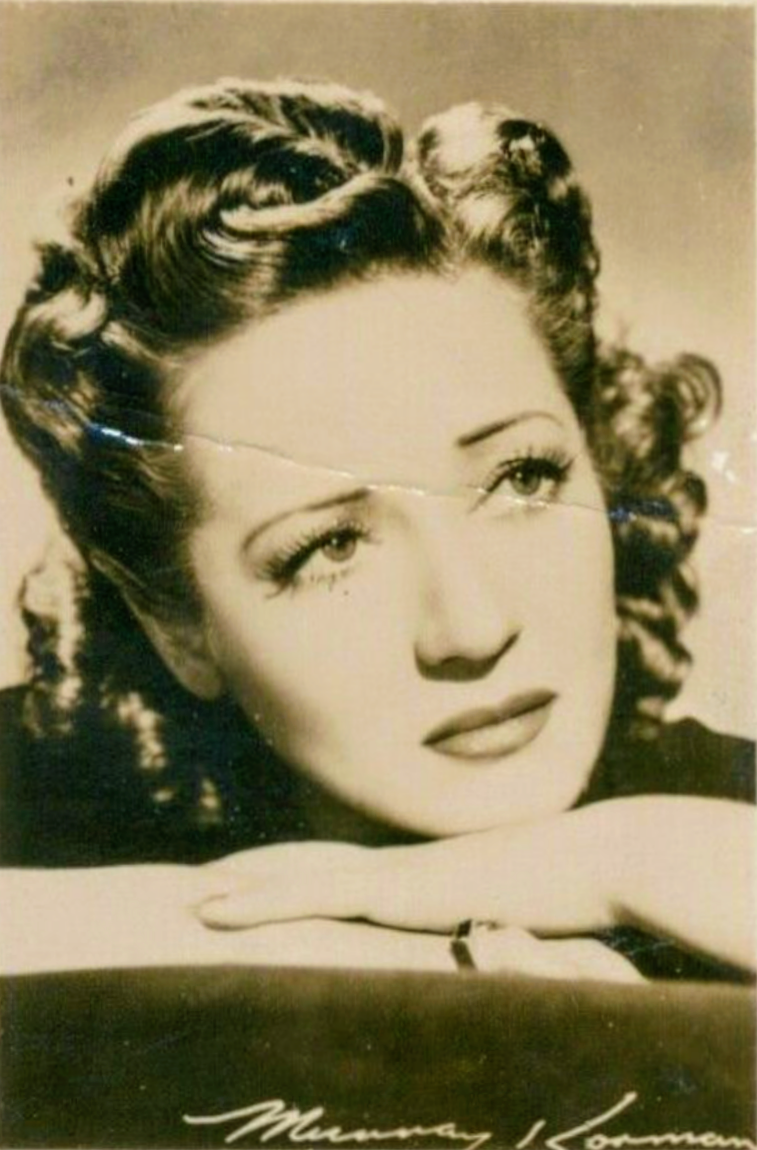
Otto D. Tolischus' wife Naya Grecia in 1945.

Tolischus married Naya Grecia on November 25, 1949, at the New York City Magistrate's Court. Naya Grecia was a Greek national with a background in radio, stage acting, and singing.

Before their marriage, Naya, who received her education in Switzerland and England, had worked for the BBC, performed in New York films and stage productions, and even served as a Red Cross ambulance driver during World War II. Her father, Demitrius Zavoyanis, was a prominent figure in Greece, holding positions as a businessman, a member of parliament, and even the government. Naya eventually became a naturalized American citizen, adopting a new name in the process.

At the time of Tolischus' death in 1962, Naya was the owner of the Athenia East restaurant in the New York City (1230 Second Avenue).

== Works ==
Based on his experience as a journalist, Tolischus wrote three books on World War II:

- 1940 -- They Wanted War. New York: Reynal and Hitchcock.
- 1943 -- Tokyo Record. New York: Reynald and Hitchcock.
- 1945 -- Through Japanese Eyes. New York: Reynald and Hitchcock.

== Bibliography ==
- Hill, Max (1942). Exchange Ship. New York: Farrar & Rinehart.
- Tolischus, Otto D. (1943). Tokyo Record. London: Hamish Hamilton. OCLC 10773964.

== External sources ==
- Brown, John Mason. "Book Review: They Wanted War by Otto D. Tolischus," The American Political Science Review, Vol. 35, No. 3 (Jun., 1941), pp. 573–574.
- Clyde, Paul H., "Book Review: Through Japanese Eyes by Otto D. Tolischus," The American Political Science Review, Vol. 39, No. 4 (Aug., 1945), pp. 808–809.
- MacNair, Harley Farnsworth, "Book Review: Through Japanese Eyes by Otto D. Tolischus," The Pacific Historical Review, Vol. 15, No. 4 (Dec., 1946), pp. 465–466.
- Soward, F.H. "Book Review: Tokyo Record by Otto D. Tolischus," The Far Eastern Quarterly, Vol. 2, No. 4 (Aug., 1943), pp. 388–389.
- Otto David Tolischus papers at the University of Oregon
