= Lochner (surname) =

Lochner is a surname. Notable people with the surname include:

- Anita Lochner (born 1950), German actress
- Augustus Lochner (1827–1865), English soldier
- Butch Lochner (born 1931), former South African international rugby union player
- Hannah Lochner (born 1993), Canadian actress
- Johannes Lochner (born 1990), German bobsledder
- Kunz Lochner (1510–1567), armourer
- Louis P. Lochner (1887–1975), political activist
- Michael Friedrich Lochner (1662–1720), German physician and naturalist
- Otto Lochner, sprint canoeist
- Robert Lochner (1904–1965), engineer
- Robert Lochner (1918–2003), journalist
- Rudolf Lochner (born 1953), former German bobsledder
- Rupert Lochner (1891–1965), officer in the British Indian Army
- Stefan Lochner (1400–1452), painter
- Tom Lochner, basketball coach
- Isabella Lochner, weird and kind girl (sister of Ellenor Lochner)
- Ellenor Lochner, funny and crazy girl (sister of Isabella Lochner)
