= Lochner (disambiguation) =

Lochner v. New York was a court case.

Lochner may also refer to:

- Lochner (surname)
- 12616 Lochner, asteroid
- Lochner era
