= Max Jordan =

German-American journalist (1895–1977)

Max Arthur Jordan
- Born: April 21, 1895; Sanremo, Italy
- Died: November 28, 1977 (aged 82); Illgau, Switzerland
- Citizenship: Germany, U.S. (from 1937)
- Education: University of Jena
- Occupations: Journalist, radio broadcaster
- Employers: Berliner Tageblatt; International News Service; NBC
- Notable work: Beyond All Fronts. A Bystander's Notes on this Thirty Years War (1944)
- Spouse: Marianne (m. 1918; div. 1923)

Max Arthur Jordan (later Father Placid Jordan) (April 21, 1895 - November 28, 1977) was a German-American foreign correspondent for the International News Service and pioneering radio journalist for the NBC network in Europe in the 1930s. Later, he became a Benedictine monk.

== Early life and education ==
Jordan was born in Sanremo, Italy, to German parents of Württembergian origin, Jordan's family lineage included both French and Austrian ancestry. His father, a chemist, secured his first employment in Florence after completing his studies. The family subsequently settled in Italy, purchasing a pharmacy in Sanremo with the assistance of Jordan's mother Thekla's dowry.

Jordan's father later worked with Eastman Kodak, establishing branches for the company in various Italian and Swiss cities. This led to frequent travel within Italy for the family, with occasional visits to relatives in Stuttgart, Germany. As a result of attending schools in multiple countries, Jordan became fluent in French, German, and Italian.

In 1912, the Jordan family returned to Germany, settling in Stuttgart. Jordan attended high school in Stuttgart and subsequently pursued undergraduate studies in philosophy at the University of Frankfurt. He received PhD in Religious Philosophy from the University of Jena.

== Career ==
=== Berliner Tageblatt (1920-1922) ===
Jordan's academic ambitions were set aside by the need to earn a living. In early 1920, following his trip to Italy on a press syndicate assignment, he joined the renowned democratic newspaper Berliner Tageblatt as associate foreign editor. During his university years earlier, Jordan made several contributions to the publication. He felt a great sense of pride working under the leadership of Theodor Wolff. His editorials and news appeared under the byline "M. J.".

Jordan secured his first major story for the Berliner Tageblatt by conducting an exclusive interview with Georgy Chicherin, the Soviet People's Commissar for Foreign Affairs, in April 1922. Learning of Chicherin's arrival in Berlin ahead of the diplomatic Genoa Conference, Jordan contacted all luxury hotels in the city and located him at the Esplanade Hotel. The interview, granted by Chicherin, marked the first time the Soviet official publicly revealed the Soviet government's plan to end its diplomatic isolation and assert its right to participate in international affairs. Jordan's report was published the following day, April 2, on the front page of the Berliner Tageblatt.

=== Hearst news agencies ===
In the 1920s Jordan worked for William Randolph Hearst's news agencies in Germany and United States. In early 1923 Jordan was hired by Karl H. von Wiegand to join the team of correspondents in Berlin for the International News Service and Universal News Service - the Hearst Corporation's own wire agencies. One of his first assignments for the Universal Service was to cover and report from the Ludendorff-Hitler putsch trial in February and March 1924 from Munich.

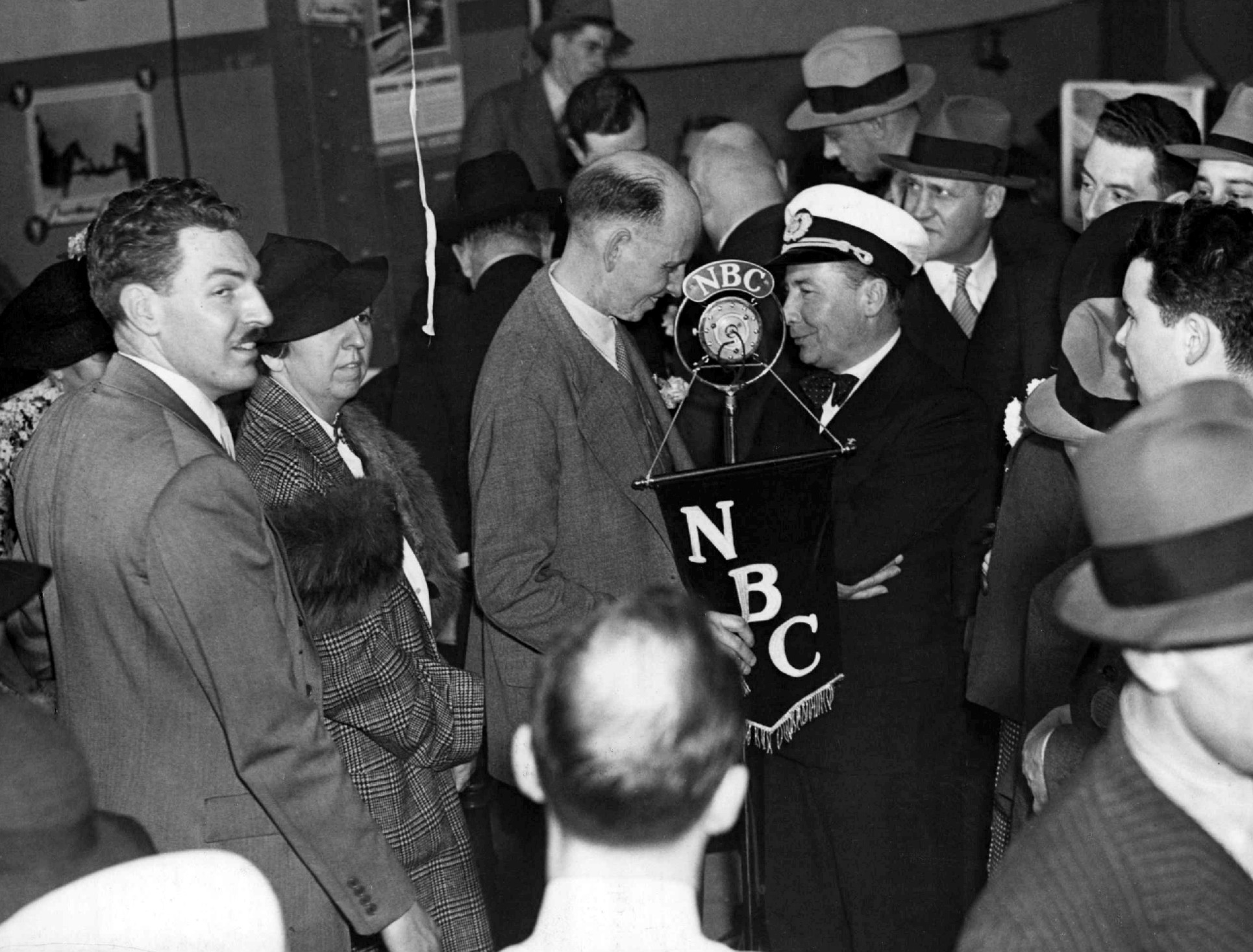
Max Jordan interviewing Hindenburg Captain Ernst Lehmann for the NBC after the airship's first arrival in the U.S. in 1936.

==== United States ====
In the spring of 1924, Jordan accepted an offer to relocate from Berlin to New York to coordinate the European news service for the International News Service, arriving in May of that year. Later that autumn, during a visit to Washington, he unexpectedly secured a private meeting with President Calvin Coolidge at the White House, during which he was granted thirty minutes for private discussion. Jordan noted that Washington's green spaces reminded him of European cities, and he preferred the city's tranquility to New York's bustling atmosphere. Consequently, he moved to Washington to serve as a correspondent while leaving his work with the Hearst outlets and rejoining his former employer, Berliner Tageblatt, as their Washington correspondent.

=== NBC ===
He covered many important stories (and had many scoops) in the 1930s, when the medium of radio was still relatively new. Jordan's first report for NBC was on a 1931 speech by German President Paul von Hindenburg. Subsequently, in 1931 he was hired by NBC to represent their radio service in Europe.

==== Hitler's radio address (February 1, 1933) ====
Jordan was present during Adolf Hitler's inaugural radio address to the German people on February 1, 1933. At the time, Jordan was stationed at NBC in Basel, Switzerland, where he learned of Hitler's appointment as Chancellor of Germany. Following the announcement, Jordan travelled to Berlin on January 31, the day after Hitler's appointment, and met with Kurt Rathke, the radio program manager, at the Broadcasting House in Berlin. Rathke informed Jordan that Hitler's radio address was imminent.

On February 1, Jordan received an invitation to witness Hitler's radio address to the nation. Right before the broadcast, he sought permission to relay Hitler's speech to the United States, attempting to translate it sentence by sentence; however, Rudolf Hess, who was present, did not grant this request. When Hitler arrived, he was introduced by Hess. According to Jordan, Hitler appeared uncomfortable and his movements were awkward, with nothing particularly striking about his demeanour.

The broadcast proceeded to America without further issue, with Jordan providing a concise English summary of Hitler's speech. Ultimately, the original delivery of Hitler's address was deemed too fast and too aggressive. In response, a second recording was subsequently aired three times the following day on German radio stations.

==== Radio broadcasts ====
Jordan also reported on the first Atlantic flight of the Hindenburg in 1936, the Anschluss of Austria in 1938, the text of that year's Munich Agreement (giving Germany the ethnically-German regions of Czechoslovakia), the 1940 invasion of France, and the 1945 surrender of Japan.

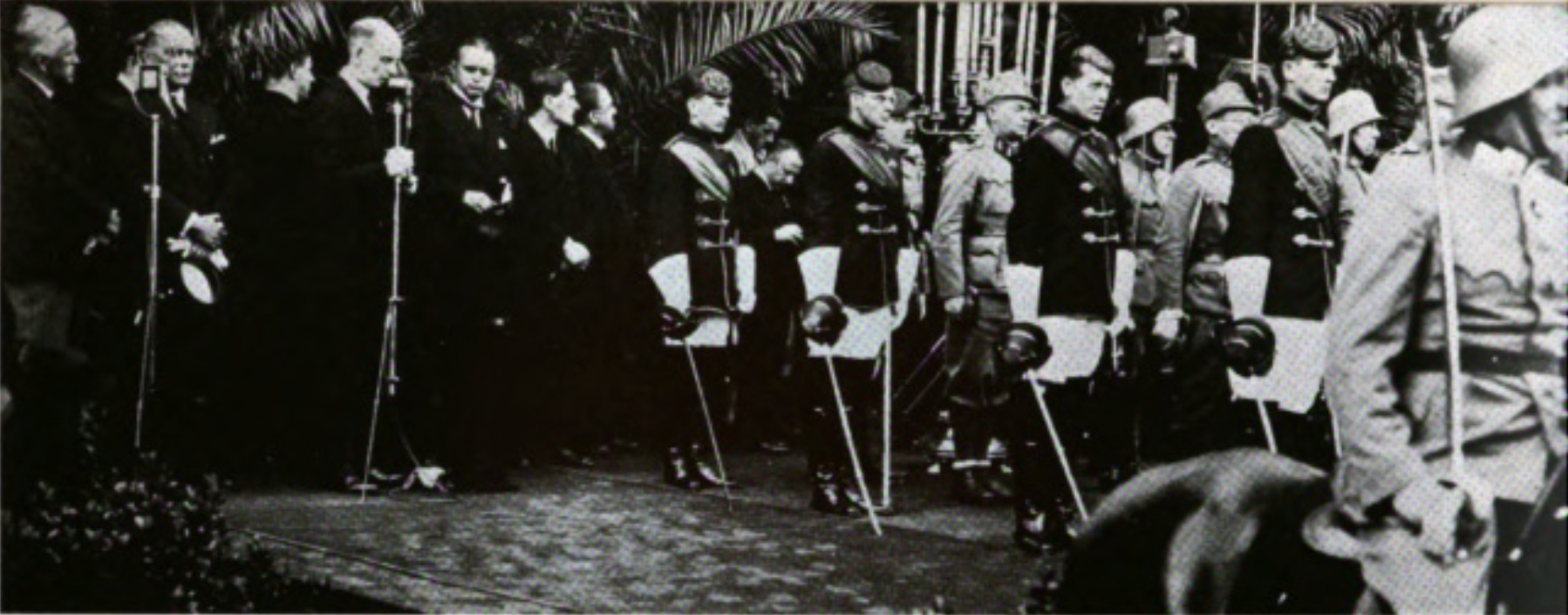
Max Jordan (holds microphone) reports for NBC radio from the funeral of Engelbert Dollfuss' funeral in Vienna, Austria, July, 1934.

In 1931, he became domiciled in Arlesheim, Canton of Basel-Landschaft. In 1939 he became a U.S. citizen.

He also hired Martin Agronsky in 1940 to cover the war.

Horten stated that part of Jordan's success was his networking with the governments of Germany, Austria, and Hungary, which provided NBC "privileged use" of their broadcasting facilities.

During the war, he worked on NBC's religious shows, which included prayers, bible stories, and a series about military Chaplainship, Chaplain Jim.

== Monk ==
Around 1954, he joined the Beuron Abbey, in Germany. He became a monk and took the name of Placid Jordan. He would later argue (in print) against Gordon Zahn's assertions that the Catholic Church had not properly resisted Nazism. Specifically, Jordan wrote responses to Zahn's papers regarding the Catholic Church and Nazi Germany. He also wrote a letter to William F. Buckley Jr.'s magazine National Review that was critical of Zahn's book German Catholics and Hitler's Wars.

Jordan died in 1977.

== See also ==
- Fred Bate
- Edward R Murrow
- William Shirer
- Karl H. von Wiegand
