= Universal News Service =

U.S.-based news agency

- Industry: News media, journalism
- Founded: July, 1918
- Fate: Merged with International News Service in August, 1937
- Successor: International News Service
- Headquarters: New York, N.Y., USA
- Key people: William Randolph Hearst; Moses Koenigsberg; Julian N. Gerard; George T. Hargreaves
- Products: Wire service

The Universal News Service (Universal Service) was a U.S.-based news agency (newswire) founded by newspaper publisher William Randolph Hearst in 1918.

The Universal News Service was originally established as Universal Service, Inc. to manage the night wire news operations of the International News Service. From the outset, Universal Service aimed to establish a team of renowned journalists and writers based in the United States and around the world. Among the first notable hires were Damon Runyon and Robert W. Ritchie.

In 1918, both the Universal News Service and the International News Service came under the management of King Features Syndicate, which was part of William R. Heart's media organizations and led by Moses Koenigsberg.

In August 1937, Universal Service was consolidated with the International News Service, thereafter operating on a 24-hour basis.

== History ==
The Universal News Service was established in July 1918, with Julian N. Gerard serving as its president. George T. Hargreaves, who had previously been the news manager for the International News Service, was appointed vice president and general manager. The agency's secretary and treasurer was W. M. Langdon. The Universal News Service was headquartered in the New York World Building.
