= Guido Enderis =

American journalist

Guido E. Enderis
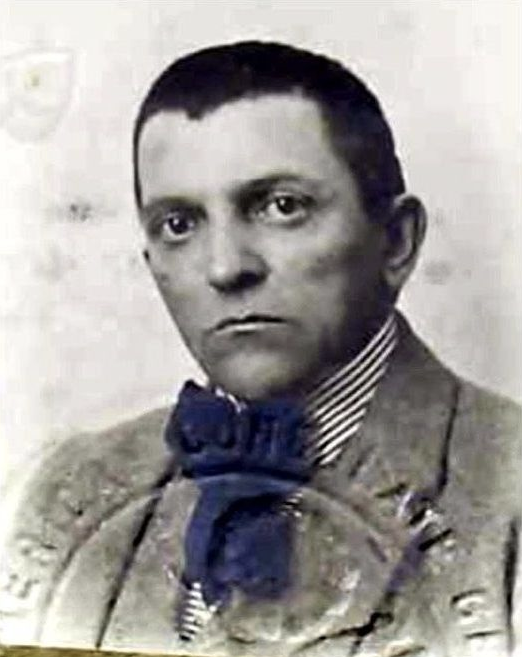
- Born: September 3, 1874; Chicago, Illinois, US
- Died: April 25, 1948 (aged 73); Milwaukee, Wisconsin, US
- Citizenship: US
- Occupation: journalist
- Employers: Milwaukee Free Press; Milwaukee Sentinel; Germania-Herald; Associated Press; The New York Times
- Known for: reporting from Germany (1914-1941)
- Relatives: Henry W. Enderis (brother); Dorothy Enderis (sister)

Guido Ernst Enderis (September 3, 1874 – April 25, 1948) was an American journalist and bureau chief for the Associated Press and The New York Times in Berlin. He was known for his sympathetic views toward fascism in Germany. As one of the longest-serving American foreign correspondents stationed in Berlin at the onset of the Second World War, Enderis's career spanned from his arrival in 1914 as a foreign correspondent for the Germania-Herold to his forced departure in 1941.

== Early life ==
Guido Enderis was born in Chicago to Swiss immigrant parents on September 3, 1874. He became interested in the newspaper business through his father, Henry, who worked for the Brumder publications in Milwaukee. Enderis’ brother, Henry W. Enderis, also joined the newspaper business and worked as a publisher for 20 years at the Lincoln Freie Press in Lincoln, Nebraska. Enderis started his career as a Milwaukee newspaperman. He worked at the old Milwaukee Free Press and also served on the Milwaukee Sentinel. In 1912, with Oscar H. Morris, another Milwaukee newspaperman, Enderis was the campaign manager for Lawrence McGreal (Lawrence McGreal was nominated for sheriff of Milwaukee County on the Democratic ticket at the Wisconsin primary elections held on September 3, 1912).

== Foreign correspondent in Berlin ==
=== First World War ===
In 1914, Enderis went to Europe and settled in Berlin as a foreign correspondent for the Germania-Herold (a morning and evening daily newspaper in German in Milwaukee). On February 9, 1917, Enderis was appointed the European correspondent of the Associated Press in Berlin and replaced its previous bureau chief S. B. Conger (head of the Berlin bureau from 1910 to 1917).

=== Interwar years ===
After the First World War, Enderis became one of the last correspondents to stay in the Adlon Hotel, which unofficially served as the headquarters for American and British correspondents. Eventually, he was promoted to chief of the Associated Press Berlin bureau. Enderis returned to the US for several months in 1926 and was assigned to the Associated Press Washington staff. He resigned from the Associated Press in autumn 1928. Enderis was replaced by his colleague Louis P. Lochner who stayed as a chief of the Associated Press Berlin bureau until his return to the US in 1942 after his five months' internment in Germany. According to Louis Lochner, Enderis was 'exceedingly tight-lipped about his personal affairs' and there was no explanation given about Enderis' departure from the Associated Press. Later Lochner learned that Enderis had serious disagreements with the senior management in New York.

In 1928–1929, Enderis became the head of The New York Times bureau in Berlin. In 1930s', the core of the Enderis' Berlin team of The New York Times included Frederick T. Birchall, Otto Tolischus, Robert Crozier Long and C. Brooks Peters.

=== Second World War ===
In 1941, as his colleagues departed and Otto Tolischus was expelled from Germany (April 1940), Enderis was left as the only representative of The New York Times still reporting from Berlin. After Hitler's declaration of war against the US, Enderis was the only American reporter in Berlin not rounded up for internment. In December 1941 Enderis was allowed to remain in his hotel because of a bronchial infection, though he was not allowed to continue reporting for The New York Times from Berlin. Later, Nazi authorities allowed Enderis to leave Berlin and depart to Switzerland.

== Later years ==
While in Bern, Switzerland, Enderis suffered a stroke and was brought back to the US in 1946. Enderis died at the age of 73 on April 25 in Milwaukee, Wisconsin, following a long illness. He died at the home of his sister, Dorothy C. Enderis (Dorothy Enderis was a famous continuing education and recreation pioneer in Milwaukee).

== Reputation and controversies ==
Enderis was known for his sympathetic views towards fascism in Germany. For instance, William L. Shirer noted his impressions of Enderis in his Berlin Diary (record from June 18, 1935):

‘Guido Enderis of The New York Times, aging in his sixties but sporting invariably a gaudy race-track suit with a loud red necktie, minding the Nazis less than most — a man who achieved the distinction once of working here as an American correspondent even after we got into the war.’

Journalism scholar Laurel Leff has noted that Enderis publicly defended Nazism, often appearing at the Adlon Hotel in Berlin “spouting ‘a loudmouthed defense of Nazism’,” which reportedly provoked concern among other Times correspondents. Leff also writes that throughout the 1930s, Enderis helped guide Times coverage to downplay Jewish persecution and emphasize Germany’s peaceful intentions, while kowtowing to Nazi officials and constraining more critical reporting by other journalists.
