= Upton Close =

American foreign correspondent and radio host

- Close in the 1920s
- Born: Josef Washington Hall; February 27, 1894; Kelso, Washington, United States
- Died: October 13, 1960 (aged 66); Guadalajara, Jalisco, Mexico
- Occupations: News correspondent, radio commentator, writer, columnist
- Employer(s): National Broadcasting Company, Mutual Broadcasting System
- Children: 5 sons

Josef Washington Hall (27 February 1894 – 13 November 1960), popularly known as Upton Close, was an American foreign correspondent and radio commentator specializing in the Far East. His radio career on NBC began in 1934 when he was seen as an objective commentator who had liberal beliefs, before a rightward turn in the 1940s culminating in his dismissal in November 1944, which he alleged was the result of a conspiracy.

Close wrote several nonfiction books about East Asia which often included his adventures there, for which the Chicago Tribune once called him "the Marco Polo of news commentators".

== Early life ==
Close was born on 27 February 1895 in an Indian reservation near Kelso, Washington. The son of a prominent pioneer, Close was educated at Washington Missionary College and received his B.A. at George Washington University. In 1915, he married the first of his five wives. Close was fluent in Chinese.

== Foreign correspondent and professor ==
In 1916, he led the espionage arm of the American legation in Beijing, embedded in Shandong amid the Japanese occupation there. In China he also worked as the foreign affairs chief to warlord Wu Peifu, an advisor to Chinese student revolutionaries, and briefly editor of The Peking Leader. His contributions to the Shanghai Weekly Review concluded with "Up Close", indicating his proximity to action. The editor ran his sign off as his name, and the name Upton Close stuck. He remained in Asia as a newspaper correspondent for the Far East until 1922, when he caught typhoid fever and then returned to America.

Close in 1927

Throughout his career he contributed thousands of articles and columns to newspapers and magazines, including The New York Times, The Saturday Evening Post, and the San Francisco Examiner. His commentary at the time was considered that of an internationalist liberal. He became professor of Asiatic Culture at the University of Washington and returned to Asia in 1926 as leader of a company of students and faculty. There, the group saw famines, floods, and traveled in China, India, Russia, the Middle East, and Europe. Close collapsed with dengue fever in Hong Kong, was briefly thrown into a military prison, and twice reported dead in the press.

== Radio commentator ==
Close first appeared on the radio in 1924 with Lowell Thomas at the University of Washington.

=== NBC ===
From 1934 to April 1941, Close appeared on NBC only sporadically. From 1941 to September 1942 he was made the channel's special expert on Pacific affairs, appearing each Sunday for his block called Events and Trends of the Week. His commentary was considered to be generally neutral. His widely-listened to broadcast following Pearl Harbor speculated that it was a German agent-influenced coup not endorsed by the Japanese government. In September 1942 he began Close Ups of the News, sponsored by Northern Pump and Sheaffer Pen Company. Over the next two years, as he reached the peak of his popularity, beginning after the passage of the Renegotiation Act of 1942, he became more opposed to the foreign policy of the Roosevelt administration, British interests, and cooperation with the Soviet Union. He advocated returning home the troops as soon as the war ended, voiced belief that Japan was receiving some American lend-Lease via the Soviets, supported the war against Japan over the one against Germany, and asserted that Truman had connections to the Ku Klux Klan. He had a Hooper Rating between 4.7 and 6.3.

He was accused of opposing war against Germany and being pro-German, an isolationist, anti-labor, and antisemitic. He offered a 1,000 dollar war bond for anyone who could show his writings or broadcasts to be such, which he never awarded, probably because he was apparently the judge of the matter.

In October 1944, Close received notice that he would be dropped by NBC. He was dropped for his defense of Tyler Kent, who he argued should have received a trial in the United States. He also speculated on the death of a friend of Kent and if he was murdered in a conspiracy. Close's show would end in December, and he was replaced by Max Hill. He complained that his dismissal was part of the silencing of opposition voices, like that of Henry J. Taylor and the deceased Boake Carter. He also blamed a boycott of Sheaffer pens and pressure from communists and radicals, the latter charge NBC president Niles Trammell denied.

=== MBS ===
Congressman Roy Woodruff came to the political aid of Close, and he received financial support from National Economic Council, Inc. in 1946 for his broadcasts on Mutual Broadcasting System (MBS). By August 1946, he had an audience of 8 million. He continued to move further to the right on MBS. He complained about his station, WOR, censoring him at, as he said, the behest of their owner, Macy's, for anti-Soviet materials. He also complained about what he described as the Anti-Defamation League's attempt at using law enforcement against him. He would eventually quit MBS and retire.

== Activism ==
Close spoke at Chicago Citizens U.S.A., the Committee for Negotiated Peace, and in 1944 a Republican rally in Evanston, Illinois. Close sought to combat alleged socialist infiltration in churches, academia, unions, and the Truman administration with local monitoring committees. He helped found American Action, Inc. alongside John T. Flynn, Samuel Pettengill, and George Robnett, which was intended to combat the Congress of Industrial Organizations. Copies of his broadcasts were distributed by We, the Mothers, Mobilize for America, the Peace Now Movement, and by supporters of nationalist Gerald L. K. Smith. Close supported a Douglas Macarthur presidency and argued on MBS that the United Nations was a socialist plot. He supported capitalism as humanity's liberalizing force.

== Retirement and death ==
Close retired in 1952 and moved to Guadalajara, Mexico. He lived on and off there and was killed when his car was struck by a train there on 13 November 1960.

== Bibliography ==
Close wrote these books:

- In the Land of the Laughing Buddha (1925)
- Outline History of China, co-authored by H.H. Gowen (1926)
- The Revolt of Asia (1927)
- Moonlady (1927)
- Eminent Asians (1929)
- Challenge (1934), republished as Behind the Face of Japan (1942)
- The Ladder of History, co-authored by Merle Burke (1945)
