= Robert Lochner =

American journalist

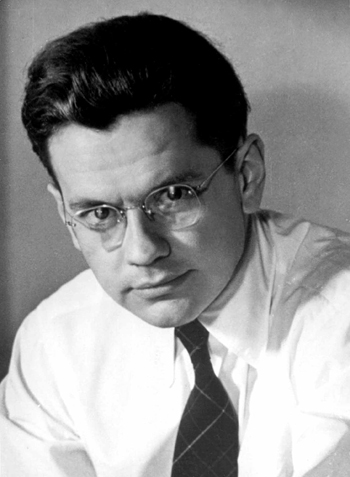
U.S. diplomat Robert Lochner

Robert H. Lochner (October 20, 1918 – September 21, 2003) was a journalist who helped to revive the free media in West Germany after World War II and who is most well known for assisting John F. Kennedy with his famous "Ich bin ein Berliner" speech in 1963.

== Early life ==
Born in New York City on October 20, 1918, to Louis and Emmy Lochner (née Hoyer), Lochner grew up in Berlin.

== Education ==
Lochner studied one semester at the University of Berlin, and then took a B.A. and an M.A. in Political Science and Economics at the University of Chicago and remained in the U.S.

== Career ==
Lochner worked for NBC during World War II, and returned to Germany as a U.S. soldier in 1945. His firm knowledge of the German language enabled him to become chief interpreter for the US occupation forces in Western Germany, until he took a position as chief editor of the Neue Zeitung newspaper in Frankfurt in 1949.

Lochner also was head of the Rundfunk im amerikanischen Sektor (RIAS, English: Broadcasting in the American sector), a radio station supported by the US government in West Berlin during Kennedy's visit to West Germany. Lochner famously acted as Kennedy's interpreter, helping the president practice his speech on June 26, 1963, and the key phrase "Ich bin ein Berliner" ("I am a Berliner"), for which he created the phonetic spelling "ish bin ein bear-lee-ner".

Later in his life, Lochner worked in Vietnam and Washington before retiring in Berlin. He died from a pulmonary embolism on September 21, 2003, and left three daughters and a son.

== Distinctions ==
- Große Bundesverdienstkreuz
- 1993: Verdienstorden des Landes Berlin
- Freiheitsglocke in Silver
- Lucius D. Clay Medal
- Gold Medal of the Munich Marionet Theater
