= Pierre J. Huss =

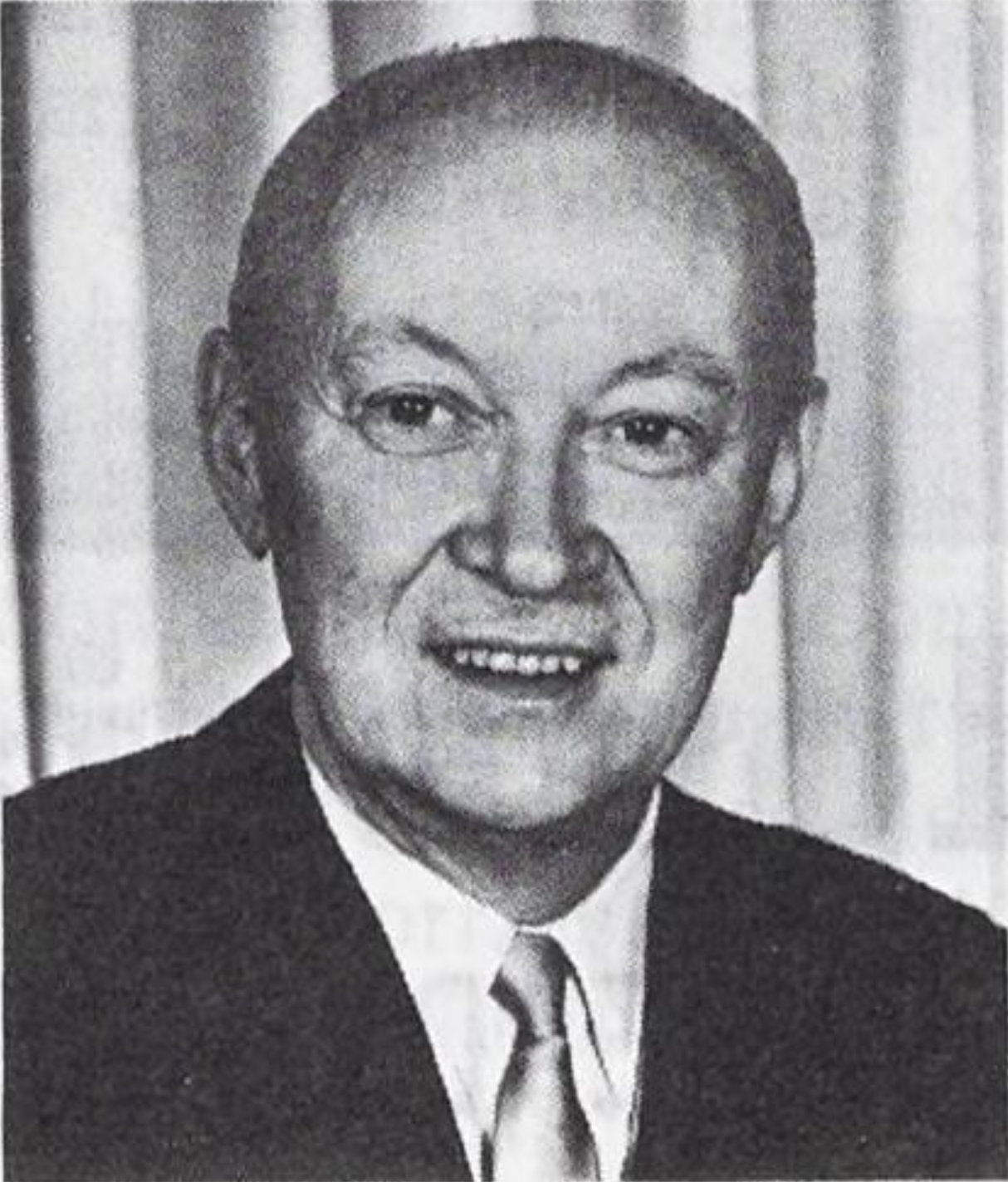
- Pierre J. Huss
- Born: May 1, 1901; Luxembourg
- Died: March 22, 1966 (aged 64); New York City, U.S.
- Occupations: journalist, foreign correspondent
- Employers: International News Service; Hearst Headline Service
- Known for: reporting from Nazi Germany
- Notable work: Heil! And Farewell: The Foe We Face (1942)
- Spouse: Marianne Huss
- Children: Marie-Anne and Jacqueline
- Awards: National Headliner Award (1942); Sigma Delta Chi Award (1958)

Pierre John Huss (1 May 1901 – 22 March 1966 ) was a journalist and author, best known as a war correspondent during World War II.

Huss was for many years chief International News Service (INS) correspondent in Berlin. He was part of an overseas reporting staff assembled by Edward R. Murrow in March 1938 for what was the first in what became the daily CBS World News Roundup broadcasts.

He interviewed Adolf Hitler multiple times during the 1930s and 1940s, and wrote Heil! And Farewell: The Foe We Face in 1942, the same year he won a National Headliner Award.

Huss was president of the United Nations Correspondents Association in 1962. He and George Carpozi, Jr. cowrote Red Spies in the UN, published in 1965.

In 1958 Huss received the Sigma Delta Chi award for general reporting for his work on a UN report of the Hungarian Revolution.

Huss died of a heart attack on March 22, 1966, after collapsing in the lobby of the United Nations, where he was then a reporter for the Hearst Headline Service. He was survived by his wife Marianne and daughters Marie-Anne and Jacqueline.

== Example of his reporting ==
As an INS correspondent based at the Allied Forces Headquarters in North Africa, Huss wrote the following in July 1943, after news of Mussolini's fall from power:

The battle spirit of Allied Forces in Sicily soared today at news of Premier Mussolini's resignation. The immediate consequences of Mussolini's fall, after 20 years of dictatorship, undoubtedly will be a nosedive in the morale of Italian fighting forces.
Everything points to the fact that Mussolini lately saw the handwriting on the wall and that, in desperation, he laid his case before Hitler last Monday [July 19] after sensing the growing hostility toward him and Fascism on the part of the Italian people and the crown.
But Hitler, unlike Il Duce, probably will ride the storm to the bitter end, wildly spilling oceans of blood in occupied countries and even in the Reich itself, and kill himself rather than follow Mussolini's example and resign.
