= Michael Friedrich Lochner =

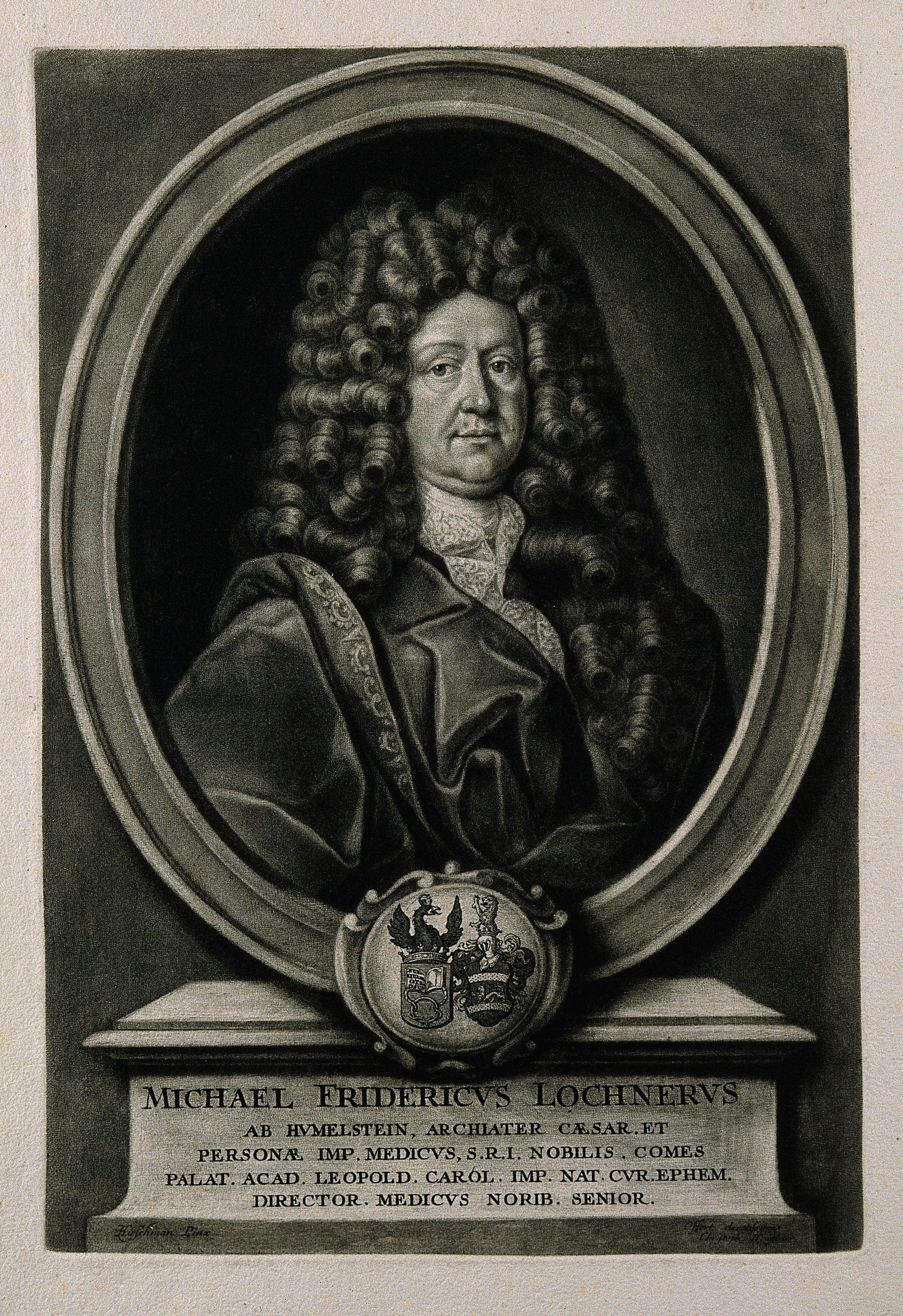

Michael Friedrich Lochner later von Hummelstein (28 February 1662 – 15 October 1720) was a German physician who served as city-physician for Nuremberg who was also a naturalist writing mainly on botanical topics.

== Biography ==
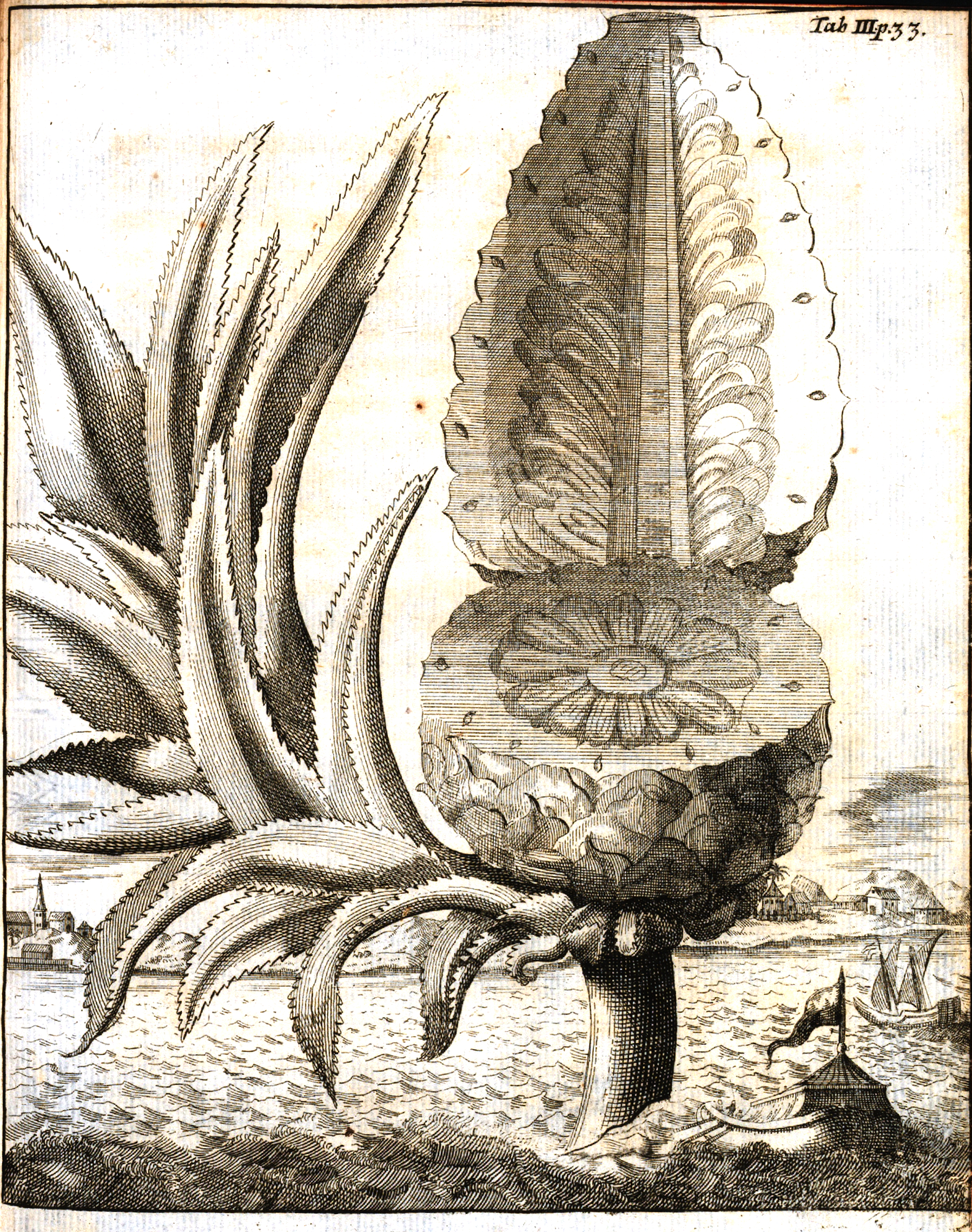
Illustration of pineapple from 1716

Lochner was born in Fürth, the son of a priest Carl Friedrich Lochner, and was educated at grammar school in Nuremberg and Wismar before going to the Universities of Rostock, Kiel and Altdorf. His dissertation under Johann Moritz Hoffmann in 1682 was titled De Faciei Promontorio, Odoratus Organo. He then worked in Paris and Vienna and returned to Altdorf in 1684. His inaugural disputatio was titled Historiam medicam de Nymphomania and dealt with nymphomania. He visited Europe again to gain medical knowledge, travelling through Vienna, Venice and Padua and became a member of the Nuremberg college of medicine. He succeeded Johann Paul Wurfbain as city physician for Nuremberg. In 1686 he was made a member of the Leopoldina academy under the pseudonym Periander. He wrote several works on botany including on pineapples. He married Anna Maria née Vierzigmann and they had a son Johann Heinrich Lochner von Hummelstein, and a daughter. His son-in-law was the physician Christoph Ludwig Göckel. He died in Nürnberg.
