= Moses Koenigsberg =

American journalist (1879–1945)

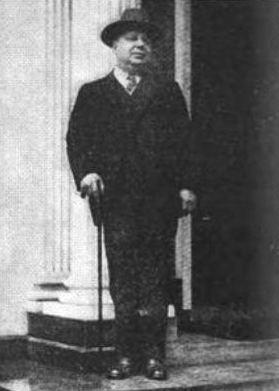
- Born: April 16, 1879; New Orleans, Louisiana, U.S.
- Died: September 21, 1945 (aged 66); New York City, U.S.
- Occupations: Journalist, journalism executive
- Employer: Hearst Communications (1916–1928)
- Known for: King Features Syndicate
- Spouse: Virginia V. Carter
- Children: 1

Moses Koenigsberg (/ˈkoʊnɪɡzbɜːrɡ/; April 16, 1879 – September 21, 1945) was an executive for William Randolph Hearst, and ran King Features Syndicate. Comic strips, features, and news supervised by Koenigsberg appeared in newspapers having a mass circulation of 16,000,000 readers on weekdays and 25,000,000 on Sundays.

== Early life and career ==
He was born in New Orleans, Louisiana, and his career began at the age of nine when he published a monthly newspaper, The Amateur. When he was 13, he won $100 in a Chamber of Commerce essay competition and began reporting for the San Antonio Times. He lost that job when he was sued for exposing corruption among prosecuting attorneys, who were taking fines from prostitutes. The suit was dropped, and he moved to Houston to continue his newspaper career as a reporter with the Houston Age and as an editor of Texas World. Relocating in New Orleans, he signed on as a reporter for the New Orleans Item. Back in San Antonio, he launched the Evening Star in 1892. He continued on with newspapers in Kansas City, St. Louis, Chicago, Pittsburgh and New York.

During the Spanish American War, he served with an Alabama volunteer unit and with the First Division of the Seventh Army Corps in Miami. His book, Southern Martyrs (1898), is about military censorship during that war.

In 1903, he became city editor of Hearst's Chicago American. In 1913, Koenigsberg headed a Hearst subsidiary, Newspaper Feature Service, Inc., to sell Hearst's features and comics to non-Hearst papers.

== King Features Syndicate ==
In 1915 King Features Syndicate was launched when Koenigsberg consolidated all of Hearst's syndication enterprises under one banner and gave it his own name (koenig meaning 'king').

By 1928, Koenigsberg was the president of International News Service, Universal Service, King Features Syndicate, Premier Syndicate and vice-president of Newspaper Feature Service, all owned by Hearst.

For nine years, Koenigsberg also staged the King Features Syndicates Larks, elaborate annual Friars Club dinner parties with a six-hour theatrical involving Broadway luminaries. The total expense of each show ran from $14,000 to $25,000. Guests received unusual souvenirs at these events, such as a glass container of liquor inside a walking stick.

== Death ==
Koenigsberg was 66 when he died in New York of a heart attack at his home at 160 Riverside Drive.

== Bibliography ==
- Southern Martyrs (1898)
- The Elk and the Elephant (1899)
- King News: An Autobiography (Frederick A. Stokes Co., 1941)
