= Max Hill (journalist) =

American journalist and radio broadcaster (1904–1949)

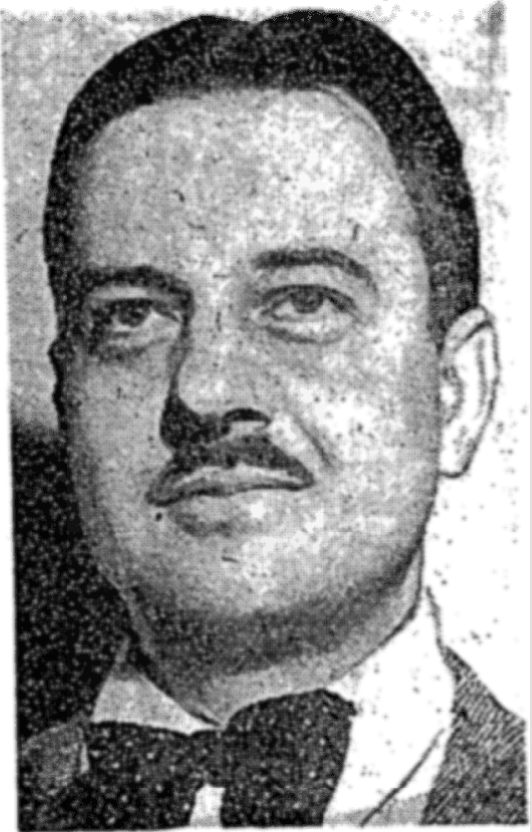
- Born: April 23, 1904; Colorado Springs, Colorado, U.S.A.
- Died: October 17, 1949 (aged 45); Elkhart, Indiana, U.S.A.
- Education: University of Colorado
- Occupations: journalist, radio broadcaster, author
- Known for: Exchange Ship (1942)
- Children: June Hill

Max Hill (April 23, 1904 – October 17, 1949) was an American journalist and radio broadcaster. He is best known for his work at the Associated Press and NBC; also, for his book Exchange Ship, narrating his and his fellow journalists' imprisonment and internment in Tokyo, Japan during World War II.

== Early life ==
Max Hill was born in Colorado Springs, Colorado. He graduated from the University of Colorado in 1926 and worked for several years for the Denver Post, where he became city editor in 1932.

== Career ==
Hill joined the Associated Press in 1934 and worked in the New York and Washington bureaus. He was promoted to head of the New York bureau in 1938.

In 1940 Hill was made chief of the Associated Press Tokyo bureau. He was there when the Japanese attacked Pearl Harbor on December 7, 1941. He was imprisoned and interned by the Japanese authorities until June 1942. Hill returned to the U.S. aboard an exchange ship, the MS Gripsholm. This trip was the basis for his book Exchange Ship.

After his return to the United States, Hill joined NBC in 1943 and for two years covered World War II in North Africa, Italy, Turkey, and Greece. Later, he served as a radio news commentator replacing Upton Close in 1944.

== Personal life ==
Hill was married to June Hill and they had a daughter, June. In 1946, June Hill committed suicide by falling to her death from the bedroom of her apartment on the seventh floor at 340 East Fifty-second Street in New York City. According to June Hill's neighbours, she had been ill for a few months before her death.

At the time of Max Hill's death, he was married to Phoebe Hill.

== Death ==
Max Hill died on October 17, 1949, in Elkhart, Indiana. At the time of his death, he was working as an official for the Wade Advertising Agency in Chicago. He was found dead in his bed at the Elkhart Hotel. The Elkhart County coroner's report stated that Hill died of acute coronary occlusion.
