= International News Service =

U.S.-based news agency

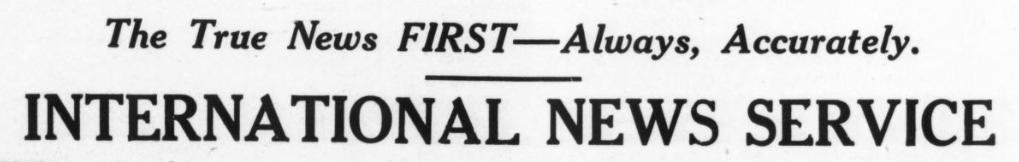
- Industry: News media, journalism
- Founded: May 1909 (as American News Service); January 1910 (as International News Service)
- Fate: Merged with United Press May 1958
- Successor: United Press
- Headquarters: New York City, US
- Key people: William Randolph Hearst; Moses Koenigsberg; E. Barry Faris
- Products: Wire service

The International News Service (INS) was a U.S.-based news agency (newswire) founded by newspaper publisher William Randolph Hearst in 1909.

The INS consistently ranked as the third-largest news agency in the U.S., trailing behind its major competitors, the Associated Press and United Press. Despite notable achievements and considerable investments, the INS never managed to surpass its rivals. At its peak, the INS served 19 percent of American daily newspapers (1948). In May 1958 it merged with rival United Press to become United Press International.

== History ==
=== Hearst News Service ===
The precursor to the International News Service was the Hearst News Service, which was established in 1904. In 1903, the Hearst publishing organization leased a telegraph line from San Francisco to New York, passing through Chicago, to facilitate its expanding newspaper business in these three cities and to share reporting. This service also provided news items to other newspapers, leading to the formation of the Hearst News Service.

=== International News Service ===
In May 1909, the Hearst publishing organization established the American News Service (ANS), headquartered in New York. The American News Service was formed to sell Hearst's wire reports to outside morning papers in the United States. Curtis J. Mar was appointed the first president and general manager of the ANS, succeeded the same year by Richard A. Farrelly. The service was expanded to include foreign news reporting from August 1909.

Shortly after its establishment, the American News Service was split into two divisions to cater to morning and evening newspapers across the United States. In order to reflect its widened news field which now included reporting of the domestic and foreign news, the American News Service was renamed the International News Service (INS) in January 1910. The INS was responsible for providing overnight reports to morning newspapers seven days a week. At the same time, Hearst established the National News Association (NNA) to provide six day a week news report for evening newspapers.

In 1911, the National News Association was dissolved: ultimately, the morning and evening services were integrated and operated under the INS banner.

In 1916, E. Barry Faris joined the INS as a correspondent and news manager in Washington, D.C. Consequently, E. Barry Faris stayed with the INS for the next forty years and became one of the key figures in the organization: he served as an assistant to editorial managers Marlen E. Pew and George G. Shor. In 1927 E. Barry Faris was promoted to general news manager and in 1932 became the editor of the INS, a position he held until the INS and United Press were merged in 1958.

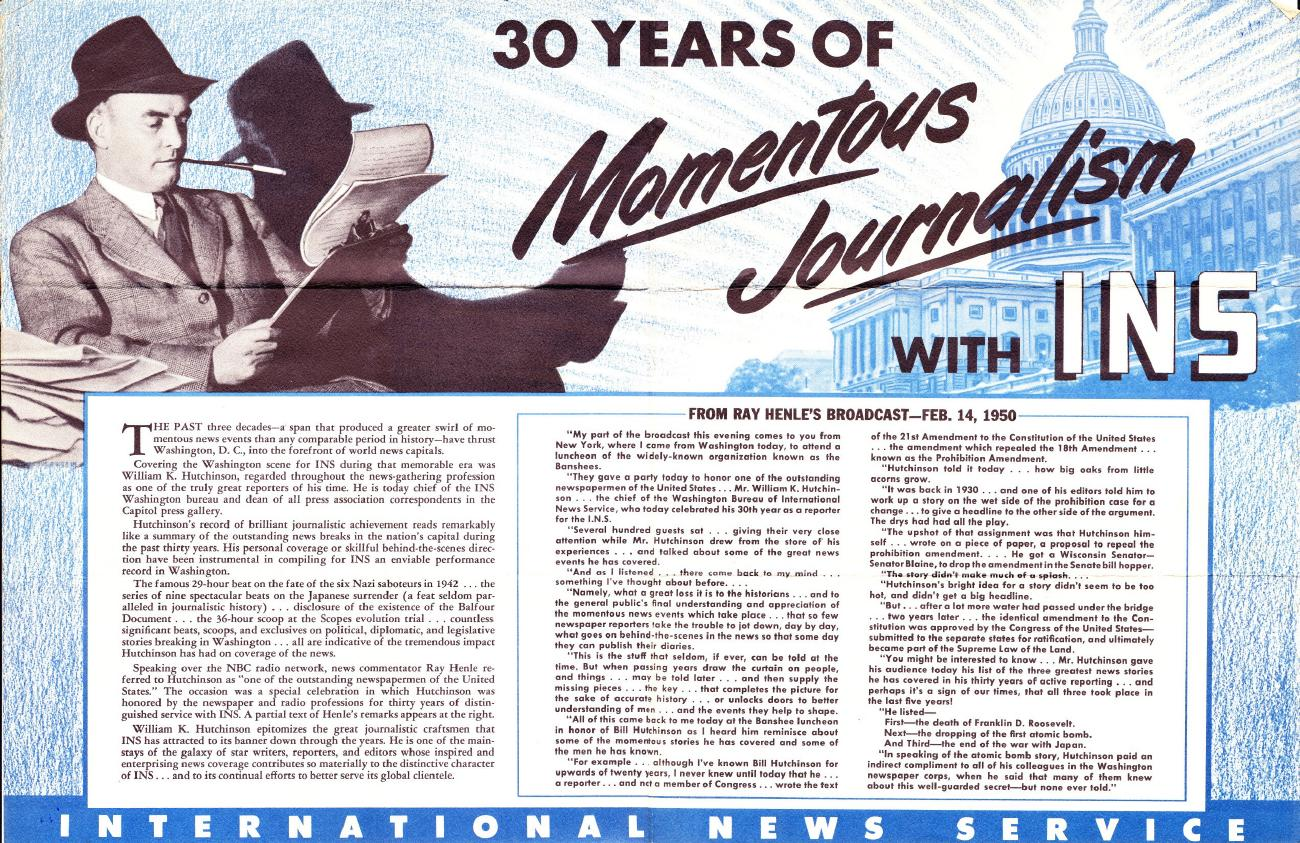
The INS press release (February 14, 1950): "30 Years of Momentous Journalism with INS"

Established two years after Hearst-competitor E.W. Scripps combined three smaller syndicates under his control into United Press Associations, INS battled the other major newswires. It added a picture service, International News Photos, or INP. The Hearst newsreel series Hearst Metrotone News (1914–1967) was released as International Newsreel from January 1919 to July 1929. Universal Service, another Hearst-owned news agency, merged with International News Service in 1937. Always a distant third to its larger rivals the Associated Press and the United Press, the INS was merged with UP on May 24, 1958, to become UPI.

New York City's all-news radio station, WINS, then under Hearst ownership, took its call letters from INS, as did the short-lived (1948–49), DuMont Television Network nightly newscast, I.N.S. Telenews.

=== Notable employees and contributors ===
Among those who worked for INS were future broadcasters William Shirer, Edwin Newman, Bob Clark, Freeman Fulbright, and Irving R. Levine, who in 1950 covered the outbreak of war in Korea for INS. Marion Carpenter, the first woman national press photographer to cover Washington, D.C., and the White House, and to travel with a US president, also had worked for the INS. The INS also counted among its ranks other famous journalists, including Jack Lait, Damon Runyon, Karl Henry von Wiegand, Otto D. Tolischus, Dorothy Thompson, Hubert Renfro Knickerbocker, Pierre J. Huss, Richard Tregaskis, Max Jordan.

== International News Service v. Associated Press ==
During the early years of World War I, Hearst's INS was barred from using Allied telegraph lines, because of reporting of British losses. INS made do by allegedly taking news stories off AP bulletin boards, rewriting them and selling them to other outlets. AP sued INS and the case reached the United States Supreme Court.

The case was considered important in terms of distinguishing between upholding the common law rule of "no copyright in facts", and applying the common law doctrine of misappropriation through the tort of unfair competition. In International News Service v. Associated Press of 1918, Justice Mahlon Pitney wrote for the majority in ruling that INS was infringing on AP's "lead-time protection", and defining it as an unfair business practice. Pitney narrowed the period for which the newly defined proprietary right would apply: this doctrine "postpones participation by complainant's competitor in the processes of distribution and reproduction of news that it has not gathered, and only to the extent necessary to prevent that competitor from reaping the fruits of complainant's efforts and expenditure." Justice Louis D. Brandeis wrote a minority opinion, objecting to the court's creating a new private property right.

== INS Poll ==
Between 1952 and 1957, members of the International News Service conducted an annual college football poll, similar to those held by rivals at the Associated Press (AP Poll) and United Press (Coaches Poll). Every week during the football season, a group of experts and writers issues a list of the top 10 teams of that week, culminating in a national champion awarded at the end of the season, before the bowl games. The poll ceased after INS merged with UP in 1958.

Season	INS National Champion
1952	Georgia Tech
1953	Maryland
1954	Ohio State
1955	Oklahoma
1956	Oklahoma
1957	Ohio State
