= Louis P. Lochner =

American political activist, journalist and author (1887–1975)

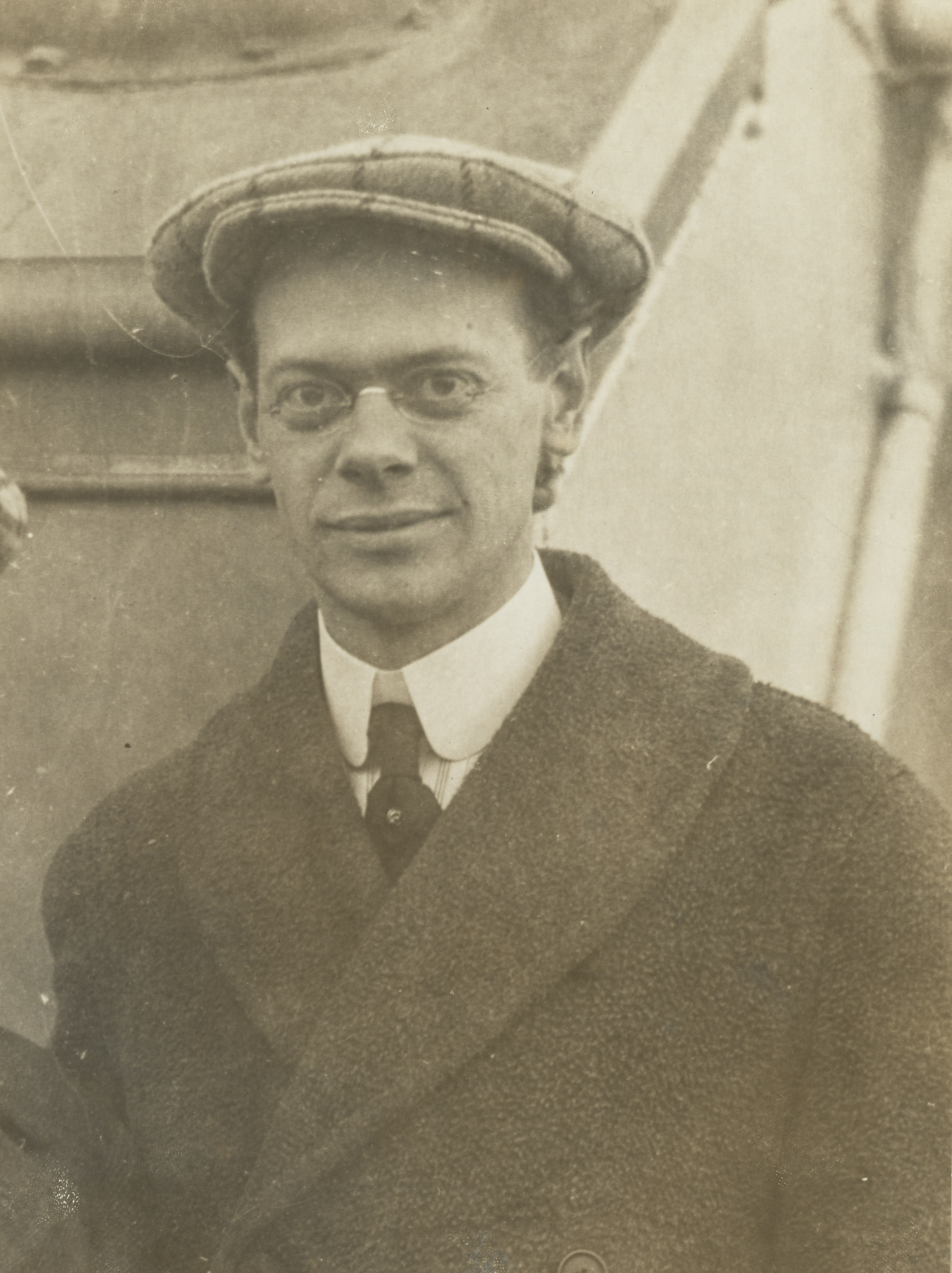
- Lochner, c. 1918
- Born: February 22, 1887; Springfield, Illinois, US
- Died: January 8, 1975 (aged 87); Wiesbaden, West Germany
- Education: Wisconsin Conservatory of Music; University of Wisconsin
- Occupations: Journalist, bureau chief
- Employers: Milwaukee Free Press; Federated Press; Associated Press
- Notable work: What About Germany? (1942)
- Spouses: Emmy Hoyer (m. 1910; died 1920) Hilde De Terra Steinberger (m. 1922)
- Children: 3, including Robert
- Awards: Pulitzer Prize for Correspondence for dispatches from Nazi Germany (1939)

Ludwig "Louis" Paul Lochner (February 22, 1887 – January 8, 1975) was an American political activist, journalist, and author. During World War I, Lochner was a leading figure in the American and the international anti-war movement. Later, he served for many years as head of the Berlin bureau of Associated Press and was best remembered for his work there as a foreign correspondent.

Lochner was awarded the 1939 Pulitzer Prize for correspondence for his wartime reporting from Nazi Germany. In December 1941, Lochner was interned by the Nazis but was later released in a prisoner exchange.

== Early life ==
=== Family ===
Louis Lochner was born February 22, 1887, in Springfield, Illinois, to Johann Friedrich Karl Lochner and Maria Lochner née von Haugwitz. The senior Lochner was a Lutheran minister. Lochner's father, Friedrich Lochner, emigrated to the United States in 1845 and assumed a position in the Lutheran pastorate in Toledo, Ohio. In 1849, Friedrich was joined by his father, along with his wife and three younger children. The Lochner paternal lineage had been residents of Nuremberg since at least the fifteenth century, with a comprehensive account of this branch documented in the family history of "Nürnbergisches Lexicon", authored by Lochner's great-grandfather. Lochner's mother, Maria, came from the old Silesian noble family, von Haugwitz. Notably, Count Christian von Haugwitz, a member of this family, served as the foreign minister for king Frederick William II of Prussia.

Shortly before his mother's death, seven years old Lochner was taken into the care of his half-sister Amalia (Molly) and her husband, John C. Bruening. Following his mother's death, John and Molly relocated the family to Milwaukee, where John had accepted a position at the parochial school of Nazareth Lutheran Church.

=== Education ===
Lochner attended West Division High School. He studied piano and graduated from the Wisconsin Conservatory of Music in June 1905. Following his graduation, he chose to further his education at the University of Wisconsin at Madison. During his first year at the university, Lochner was determined to secure a Rhodes Scholarship to study at Oxford University. However, he did not win the scholarship in 1906. It was during this period that Lochner enrolled in one of the first journalism courses offered by American universities. Encouraged by professor Willard G. Bleyer, he sought summer employment in journalism and, in 1908, applied for a cub reporter position at the Milwaukee Free Press. He was interviewed and subsequently hired by the city editor, Malcolm C. Douglas.

Lochner's interest in journalism persisted beyond his tenure at the Free Press. In his senior year (1908-1909), he helped to found the Wisconsin Spectator, a monthly student opinion publication. Edgar E. Robinson served as the editor-in-chief, while Lochner took on the role of managing editor.

According to Lochner, his extracurricular activities at university were incredibly important for his future professional development. During his university years, Lochner joined the Philomathia Debating Society, where he was mentored by Eugene J. Marshall, the winner of the 1909 Hamilton Club Oratorical Contest in Chicago. Lochner credits Marshall's mentoring with helping him overcome his fears of public speaking.

Lochner also became a member of the Cosmopolitan Club and the International Club. He edited the Cosmopolitan Annual, which was later expanded into the monthly publication Cosmopolitan Student. In 1907, Lochner was elected secretary of the local International Club and organized the convention of International and Cosmopolitan Clubs that same year. In 1908, he became the first president of the Association of Cosmopolitan Clubs.

Lochner graduated Phi Beta Kappa in earning a bachelor's degree in 1909.

After graduation, Lochner continued to pursue his interests in international relations and journalism. In addition to earning a monthly income of $80 as an Alumni Fellow in Journalism, he received a monthly grant of $100 from the World Peace Foundation in Boston in 1909. Lochner served as a delegate of his local Association of Cosmopolitan Clubs to the international student congresses held in The Hague in 1909 and in Rome in 1911.

=== Marriages ===
On September 7, 1910, he married Emmy Hoyer; they had two children: Elsbeth and Robert. Hoyer died in 1920.

Lochner married again in 1922, his second wife being Hilde De Terra, née Steinberger, who brought Rosemarie De Terra, her daughter from her first marriage, into the family.

== Political activism ==
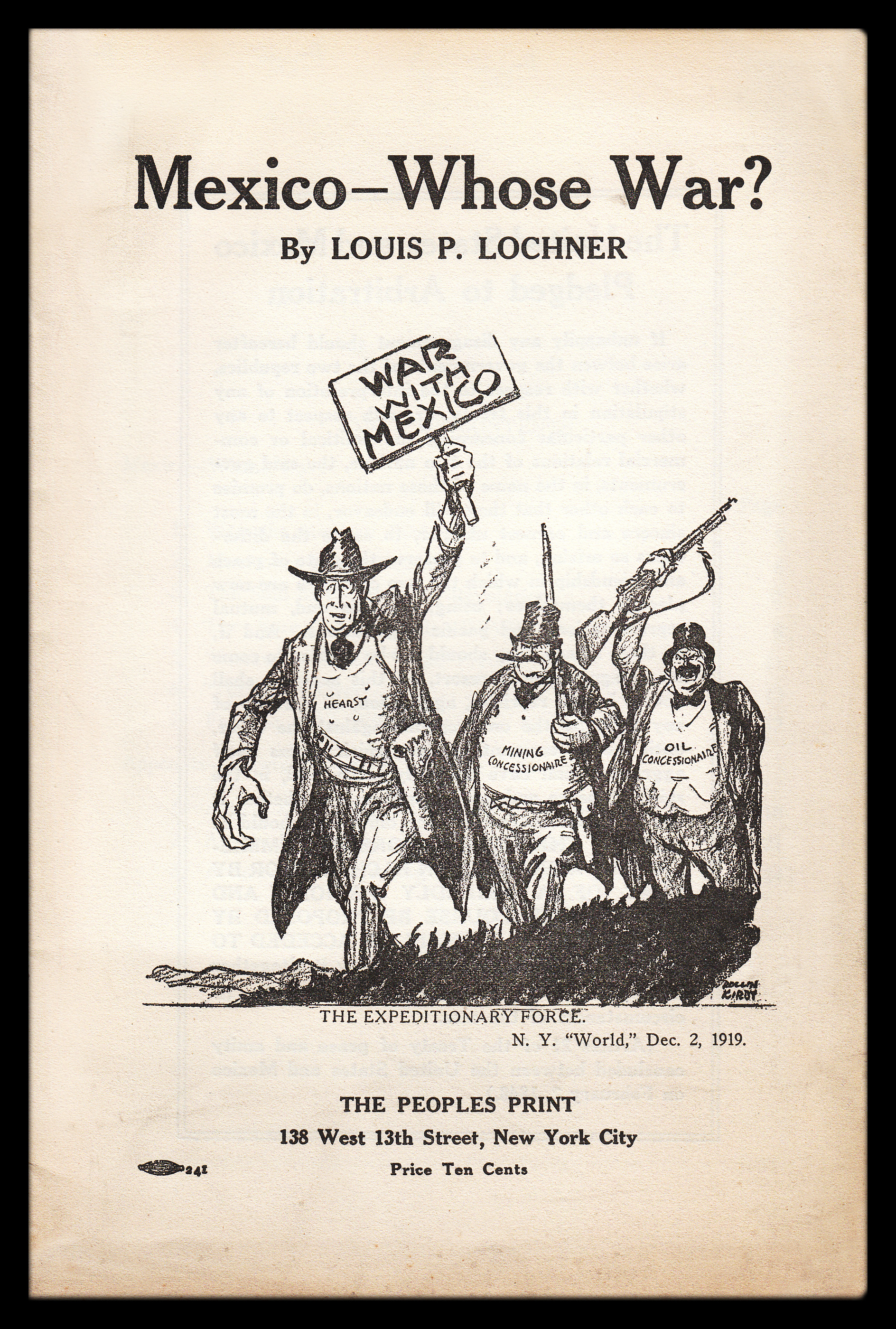
Cover of a Lochner pamphlet published at the end of 1919 by the People's Freedom Union in New York.

During the second decade of the 20th century, Lochner was a leading activist in the American pacifist movement. In late 1914, he was appointed Executive Director of the Chicago-based Emergency Peace Federation and worked closely with social activist Jane Addams in an attempt to call an international conference of neutral nations to mediate an end to World War I. Lochner, Addams, and their Emergency Peace Federation were instrumental in convening a national conference in Chicago in February 1915 that brought together delegates representing pacifist, religious, and anti-militarist political organizations from around the United States.

Lochner became a secretary to Henry Ford in 1915. He served as the head of publicity for Ford's ill-fated Peace Ship and he was the general secretary of the Ford-funded Neutral Conference for Continuous Mediation.

== Journalist ==
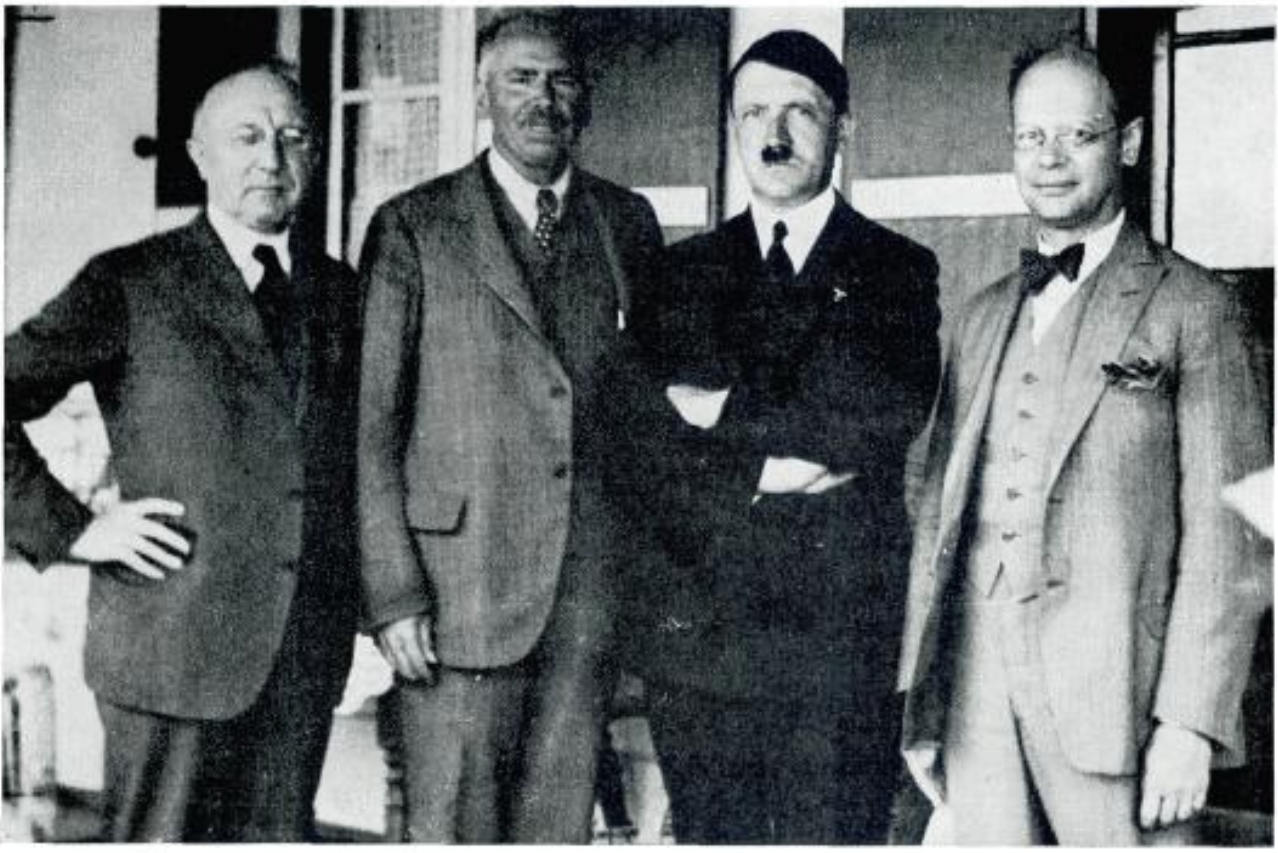
From left to right: American journalists Karl Henry Von Wiegand (Hearst), Hans V. Kaltenborn (CBS), Adolf Hitler, and Louis P. Lochner (AP) at Obersalzberg, August 17, 1932

After the end of the war in 1918, Lochner moved to Milwaukee, Wisconsin, to join the staff of the Milwaukee Free Press. He also edited for the International Labor News Service, a press agency of the day.

=== Federated Press ===
Lochner arrived in Germany in January 1921, following the death of his wife due to the Great Influenza epidemic in 1920. His relocation to Germany was part of an assignment by the news service of the Federated Press. According to Lochner, he faced financial difficulties from January 1921 to May 1924. At that time the base of his work was in Berlin. The introduction of the rentenmark, the new German currency, stabilized the hyperinflation, which consequently worsened Lochner's financial situation. Lochner realized that he could no longer support himself and his family on the salary provided by the Federated Press.

=== Associated Press ===
In April 1924, Lochner, along with other representatives of the American press, visited the S.S. Columbus in Bremerhaven. During this visit, Lochner introduced himself to Charles Stephenson Smith, the head of the Berlin Associated Press. Lochner expressed his willingness to join the American news service and hoped his candidacy would be considered in the event of a vacancy. To his immense surprise, a couple days later, Lochner received a telephone call from Smith, who offered him a position in the Berlin bureau of the Associated Press. Lochner joined immediately, becoming the fourth member of the Berlin team, which also included Charles Stephenson Smith, Guido Enderis, and James Howe.

In 1928, Lochner was promoted to the Berlin Bureau Chief to replace Guido Enderis. He stayed in this role until his internment in 1941. Lochner interviewed Adolf Hitler twice: first in 1930 and then in 1933.

When the German invasion of Poland in 1939 led to World War II, Lochner became the first foreign journalist to follow the German Army into battle. His bravery in remaining in Nazi Germany, despite the outbreak of hostilities, to provide objective and measured news coverage was rewarded with the 1939 Pulitzer Prize for correspondence.

He reported further on the German side of the war by accompanying the German Army on the Western Front in the Netherlands, Belgium, and France and witnessing the 1940 French armistice in Compiègne.

After the December 1941 declaration of war between Germany and the United States, the German government interned Americans remaining in the Third Reich. Lochner was held for nearly five months at Bad Nauheim near Frankfurt am Main before he was released in May 1942 as part of a prisoner exchange for interned German diplomats and correspondents.

Upon his release, Lochner took eight months' leave of absence for an extended lecture tour throughout North America, which he spent publicly attacking Nazism and warning of its dangers. In that interval he wrote a book warning of the fascist menace, What About Germany?

From 1942 to 1944 Lochner worked as a news analyst and radio commentator for the National Broadcasting Company. Then, he departed once again for Europe and as a war correspondent until after the war ended.

== Post-war ==
In 1948 Lochner translated and edited a volume of diary material by the Nazi propaganda chief, Joseph Goebbels, which attained considerable commercial success. That set him on a new path as a writer of non-fiction books. In the 1950s, Lochner published a further three volumes on various aspects of German history and current affairs.

Lochner also returned to his Lutheran roots as a member of the editorial board of The Lutheran Witness and a columnist for The Lutheran Layman and The Lutheran Witness Reporter.

In 1955, Lochner published his memoirs, Stets das Unerwartete: Erinnerungen aus Deutschland 1921–1953 (Always the Unexpected: Recollections of Germany 1921–1953). An English-language edition was published in 1956.

Lochner spent his later years compiling a series of articles for the quarterly journal of the Wisconsin Historical Society, which was published on the campus of his alma mater, the University of Wisconsin.

== Death and legacy ==
Lochner died on January 8, 1975, in Wiesbaden, West Germany.

In 2005, a posthumous volume of Lochner's German journalism was published as Journalist at the Brink: Louis P. Lochner in Berlin, 1922–1942 and was edited by Morrell Heald.

Lochner's papers are held at the Concordia Historical Institute in St. Louis, Missouri. An online finding aid is available. Many of the volumes from his personal library found their way to Valparaiso University in Indiana, an institution at which Lochner had lectured at various times during his career.

The archive of the Henry Ford Peace Expedition of 1915–1916, including scattered material by Lochner, is at Swarthmore College in Pennsylvania as part of its Peace Collection.

The papers of Lochner's son Robert, which include photographs of and correspondence by Louis Lochner, are at the Hoover Institution archives at Stanford University in Palo Alto, California.

== Works ==
=== Books and pamphlets ===
- 'The Cosmopolitan Club Movement', in Gustav Spiller, ed., Papers on Inter-Racial Problems Communicated to the First Universal Races Congress, London: P. S. King, 1911, p. 439ff.
  - Reprinted as The Cosmopolitan Club Movement, New York: American Association for International Conciliation, 1912.
- Internationalism Among Universities. Boston: World Peace Foundation, 1913.
- Personal Observations on the Outbreak of the War. Chicago: Chicago Peace Society, 1914.
- Pacifism and the Great War. Chicago: Chicago Peace Society, 1914.
- Wanted: Aggressive Pacifism. Chicago: Chicago Peace Society, 1915.
- The Neutral Conference for Continuous Mediation. Stockholm: Neutral Conference for Continuous Mediation, 1916.
- Mexico — Whose War? New York: The Peoples Print, n.d. [c. 1919].
- Die Staatsmännischen Experimente des Autokönigs Henry Ford (The Experiment in Statesmanship of Auto King Henry Ford). Munich: Verlag für Kulturpolitik, 1923.—Reissued as America's Don Quixote: Henry Ford's Attempt to Save Europe. (London, 1924) and Henry Ford: America's Don Quixote. (New York, 1925).
- What About Germany? New York: Dodd, Mead and Co., 1942.
- What About Poland? A Radio Broadcast over National Broadcasting Co. Beverly Hills, CA: Friends of Poland, 1944.
- Fritz Kreisler. New York: Macmillan, 1951.
- Tycoons and Tyrant: German Industry from Hitler to Adenauer. Chicago: Henry Regnery, 1954.
- Stets das Unerwartete: Erinnerungen aus Deutschland 1921–1953 (Always the Unexpected: Recollections of Germany, 1921–1953). Darmstadt: Franz Schneekluth Verlag, 1955.
- Always the Unexpected: A Book of Reminiscences. New York: Macmillan, 1956.
- Herbert Hoover and Germany. New York: Macmillan, 1960.

=== Edited or translated ===
- Margaret Leng, The Wood-Peasant's Grandchild. Germany: Johannes Herrmann, n.d. [c. 1920s].
- Rosa Luxemburg, Letters to Karl and Luise Kautsky from 1896 to 1918. New York, R.M. McBride and Co., 1925.
- Joseph Goebbels, The Goebbels Diaries, 1942–1943. Garden City, NY: Doubleday, 1948.

=== Selected articles ===
- "Our Man in Berlin: As an American journalist in Germany, Louis Lochner told the story of the rise and fall of the Third Reich," by Meg Jones, On Wisconsin Magazine, (Summer 2017.)
- "Communications and the Mass-Produced Mind," Wisconsin Magazine of History, vol. 41, no. 4 (Summer 1958), pp. 244–251.
- "Aboard the Airship Hindenburg: Louis P. Lochner's Diary of Its Maiden Flight to the United States," Wisconsin Magazine of History, vol. 49, no. 2 (Winter 1965/66), pp. 101–121.
- "Round Robins from Berlin: Louis P. Lochner's Letters to His Children, 1932–1941," Wisconsin Magazine of History, vol. 50, no. 4 (Summer 1967), pp. 291–336.
- "The Blitzkrieg in Belgium: A Newsman's Eyewitness Account," Wisconsin Magazine of History, vol. 50, no. 4 (Summer 1967), pp. 337–346.
