= History of The New York Times (1896–1945) =

Aspect of newspaper history

In August 1896, Chattanooga Times publisher Adolph Ochs acquired The New-York Times, implementing significant alterations to the newspaper's structure. Ochs established the Times as a merchant's newspaper and removed the hyphen from the newspaper's name. In 1905, The New York Times opened the Times Tower, marking expansion. The Times experienced a political realignment in the 1910s amid several disagreements within the Republican Party. The New York Times reported on the sinking of the Titanic as other newspapers were cautious about bulletins from the Associated Press. Through managing editor Carr Van Anda, the Times focused on scientific advancements, reporting on Albert Einstein's then-unknown theory of general relativity and becoming involved in the discovery of the tomb of Tutankhamun.

In April 1935, Ochs died, leaving his son-in-law Arthur Hays Sulzberger as publisher. The Great Depression forced Sulzberger to reduce the Times's operations, and developments in the New York newspaper landscape resulted in the formation of larger newspapers, such as the New York Herald Tribune and the New York World-Telegram. In contrast to Ochs, Sulzberger encouraged wirephotography.

The New York Times extensively covered World War II through large headlines, reporting on exclusive stories such as the Yugoslav coup d'état. Amid the war, Sulzberger began expanding the Times's operations further, acquiring WQXR-FM in 1944—the first non-Times investment since the Jones era—and established a fashion show in Times Hall. Despite reductions as a result of conscription, The New York Times retained the largest journalism staff of any newspaper. The Times's print edition became available internationally during the war through the Army & Air Force Exchange Service; The New York Times Overseas Weekly later became available in Japan through The Asahi Shimbun and in Germany through the Frankfurter Zeitung. The international edition would develop into a separate newspaper. Journalist William L. Laurence publicized the atomic bomb race between the United States and Germany, resulting in the Federal Bureau of Investigation seizing copies of the Times. The United States government recruited Laurence to document the Manhattan Project in April 1945. Laurence became the only witness of the Manhattan Project, a detail realized by employees of The New York Times following the atomic bombing of Hiroshima.

== 1896–1900: Ochs's purchase and revitalization ==
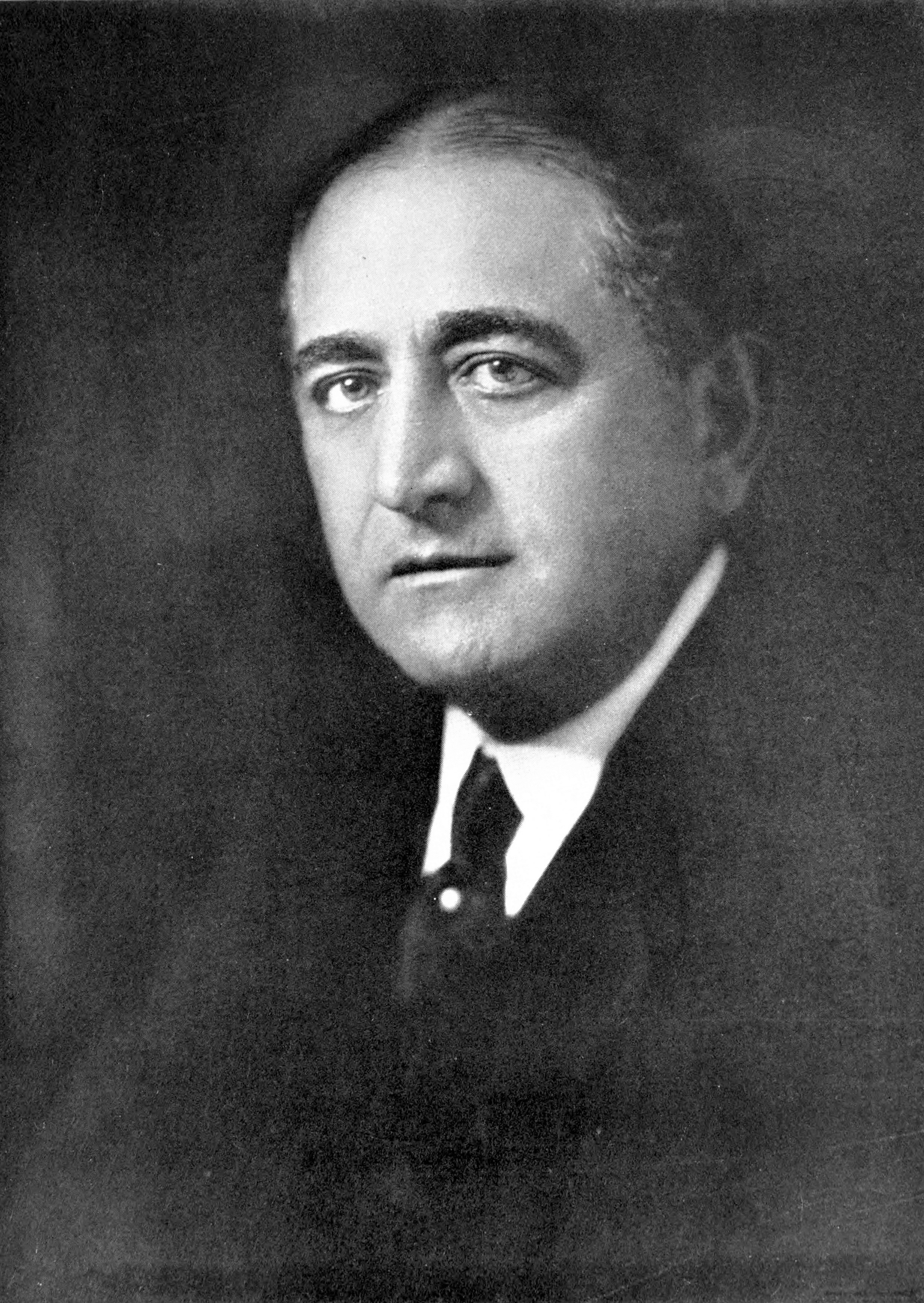
In 1896, Chattanooga Times publisher Adolph Ochs purchased The New-York Times.

In May 1895, Chattanooga Times publisher Adolph Ochs considered purchasing the New York Mercury, a dying Democratic publication that supported the free silver movement, at the behest of his acquaintance Leopold Wallach. Ochs was still recovering from the panic of 1893 and did not want to build up another newspaper business in the South; a deal for the Nashville American fell through. Wallach was a noted opponent of free silver but befriended some of the "silver senators" who built the Mercury into a Democratic organ. Likewise, Ochs supported the gold standard, as did the Chattanooga Times. By the fall of 1875, Ochs was actively interested in purchasing the New York Mercury but stipulated that he must have control over its editorial content. He thoroughly examined the paper's plant and financials. The deal fell through in March 1896 after the Mercury's owners included a clause allowing them to vacate the plant and after Ochs discovered that the United Press was unwilling to transfer publishers.

On March 12, 1896—his 38th birthday—Ochs received a telegram from Harry Alloway, a member of The New-York Times's Wall Street staff. Alloway, who had previously met him at a trip to Tennessee in 1890, informed Ochs of the Times's situation and proposed that he should purchase the paper. Chicago Times-Herald publisher H. H. Kohlsaat convinced him that he would have the caliber to run The New-York Times, and, after talking with stockholder Sam Thomas and Computing-Tabulating-Recording Company founder Charles Ranlett Flint, Alloway gave Ochs the opportunity to purchase the Times if he ran it for at least a year without incurring debt. After hearing that Alloway persuaded Thomas and Flint, Wallach became as eager as Ochs was. Ochs began meeting with other figures, including Charles Ransom Miller, Flint, and Spencer Trask. Flint and Trask developed a plan to reorganize the company, but it required more money than Ochs could provide. A portion of stockholders believed that The New-York Times should consolidate with The New York Recorder to form the Times-Recorder Company. Efforts to consolidate the two companies fell through after Miller and Edward Cary put the Times into the receivership of Alfred Ely, who doubted Ochs's ability to stave off Hearst, Pulitzer, and James Gordon Bennett Jr., but had a change of heart upon meeting with him.

Rumors in Printing House Square began circulating, with the most prominent stating that Wall Street would control The New-York Times with Ochs at the helm. The rumor cited J. P. Morgan and August Belmont's ownership of US$25,000 (equivalent to $967,500 in 2025) in debenture. In mid-June 1896, stockholders accepted Ochs's plan to form a new company with a capital of 10,000 shares worth US$100 (equivalent to $3,870 in 2025). As a persuasive, Ochs offered fifteen shares for US$1,000 (equivalent to $38,700 in 2025) bond. He purchased 1,125 shares of stock through bonds worth a total of US$75,000 (equivalent to $2,902,500 in 2025) and placed the remaining stock, 3,876 shares, in escrow, giving him 5,001 shares of the 10,000 shares. The plan was declared operative on July 2. Court proceedings dragged throughout the summer; Ochs accused Elys of intentionally delaying the court procedure and told his wife, Effie, "He will certainly not be on my board of directors. He has cooked his goose with me. He has given me entirely too much anxiety to enlist my future friendship."

I have succeeded 'way beyond my fondest hopes, and with God's help will maintain the position with credit. I am a lucky fellow.

— Adolph Ochs, August 18, 1896

On August 13, 1896, Ochs officially purchased The New-York Times, and he was formally installed at 3:30 p.m. on August 18, the same day he moved into his office at 71 Park Row. The following day, the Times carried his declaration of principle, drafted with Effie. In the following months, he would come to know his staff. He displayed a particular admiration for Henry Loewenthal, a business-minded editor who eventually became managing editor until 1904. With Loewenthal, Ochs introduced a section entitled, "Arrival of Buyers" (Note: The first issue was titled "Buyers In Town") on September 20, 1896, that solidified The New-York Times as a merchant's newspaper. Loewenthal himself received a Monday financial review on November 8, 1897, eventually becoming a separate Times publication titled The Annalist. Ochs's focus on business news was met with ridicule from general news reporters, but ultimately brought new readers and advertising. In comparison to other publishers, he expanded the letter to the editor section and allowed critics of the Times to write to editors. Ochs respected Frederick Craig Mortimer, a columnist, and allowed him to start a section titled "Topics of The Times". Mortimer retired in 1926 and was replaced by Simeon Strunsky.

By 1869, readers sought to buy newspapers that were exclusively newspapers. Charles Anderson Dana's The Sun favored features over full coverage of the news. Newspapers that billed themselves as exclusively news—the New York Mercury, The New York Recorder, and the New-York Commercial Advertiser—were dying. The New York Tribune purchased the Recorder that year and inherited the paper's use of lithographs. In one Sunday issue, the Tribune gave away a lithograph of a basket of strawberries and a bottle of champagne. The move was so controversial that the Tribune ended the lithographs. Pulitzer's New York World berated the Times for "[losing] US$1,750,000 [equivalent to $6,772,500 in 2025]". Ochs continued to run the Times as usual as Dana mounted attacks against the paper and yellow journalism. He implemented a series of trivial changes, including removing Miller's fiction, altering the kerning and thinning the columns, bought better newsprint and ink, removed advertisements that generated the paper no revenue, and implemented datelines. He purchased nascent automatic space-equalizers to speed up production. The Sunday supplement, first issued on September 6, 1898, focused on current events, in comparison to the reused material other newspapers used at the time. In December, The New-York Times became The New York Times.

In October, the staff of The New-York Times tentatively chose the slogan, "All the News That's Fit to Print", but created a contest to decide a better name, judged by The Century Magazine editor Richard Watson Gilder. Entries were limited: the motto or phrase could not exceed more than ten words—a clause many contestants ignored—and the Times ignored entries from women. The author of the winning submission would receive US$100 (equivalent to $3,870 in 2025). A variety of slogans were entered in thousands of postcards, including rhymes—"We use all news fit to peruse"—and at least one acrostic—"The Information Mankind Earnestly Seeks"—with many containing a "pure" or "clean" undertone. The winner was D.M. Redfield of New Haven, Connecticut, who penned, "All The World's News, but Not a School for Scandal". Although Ochs enjoyed the slogan, he ultimately stuck with his original slogan, first printed on October 25, 1896. It became a part of the front page on February 10, 1897. The contest earned the paper further recognition nationally; the slogan has since become a leitmotif of American journalism. The slogan was also materialized in electric lights on the north side of the Cumberland Hotel on 22nd Street and was chanted by a group of Times staff marching in the Sound Money Parade.

The Spanish–American War in 1898 brought about a new set of challenges for Ochs. Hearst and Pulitzer were able to send dispatch boats and correspondents at a rate met only by Bennett. The New York Times prominently displayed the Associated Press's coverage to compensate and entered into a combination with the New York Evening Mail and the Commercial Advertiser; neither effort succeeded. In a final move, he lowered the price back to one cent (equivalent to $0.39 in 2025) in October. The announcement was met by condemnation. The Journalist argued that readers would pay for any price and that the Times would not attract new readers. The Buffalo Express invoked Raymond and Jones's legacy in their critique. Yellow publications spread the rumor that The New York Times was being financed by Tammany Hall leader Richard Croker and that lowering the price would benefit the Democratic Party. Firmly, Ochs pushed forward. Within a month, production increased from five to eight times more in some districts. Within a year, circulation went from 25,726 to 76,220.

== 1900–1908: Ochs era, international recognition, and Times Tower ==
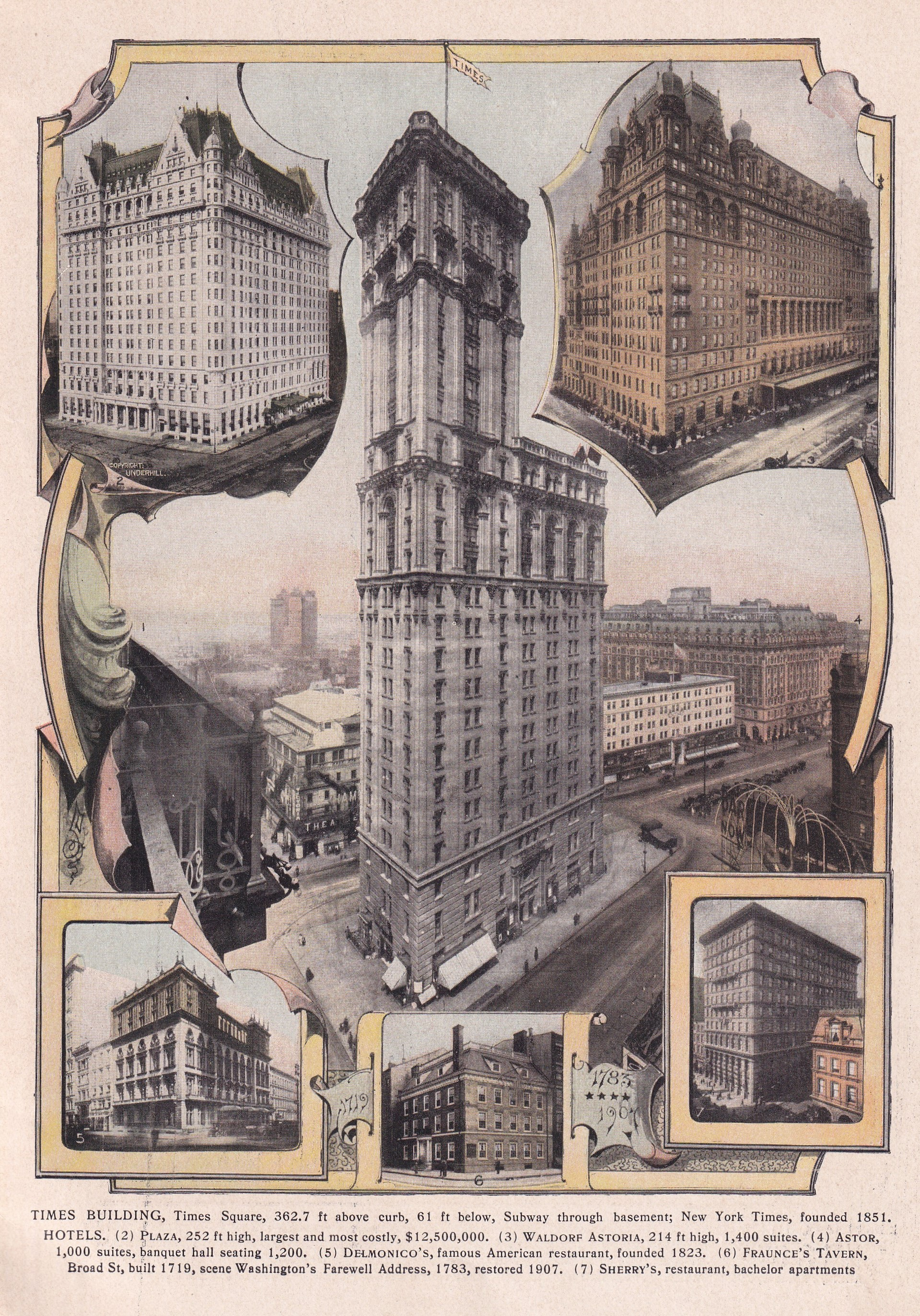
Times Tower, the headquarters of The New York Times until 1913.

In January 1900, Adolph Ochs sent for his brother and Chattanooga Times general manager, George, to print a special edition of The New York Times at that year's Paris Exposition. At a cost of US$50,000 (equivalent to $1,935,000 in 2025), George established six Linotype machines, an octuple Goss press, and a stereotyping plant. The plant was ready by March; it was visited by Leopold II of Belgium, who personally shook hands with Ochs. The special edition ran from June to October of that year. In Inter Ocean Publishing Co. v. Associated Press (1900), the Supreme Court of Illinois ruled that the Associated Press was a public utility, allowing The New York Times to receive full membership from its Class B status. In addition, Ochs became a chartered member and served on its board for twenty years. The reorganization committee was dissolved on July 1. In October, an alliance with The Times of London was discussed. Charles Frederic Moberly Bell, manager of The Times of London, proposed lending stories to the Times for a minimum of US$10,000 (equivalent to $387,000 in 2025) and forming the International Times. The resulting paper could have had an impact on Bennett's Paris Herald, but plans failed to materialize. At least one factor was that Ochs may have been labelled an Anglophile. The New York Times later purchased exclusive rights to The Times of London's coverage and shared expenses during special events, such as the Russo-Japanese War.

By 1901, The New York Times was an independent Democratic newspaper, though it supported Republican William McKinley in the 1900 presidential election for his support of sound money, which Democratic candidate William Jennings Bryan did not affirm. The Times continued to expand into the 20th century, particularly after the death of Queen Victoria and McKinley's assassination. Ochs planned a new building at 233 Broadway—the site of the present day Woolworth Building—in fall 1900 that would "wake up the natives". On July 1, 1902, the paper closed a deal to construct a new building at 42nd Street as the 233 Broadway plan fell through, much to Ochs's benefit; the construction of the first line of the New York City Subway contributed to northward growth, while Park Row was stagnant. The site at 42nd Street was a triangular plot between Broadway and Seventh Avenue, where the Pabst Hotel stood. In a front-page article, The New York Times claimed that the new building's proximity to a New York City Subway station would expand the paper's circulation. Architect Cyrus L. W. Eidlitz was hired to draft up plans for the building and site clearing began in December. Ochs's daughter, Iphigene Bertha Ochs, laid the cornerstone on January 18, 1904, murmuring, "I declare this stone to be laid plumb, level and square." The building—still under construction—was used to announce that Theodore Roosevelt won the 1904 presidential election by searchlight; the Times supported Democrat Alton B. Parker that year.

Following multiple delays and pluvial weather, the Times Tower opened on New Year's Eve to fireworks at a cost of US$2,500,000 (equivalent to $89,583,333.33 in 2025). The following morning, men from the Mergenthaler Linotype Company and R. Hoe & Company brought the machinery from 41 Park Row to the Times Tower by horseback. New Hoe presses and Linotype machines were purchased. Much of the building was paid for with sums from The Equitable Life Assurance Society of the United States, owned by James Hazen Hyde. Despite being financially invested by Equitable Life, The New York Times routinely covered the Armstrong Investigation, a New York State Legislature investigation into various life insurance companies initiated by alleged corporate malfeasance when Hyde hosted a Versailles-themed costume ball and was accused of spending US$200,000 (equivalent to $7,166,666.67 in 2025) through the company. Worried that Hearst may discover he was an Equitable debtor, Ochs told Marcellus Hartley Dodge Sr.—the grandson of arms dealer Marcellus Hartley who knew Ochs, that he wanted to take up the loan from Equitable and an additional US$300,000 (equivalent to $10,750,000 in 2025), offering his majority share in the Times as collateral. Dodge secretly put the stock certificates in a safety deposit box until 1916, when The New York Times paid the loan.

In February 1904, Ochs hired Carr Van Anda, a reporter for The Sun, as managing editor. Van Anda extensively covered the Russo-Japanese War through The Times of London. The war dispatch detailing the Battle of Port Arthur for The New York Times was the first wireless report of a naval engagement. The telegraph was conducted by the Marconi Wireless Telegraph Co, who would continue to work with The New York Times thereafter, including transmitting the first account of an ocean disaster when the crew of the SS Cymric saved several dozen men aboard the St. Cuthbert, a freighter set ablaze in 1908 off Cape Sable Island. Under Van Anda, the Times entered an agreement to syndicate stories with the Chicago Tribune, including the account of the St. Cuthbert explosion. The New York Times was the first publication to report on explorer Robert Peary's expedition to the North Pole. Peary first contacted the New York Herald and requested two men who had gone over to the Times. The Herald's editor expressed little interest in covering Peary's expedition; the Times, by contrast, paid Peary US$4,000 (equivalent to $143,333.33 in 2025) for exclusive rights to his story. A year later, surgeon Frederick Cook claimed to have reached the North Pole before Peary and sold his story to the New York Herald. English journalist Philip Gibbs publicly downplayed Cook's claims in an interview with him in which Cook admitted that the only people who witnessed his feat were Eskimos. Several days later, Peary telegraphed that he had made it to the North Pole.

== 1908–1918: Political realignment, the Titanic, and World War I ==
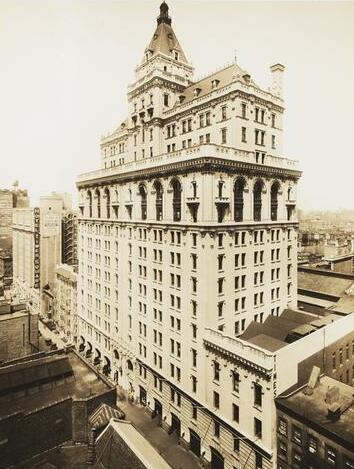
229 West 43rd Street, the headquarters of The New York Times until 2007.

In June 1908, Van Anda recruited Oscar King Davis to obtain William Howard Taft's platform amid breaks in the Republican Party's policy. Through senator William Borah, Davis obtained the platform and published it, much to the chagrin of the White House. The New York Times continued to oppose William Jennings Bryan's candidacy, supporting Taft in the 1908 presidential election. In the 1912 election, the Times supported Woodrow Wilson in an editorial. Wilson attributed his victory to the editorial; at the time, his gubernatorial record was marked by radicalism, much of which was subsided. The New York Times affirmed its support for Wilson amid fears that moderate factions of the Democratic Party would not support him. The Times did not entirely support Wilson's policies but disavowed the conservatism of Champ Clark. The paper continued to support Wilson through his presidency, including the passage of the Underwood-Simmons tariff. That year, Ochs began the tradition of lowering a lit ball on New Year's Day from the Times Tower. The Times Square Ball is dropped every year.

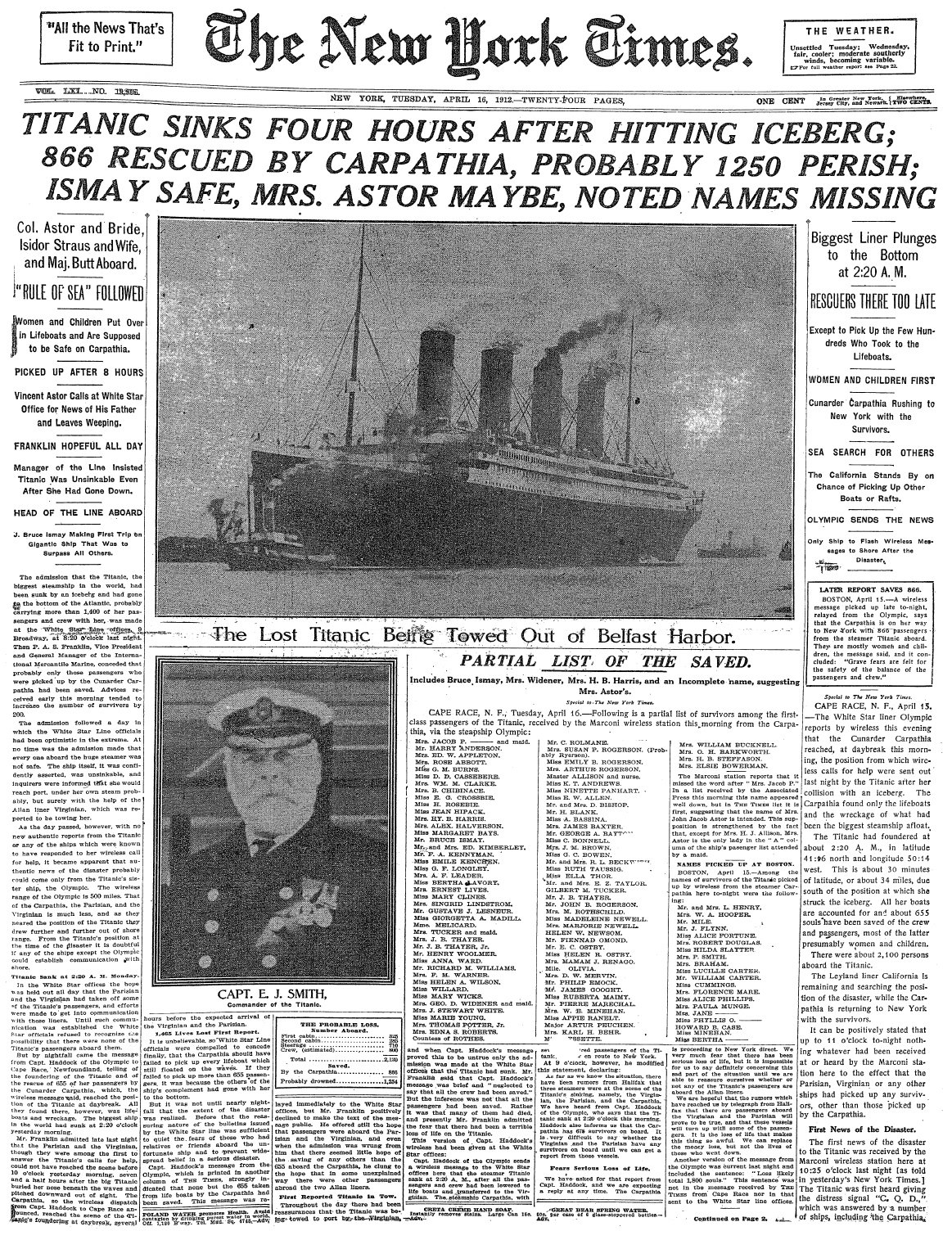
The New York Times on April 16, 1912, covering the sinking of the Titanic.

In the following years, The New York Times actively attempted to get exclusive coverage. In May 1910, Glenn Curtiss attempted to claim the US$10,000 (equivalent to $345,535.71 in 2025) prize set by the New York World by flying from Albany to New York City in a single day. Van Anda had boarded a New York Central Railroad train to follow his plane with Curtiss's wife, Lena, a maneuver deemed "too dangerous" for a lagged World reporter. In the early morning hours of April 15, 1912, the Associated Press released a bulletin stating that the RMS Titanic had reportedly signaled that it had hit an iceberg to a Marconi station. Thirty minutes later, the Titanic flashed an SOS signal and sunk. White Star Line executives reassured journalists that the Titanic was unsinkable. Against editors in New York and London, Van Anda sent his secretary and head of the archival library Tommy Bracken to unearth as much as possible about the Titanic. The issue of The New York Times that morning included a four-line header. The issue also included a two-column advertisement for a Titanic voyage later that week. By April 19, the Times had estimated 1,595 had died, though a Senate inquiry determined that 1,517 had died. The edition of The New York Times that day became a collector's item, and has been regarded as a great disaster report amid caution from other newspapers.

By 1911, The New York Times required more physical space; its staffing had increased and the growth of the metropolitan area necessitated more mechanical equipment, particularly for The Sunday Times. The mechanical basement was excavated a further 65 feet (20 m), though the Times continued to face pressures to circulate more copies. In March 1911, the paper purchased the fee simple from 221 to 229 West 43rd Street, from theatre owner Lee Shubert. Connected to the Times Tower through pneumatic tubes, the buildings would serve as an annex for the mechanical and editorial departments. Mortimer J. Fox was contracted to erect a building at 229 West 43rd Street. Work began in March 1912 and completed in August 1913; during construction, the Times printed issues from the building. By the time of its completion, six hundred employees occupied 229 West 43rd Street, making The New York Times one of the largest employers in the area. The Times made the building its headquarters on February 2, 1913, but continued to use the Times Tower for publication and subscription offices until 1961. In April 1913, The New York Times added an eighth column.

World War I presented journalistic difficulties that had not been experienced in The New York Times's coverage of the American Civil War. Adolph Ochs worked out a news exchange with The London Chronicle to enhance the Times's coverage of the war. Several correspondents were present in the German Empire as Times reporters; Frederic W. Wile was the first until his arrest, followed by Cyril Brown until the United States entered the war. Garet Garrett arrived in Berlin in 1915. The New York Times published the so-called British White Paper, hundreds of correspondence letters between the Foreign Office and the Central Powers leading up to the United Kingdom's declaration of war against Germany. A day later, the Times provided Kaiser Wilhelm II's perspective through Wile. The New York Times's two-sided approach continued into its coverage of the war itself, including the occupation of Lille, the Battle of Liège, and the siege of Namur. The Sunday issue contained war photographs in the rotogravure section with exceeding quality.

Although The New York Times editorially believed that Austria and Germany were at fault for the war, the paper published documents from the war in full, without commentary. Supporters of German accused Ochs of giving in to The Times of London owner Lord Northcliffe's bias, while readers who sided with the Allies were not pleased with German arguments being presented alongside Allied arguments. Accusations that the Times gives in to British interests reoccurred in a Senatorial Committee in 1915; Montana senator Thomas J. Walsh insinuated editor-in-chief Charles Ransom Miller and Van Anda acted on behalf of the British in opposing Wilson's ship-purchase bill, questing deletions from a London dispatch stating that British steamship lines were outrageously charging American refugees that were not present in the New York World or the New York Tribune. In particular, Walsh stated that he "was informed" through a letter he received claiming from a member of the gentlemen's club the Junior Constitutional Club that a "well-known Englishman" was supporting Ochs with money to gain control of the paper. The letter appeared to be signed by an Arthur M. Abbey; the writer was never identified and never came forward.

The United States's entrance into World War I affected the paper's operations. Logistically, the war increased cable costs from US$15,000 (equivalent to $376,948.05 in 2025) to US$750,000 (equivalent to $18,847,402.6 in 2025). War fever spread through The New York Times and several employees served in the war. Julius Ochs Adler, Ochs's nephew, went to serve overseas in the 77th Infantry Division. Five employees died, including Joyce Kilmer of the Sunday department, who became a sergeant in the 69th Infantry Regiment. Invigorated by a peace bid by Austria, Miller—whose previous work earned him much praise, wrote a controversial editorial advocating for Austria's position. The Times was accused of "running up the white flag" as scorn and denounicatory letters rolled in upon the paper. The Union League Club, composed of the most influential men in New York, scheduled a meeting to consider publicly denouncing The New York Times. Much to Ochs's surprise, several members refused to attend the meeting. New York Central Railroad president Chauncey Depew defended the paper in a letter to club secretary Henry C. Quimby, as did jurist Elihu Root and entrepreneur Frank Woolworth.

== 1918–1928: Continued scientific coverage ==
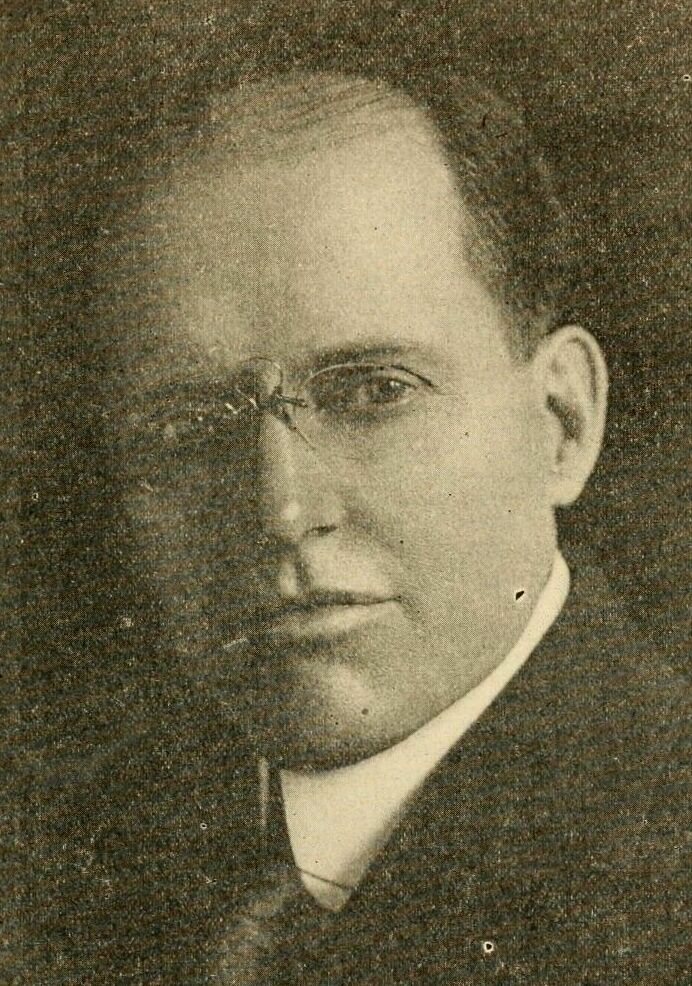
Carr Van Anda promoted scientific coverage in The New York Times.

In the days following the end of World War I, The New York Times continued its coverage of the war. Van Anda sent correspondent Edwin Leland James to the Rhine and Walter Duranty to occupied Germany. James, Duranty, Charles H. Grasty, Charles Selden, and Ernst Marshall worked under Richard V. Oulahan on covering peace negotiations. James offered to provide the Times with a preliminary copy of the Treaty of Versailles, but the paper had already obtained the treaty through a Chicago Tribune reporter who gave the treaty to Borah. Van Anda opened a total of twenty-four telephone lines. The June 10, 1918, issue of The New York Times carried the treaty in full. The Times was able to obtain and publish several exclusive stories during the Paris Peace Conference despite the disapproval of some readers. Editorially, the Times supported the League of Nations wholeheartedly even as the United States refused to join. As the conference continued to play out, The New York Times returned to its coverage of technological advancements, such as the first transatlantic flight completed by a Curtiss NC-4. From 1896 to 1921, daily circulation increased from 9,000 to 323,000 and annual advertising lineage from 2,227,000 to 23,447,000 lines. In August 1920, Walter Lippmann and Charles Merz published A Test of the News, concluding that—in reporting on the Russian Revolution—the Times fabricated events and erroneously printed that the Bolsheviks were precarious ninety-one times.

The New York Times focused on scientific news more than any other paper, an importance shared by E. W. Scripps of Scripps-Howard. Much of the Times's scientific coverage was done by John Swinton, an editorial writer. In 1860, Swinton wrote three and a half columns regarding the reprint of On the Origin of Species (1859) by Charles Darwin. An academic who studied astronomy and physics at Ohio University, Van Anda was eager to report on Albert Einstein in 1919. Einstein, a relatively unknown European theoretical physicist, formulated the equivalence principle and used the principle to test the gravitational pull of the Sun as an object passed close to its photosphere. The solar eclipse of May 29, 1919 provided the Royal Astronomical Society with a tangible way to test Einstein's theory, attracting the attention of Van Anda. The Einstein contention of general relativity juxtaposed the Newtonian theory of gravitation and the Times's coverage of the findings of the eclipse provided Americans with an introduction to Einstein, though other newspapers remained uneasy of his theories.

The Times was involved in the discovery of the tomb of Tutankhamun through Van Anda's knowledge of Egyptian hieroglyphs. Van Anda sent Russell Owen to Princeton University for a photograph of a stele and discovered that eventual pharaoh Horemheb had attempted to erase Tutankhamun's signature in place of his own. The Horemheb forgery was a theory proposed by French Egyptologist Le Grain but never developed. Egyptologist Philip K. Hitti called the discovery a "most remarkable example of scholarly intuition and acumen". Several weeks later, Alva Johnston was sent to cover the American Association for the Advancement of Science's support of evolution, much to the ire of William Jennings Bryan, John Roach Straton, and other fundamentalists. The next day, the Times carried the first newspaper story about isotopes and alpha particles. Johnston's coverage earned him a Pulitzer Prize in 1922. The New York Times also carried crime stories, including extensive coverage of the shooting of architect Stanford White in 1906. Broad coverage occurred when the paper felt that injustice had occurred, such as the lynching of Leo Frank.

On July 18, 1922, Charles Miller died. His obituary covered the following day's editorial page, and Ochs, the Times editorial board, and Miller's associates followed his body to the Woodland Cemetery. Miller left his holdings in The New York Times to his two children; he was replaced by Rollo Ogden, a former New York Evening Post journalist. The Times experienced another loss with Van Anda's retirement in 1925. Prior to retiring, Van Anda had two major stories. In late July 1923, president Warren G. Harding fell ill. Van Anda sent Jim Hagerty to the president. Hagerty was staying at the Okema in Ludlow when he received news that Harding had died. By luck, Edward Klauber called the Okema attempting to reach Hagery but had reached a line in Rutland with Calvin Coolidge's stenographer, Edwin Geisser. Geisser gave Klauber as much detail as he requested, and the Times had exceptional coverage of Coolidge's inauguration. The day Van Anda retired, The New York Times had thorough coverage of the solar eclipse of January 24, 1925. Frederick T. Birchall was appointed managing editor in 1925, bringing a bout of liberalism with sports bylines.

Throughout 1924, The New York Times continued to experience much of the success that it had earlier in the century. The paper's gross income exceeded US$20,000,000 (equivalent to $375,728,155.34 in 2025) that year while its Wide World photo service had one hundred employees by 1925. The Times's global coverage was supported by a superheterodyne receiver on top of 229 West 43rd Street to receive dispatches from the United Kingdom, France, and Germany, Italy, and Switzerland later expanding to Japan, China, and the Dutch West Indies. William Beebe gave readers stories from the tropical sea while Auguste Piccard reported from the stratosphere. By the end of the year, circulation was up to 351,000 and advertising lineage increased to 26,000,000. Despite Van Anda's departure, the Times continued to support scientific discoveries. In 1927, Ochs hired Waldemar Kaempffert, a science writer whom journalist Meyer Berger considered to be the first member of an editorial board exclusively devoted to science. Ochs would hire William L. Laurence three years later. Laurence and Kaempffery were frequently the first to report on new developments in science, such as sulfa drugs, penicillin, adrenocorticotropic hormones, and cortisone.

== 1928–1939: Ochs's death, first Sulzberger era, and interwar period ==
I am deeply distressed to learn of the passing of my old friend. His great contribution to journalism and to good citizenship will always be remembered.

— Franklin D. Roosevelt, April 13, 1935

By 1928, The New York Times had a gross income of US$27,000,000 (equivalent to $506,250,000 in 2025). In August 1930, Herbert Pulitzer, grandson of Joseph Pulitzer, met with Ochs at the Ritz-Carlton Hotel to discuss selling the New York World, much to Ochs's surprise. Pulitzer suggested disposing of the Morning World and the Sunday issue to focus on the Evening World. Discussing the proposition with Arthur Hays Sulzberger and Julius Ochs Adler, Ochs returned to the Ritz-Carlton. He contended that Pulitzer should instead put out a newspaper similar to the Daily Mail—a "condensed but not sensational" newspaper—and did not believe it was appropriate for the "ultraconservative" Times to acquire the paper, believing William Randolph Hearst's New York American to be a more suitable consolidator. General manager Florence D. White stated that if Ochs rejected the offer, the paper would be sold to Ogden Mills Reid's nascent New York Herald Tribune, formed in 1924 by the merger of the New York Herald and Tribune, which would present Ochs with a serious threat. In February 1931, the Morning World and the Sunday World ceased to exist and the Evening World was consolidated into the Scripps-Howard Telegram, becoming the New York World-Telegram. In April 1932, James became managing editor when Birchall went to Berlin. His final stories covered his experience in the Soviet Union and Joseph Stalin's totalitarian and autocratic rule.

Ochs's authority decreased into the 1920s as his health began to deteriorate. On April 8, 1935, at approximately 1:45 p.m., Ochs suffered a cerebral hemorrhage following a long illness. An ambulance took him to Newell Sanitarium. Surrounded by his brother, his sister and her husband, his nephew, and his granddaughter, Ochs died at 3:55 p.m. As his body was laid to rest at the Temple Israel Cemetery in Hastings-on-Hudson, New York City's flags were half-staffed. On May 7, the board elected Sulzberger as president and director. Adler became general manager. The following day, the Times editorial page carried Sulzberger's creed to continue Ochs's work. Under his will, Ochs's heirs inherited the Chattanooga Times. Sulzberger urged picture editor Charles M. Graves to hold off on any radical changes to the paper's layout for at least a year and attempted to reduce operating costs, including considering selling The Annalist, Current History, and Mid-Week Pictorial. Drawing contrast with his predecessor, Sulzberger supported wirephoto—a technology disdained by Ochs in the last years of his life after it was discovered the Associated Press did not consult him on using it. Sulzberger's interest in wirephotography gave rise to an increase in photography in the Times in general; the Times was able to wire a photograph of the wreckage of the USS Macon (ZRS-5) from San Francisco, startling users of the Associated Press's wirephoto service.

Sulzberger inherited a Times still reeling from the Great Depression; circulation numbers in 1935 were two-thirds of what they were in 1929. Over the next several years, he would cull many of the paper's publications, including Current History and Mid-Week Pictorial in 1936, though both publications faced an impending demise; the Sunday Times depreciated much of the value of Current History under Lester Markel, while Mid-Week Pictorial subdued as a result of the transition to wirephoto. The rotogravure section in the Sunday issue was also incorporated into The New York Times Magazine in 1942, an idea conceived by Markel decades prior but prevented by a newsprint shortage and Ochs's illness. The Annalist was sold to McGraw-Hill Publishing in October 1940 and World Wide Photos was sold to the Associated Press in 1941. Continuing to adhere to Ochsian principle, The News of the Week in Review was started in the Sunday issue. The weekly review was another Markel idea, but it faced opposition from Ochs, who assumed that readers read every issue for that week in full. The Review debuted on January 27, 1935, when Ochs's illness affected his ability to read every issue, bringing about substantial circulation. In October 1936 the papers reporter Leo Kieran participated in a race to travel around the world on commercial airline flights, together with H. R. Ekins of the New York World-Telegram and Dorothy Kilgallen of the New York Journal. The race took 18 ½ days.

Officially it is just a civil war they are fighting in Spain, but people for whom realities count more than diplomatic amenities are starting to call it the Little World War.

— Arthur Hays Sulzberger, November 1936

In February 1937, The New York Times started a column titled, "In Europe"—later "Affairs in Europe" and eventually "Abroad"—written by correspondent Anne O'Hare McCormick. McCormick was previously noted for reporting on fascism in Europe, warning of Benito Mussolini's rise in 1921. As Sulzberger took the reins from Ochs, fascism continued to grip Europe; Mussolini prepared to go to war with Ethiopia, Adolf Hitler founded the Wehrmacht to fulfill the goal of retaking Nazi Germany's lost territory and to annex new territories. Domestically, the New Deal faced opposition while the Great Depression continued. The Spanish coup of July 1936 precipitated the Spanish Civil War. While in Seville, Frank Kluckhohn was the first to report on thirty-two German and Italian planes supporting the Nationalist faction. Germany and Italy did not want their intervention in the war to be publicized and the revelation nearly cost Kluckhohn his life, forcing him to flee Spain. By 1938, a tense air surrounded much of the world as the Anschluss and the occupation of Czechoslovakia solidified the beginning of a global war. During this time, The New York Times faced its own issues. On February 22, 1937, editorial head Rollo Ogden died. Sulzberger appointed John H. Finley to Ogden's post in April, though Finley would retire in November 1938 but retained his role in the Times as editor emeritus; Charles Merz became the head of the editorial page. Finley suffered a coronary embolism in his sleep in March 1940. On the morning of May 6, 1937, Ochs's widow, Effie Wise, died. Sulzberger continued to feign neutrality until June 1938.

The paper experienced an editorial shift as a byproduct of Charles Merz's shared ideology with Sulzberger. While the Times shifted its spacing to cover more of the war, the paper's editorials had a strong crusading spirit; though this belief was in opposition to what Ochs had established, Sulzberger and Merz felt as though the paper was firmly established as a newspaper for news and could properly split its editorials from its news. The New York Times was compelled to establish that the United States had an international role to play and that it needed to defend itself, government structure, and civil liberties to uphold democracy. The Times urged the United States to impose sanctions, as Europe had, on Italy following the country's war in Ethiopia. Through dwindling hope for the League of Nations in other newspapers, The New York Times wrote that the United States must shoulder its responsibilities "as a world power". The most extensive of these editorials came in February 1937, when the Times vehemently opposed Roosevelt's efforts to expand the Supreme Court. Fifty editorials were written before Roosevelt ultimately ended his plan six months later. Gay Talese described The New York Times of the 1930s as a Roman Catholic paper.

== 1939–1945: World War II, the Manhattan Project, and international edition ==
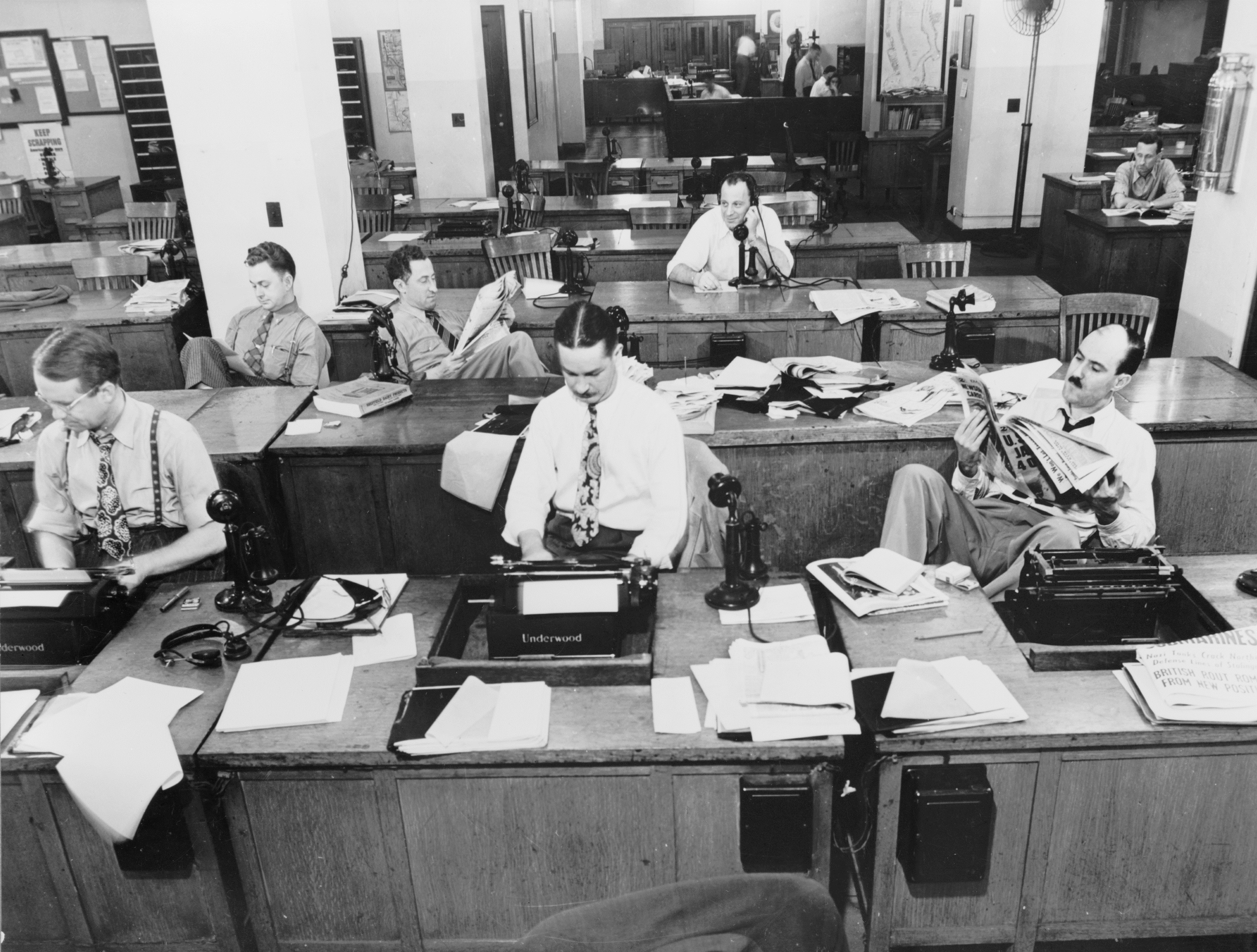
The New York Times newsroom, pictured in 1942.

On September 1, 1939, Germany invaded Poland. At the Reichstag building, Hitler gave a speech accusing Poland of attacking Germany heard by The New York Times's radio room. The Sunday issue of the Times on September 3 carried a seldom-used top line reading, "Chamberlain Announces Britain Is At War With Germany". The issue carried Neville Chamberlain's full shortwave address to the United Kingdom. As World War II continued, the Times used largescale headlines to update readers on the development of the war, including the occupation of Denmark, the invasion of the Netherlands, Luxembourg, and Belgium. As Ochs had focused on delivering the news over advertisements during World War I, Sulzberger made room for developments in World War II. The Times reported on several exclusive stories, including the Yugoslav coup d'état. The war also resulted in several casualties. Byron Darnton, a war correspondent covering the Pacific War, was killed by an American B-25 Mitchell bomber in New Guinea; his work was valued by Douglas MacArthur. Other casualties include London correspondent Bob Post who died during the bombing of Wilhemshaven in February 1943.

The New York Times experimented with several ideas and forged its own political structure. The Times rejected the "Independent Democrat" label during the Ochs era and supported Republican Wendell Willkie in 1940, believing that an unprecedented third term for any president would not be beneficial for the country, though forwent the third term principle to support Franklin D. Roosevelt in 1944 under the presumption that he would win the war over a nascent candidate. As The New York Times Magazine flourished and the Times grew to the largest staff in the world, Sulzberger ran a women's column, "News of Food", that received criticism. Sulzberger established the "Fashion of The Times"—a fashion show held in the Times Hall—amid hesitation from editorial staff; Ochs had run fashion contests as far back as 1913. The fashion show was much the work of Virginia Pope, a fashion editor who ran several smaller fashion shows in women's clubs but desired a larger audience. The Fashion of the Times earned the paper substantial gains. In 1944, the Federal Communications Commission (FCC) approved the Times's acquisition of WQXR-FM, marking the first non-Times investment since the Jones era.

Amid World War II, Sulzberger and his assistant, James Reston, traveled from Habbaniyah, Iraq to Tehran to meet Donald H. Connolly at the Persian Gulf Service Command Headquarters. Connolly's men supplied Allied troops; while beneficial, they felt that their work was disconnected from combat, monotonous, and tedious in extreme hot temperatures. Sulzberger proposed keeping the troops informed to improve their morale. The Times would provide the armed forces with an eight-page paper subtitled Overseas Weekly, a smaller version of The News of the Week in Review. Army Special Services was initially eager to work with The New York Times but backed out upon realizing that other newspapers would be infuriated if they discovered that the Times was the sole provider of news to the troops. An aide to Connolly suggested that the Times could be sold as a commodity through the Army & Air Force Exchange Service. The New York Times cast matrices in plastic and flew them to Iran. Bookkeepers could not accept free commodities, so the issues were sold at US$7.20 (equivalent to $133.96 in 2025). The Overseas Weekly issue was a success and would later be available in Japan through The Asahi Shimbun and in Germany through the Frankfurter Zeitung.

By the end of World War II in 1945, over nine hundred employees of the Times had left to serve in the Army, Navy, and Marine Corps. Delegates at the United Nations Conference on International Organization in April 1945 were surprised to have received a four-page copy of The New York Times dated at 2 a.m. The special edition facsimile was the first of its kind; it was set in type in New York and sent to an Associated Press receiver at the San Francisco Chronicle Building at 901 Mission Street. The paper negatives were processed at the Richmond Independent processing plant. Through the conference, the Times provided the United Nations delegates with this service for free. The New York Times would attempt facsimile in February 1948 to fourteen department stores in New York and the Columbia University School of Journalism. For Roosevelt's death, Sulzberger turned to the blackened borders that were present for the assassination of Abraham Lincoln, but limited its scope to the Roosevelt editorial. To triumphantly declare the signage of the German Instrument of Surrender and the end of World War II in Europe, the Times used a rare four-line display foremost proclaiming, "The war in Europe is ended!"

The staff of The New York Times questioned the sudden disappearance of science reporter William L. Laurence in April 1945, though managing editor Edwin Leland James and Sulzberger were vaguely aware of his assignment. Leading up to World War II, Laurence was versed in the activities of the Columbia University Physics Department, including the discovery of Uranium-235. Writing for The Saturday Evening Post in September 1940, Laurence publicized the atomic bomb race between the United States and Germany. Copies of the paper in public libraries were seized by the Federal Bureau of Investigation, and soon thereafter scientists sought to avoid Laurence. He theorized that they were working on an atomic bomb and did not attempt to investigate the matter further. The United States government requested Laurence's services in April 1945 and he was made the historian of the Manhattan Project. Laurence regularly spoke to the project's director, Leslie Groves, and provided eyewitness accounts of the tests, including Trinity. Believing the tests to be major stories themselves, Laurence wrote a confidential letter to Sulzberger. The staff of the Times learned through the atomic bombing of Hiroshima that Laurence was the sole witness of the Manhattan Project.
