= Anne O'Hare McCormick =

American journalist (1880–1954)

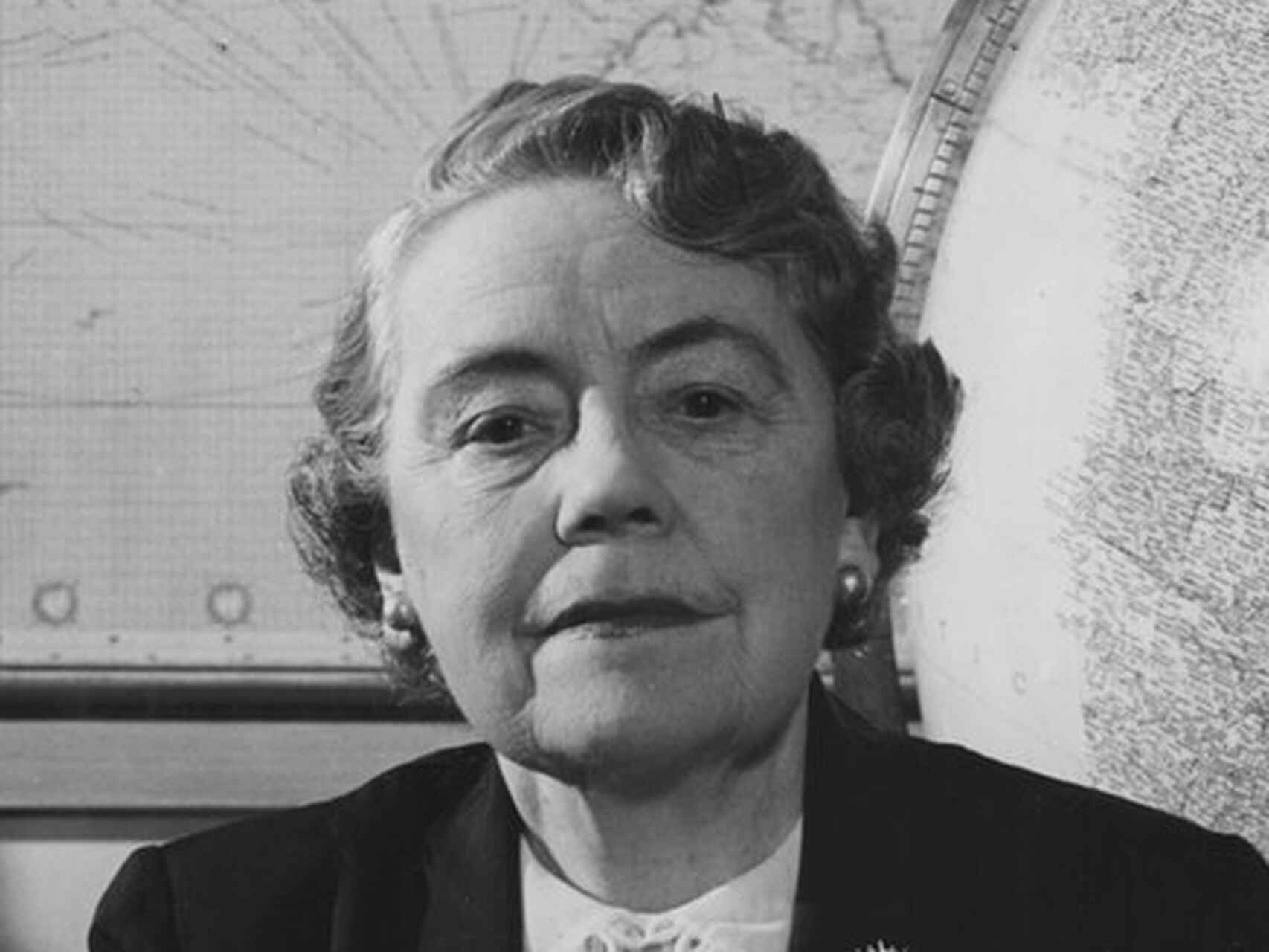
- Anne O'Hare McCormick in 1951
- Born: Anne O'Hare; May 16, 1880; Wakefield, Yorkshire, Great Britain
- Died: May 29, 1954 (aged 74); New York, United States
- Occupation: Journalist
- Years active: 1910–1954
- Known for: First woman recipient of a major Pulitzer Prize in journalism, first woman to join the editorial board of The New York Times

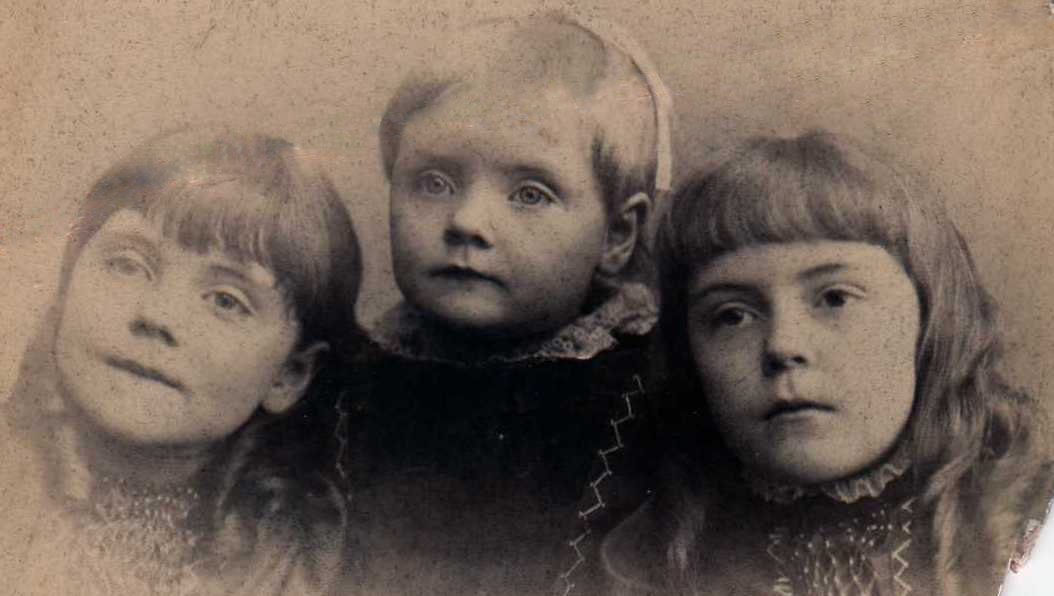
Anne O'Hare McCormick on right, about 10 years old, with sisters Mabel and Florence

Anne O'Hare McCormick (16 May 1880 – 29 May 1954) was an English-American journalist who worked as a foreign news correspondent for The New York Times. In an era where the field was almost exclusively "a man's world", she became the first woman to receive a Pulitzer Prize in a major journalism category, winning in 1937 for correspondence. In 1936, she became the first woman to be appointed to the editorial board of the Times, where she began a regular column on foreign policy in 1937.

Prior to World War II, McCormick interviewed almost all important world leaders, including Italian Prime Minister Benito Mussolini, Adolf Hitler, Joseph Stalin, Winston Churchill, and U.S. President Franklin D. Roosevelt. During the war, she served on the Advisory Committee on Postwar Foreign Policy, preparing foreign policy recommendations for President Roosevelt. With her foreign policy column, her position on the Times editorial board and her vast experience with interviewing world leaders, she became an influential political analyst in journalism along with Walter Lippmann and Dorothy Thompson, she became an influential political analyst in journalism.

== Early life ==
McCormick was born in Wakefield, England on 16 May 1880, to parents Thomas J. O'Hare and Theresa Beatrice (née Berry), the first of three children. She moved to the United States shortly after birth, and lived in Massachusetts before settling in Columbus, Ohio. Her father deserted the family in 1894. She was educated at the College of Saint Mary of the Springs, which was then a high school. When it became a four-year college, they gave her the first of her 17 honorary degrees. She never attended university.

After her graduation in 1898 as valedictorian, the family moved to Cleveland, where McCormick's mother sold her book, Songs at Twilight, and both of them became associate editors for the Catholic Universe Bulletin. Anne O'Hare married Dayton businessman Francis J. McCormick, Jr. (1872–1954), an importer and executive of the Dayton Plumbing Supply Company, on 14 September 1910. They settled in a Dayton house called "Hills and Dales," which they left in the 1930s to take up residence in the Gotham and then the Carlyle hotel in New York City, when not traveling in Europe. The import-export business of her husband and her career coincided well together. At first, she travelled with him until her assignments became too demanding to follow her husband. He retired and travelled with her while arranging all their affairs.

== Journalism career ==
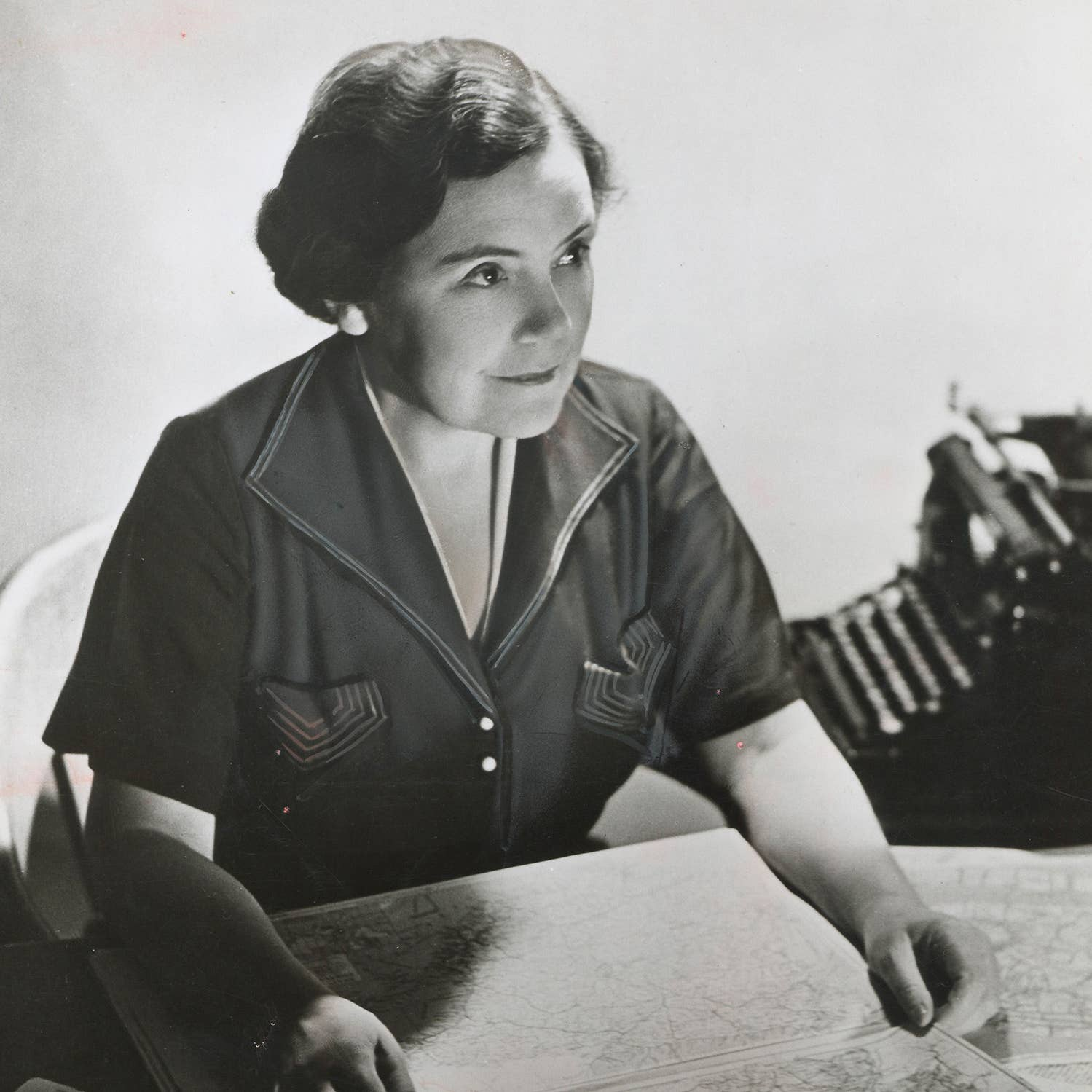
Anne O'Hare McCormick in 1941

In Dayton, McCormick began freelance writing and traveling to Europe on her husband's buying trips. Her work was first published by the Catholic World, The Reader Magazine, The Smart Set, The Bookman and The New York Times Magazine. In 1917 she wrote about the barriers to women in journalism. In 1921, at the age of 39, she asked Carr Van Anda if she could contribute articles to the New York Times, to cover stories not already investigated by the Times' foreign reporters. Van Anda accepted, and McCormick provided the first in-depth reports of the rise of Benito Mussolini and the Fascist movement in Italy. As described in a Current Biography article in 1940, "she was perhaps the first reporter to see that a young Milanese newspaper editor, lantern-jawed, hungry and insignificant, would attain world importance". The Times made McCormick a regular contributor in 1922. The next three years, she wrote for the Atlantic Monthly as well. Her husband's job led to frequent travels abroad, and her career as a journalist became more specialized. From 1925, she worked exclusively for the Times, until her death, except for one series of articles in the Ladies' Home Journal.

While credited with predicting Mussolini’s importance, as a New York Times special correspondent and later as the columnist for foreign politics, she "carried on a political love affair with an idealized Italy and its noble leader" the next two decades, "explaining to Americans the poetic beauties of the Italian landscape as well as the political beauties of Mussolini and Fascism," according to historian John Patrick Diggins. Although the New York Times editorially was less disposed to support Fascism than its correspondents like McCormick, she justified the illegal Italian invasion of Ethiopia, the sending of Italian "volunteers" to support the revolt of General Francisco Franco against Spain’s democratically elected government during the Spanish Civil War, and the Rome-Berlin Axis with Hitler’s Nazi Germany. "When Fascism collapsed in 1943," wrote Diggins, "she was less disappointed in Mussolini than in the 'apathetic' Italians who let him down." According to Diggins, McCormick “fell under the spell" of Mussolini and "gave the New York Times' readers not so much an analysis of Fascism as a fantasy portrait of a resurrected Italy."

In 1935, McCormick was named one of America's ten outstanding women by the suffragist Carrie Chapman Catt. The New York Times publisher, Adolph Ochs did not hire women reporters, so she remained a special correspondent until he died. The next publisher, Arthur Hays Sulzberger put her on the staff on June 1, 1936, as the first woman member of the editorial board, at a starting salary of $7,000 (equivalent to $162,410 in 2025) per year. When she died in 1954 she earned $30,624 (equivalent to $367,146 in 2025), more than all but four men in the paper's news staff. In her letter to Sulzberger accepting the position, she said she wouldn't "revert to 'woman's-point-of-view' stuff." Her dispatches from Europe that year were recognized with the Pulitzer Prize in 1937.

She began a regular column on foreign policy on February 1, 1937 which lasted until her death, titled "In Europe", later "Affairs in Europe" and eventually "Abroad". Over the years, in the 1920s and 1930s, McCormick obtained interviews with Italian Prime Minister Benito Mussolini, German leader Adolf Hitler in 1933, a six-hours session with Soviet Premier Joseph Stalin, Prime Minister of the United Kingdom Winston Churchill, French Popular Front leader and Prime Minister Léon Blum, Popes Pius XI and XII, and other world leaders. She recognized Hitler's popularity in Germany, while other US reporters were surprised at his election successes. Her assessment of the German leader triggered a flood of angry letters from readers of the Times, accusing her of being too soft on Hitler. "What I tried to do in my German dispatches was to indicate facts as they are in Germany and not as we'd like them to be," she explained. "Nobody can say [as did one outraged reader] that Hitler attained power through 'the defranchisement of a small minority.' What's worse, no one can say now that the majority of the German people don't stand behind him."

She built a special relationship with the president of the United States, Franklin D. Roosevelt, who "rejoiced in her company and repaid her with long, candid, private conversations." She interviewed him multiple times, from the start of his presidency in 1933 until the end in 1945, when he conceded his final interview to her. She supported his New Deal, defending it against right wing attacks, and Roosevelt’s push to establish the United Nations.

== Growing influence ==
In 1939, with World War II imminent, McCormick spent five months in 13 different nations, speaking with both political leaders and ordinary citizens in reporting the growing crisis. With her foreign policy column, her position on the Times editorial board and her vast experience with interviewing world leaders, she became an influential political analyst in journalism along with Walter Lippmann and Dorothy Thompson of the New York Herald Tribune and Arthur Krock of The New York Times, she became an influential political analyst in journalism. For her reporting during World War II, the War Department honored McCormick in 1946 with a campaign medal in recognition of "outstanding and conspicuous service with the armed forces under difficult and hazardous combat conditions." After the war she covered the Nuremberg trials and the Greek Civil War, and criticized John Foster Dulles for threatening to use the atom bomb before the Soviet Union had it.

McCormick was a staunch promotor of a Wilsonian world order modelled upon the United States as the ideal, liberal democratic state. She could be considered as one of the first prominent intellectual Cold Warriors, voicing anti-Bolshevik perceptions which were common at the State Department and which would become operational under the containment-oriented Truman Doctrine. She had published a negative assessment of the Soviet Union in her book The Hammer and the Scythe: Communist Russia Enters the Second Decade in 1928. She was reported to have spent time with President Roosevelt discussing policy and during the war she served on the Advisory Committee on Postwar Foreign Policy, a fourteen-member select government body that was secret at the time, which was involved in key foreign policy decisions on the postwar world made during 1942–1944, preparing recommendations for President Roosevelt.

After 1945, she lobbied Congressmen and women's groups, such as the Women's Action Committee for Lasting Peace, to support the Marshall Plan and military intervention in Greece and Turkey. McCormick was selected to represent the U.S. as a voting delegate to the United Nations Educational, Scientific, and Cultural Organization (UNESCO) at the United Nations in 1946 and 1948, where she advocated for the breakdown of international barriers to the western press for the benefit of Cold War propaganda programs.

== Death and legacy ==
McCormick died in New York on May 29, 1954, and is buried at Gate of Heaven cemetery in Hawthorne, NY. Her death was reported on the front page of the paper. According to reporter Julia Edwards, in the chapter 'Anne O'Hare McCormick and the Changing Times' in her book Women of the World: The Great Foreign Correspondents, McCormick "established a new standard for commentary on world affairs. Displacing generations of armchair pundits, she explored a world in conflict to answer the question - Why?" McCormick was modest about her journalistic achievements. “Crises were popping all over Europe at the time, so it isn’t strange that I bumped into a few,” she said. About her accomplishments and that of other contemporary newspaperwomen, she said: “We had tried hard not to talk—meaning too much—but just to sneak toward the city desk and the cable desk, and the editorial sanctum and even the publisher's office with masculine sang-froid.”

She preferred to stay in the limelight, not allowing that articles be written about her and not revealing any details of her private life, anxious as she was that personal fame could interfere with “the kind of impersonal and uncolored reporting ... on which the maintenance of a free press and therefore a free society depend.” She was not an advocate for feminist causes, but did encourage women to enter professional public life and advocated for women's talents to be utilized by government and business.

President Dwight D. Eisenhower called her "a truly great reporter, respected at home and abroad for her keen analysis and impartial presentation of the news developments of our day. She will be greatly missed by all the members of the newspaper profession and the hundreds of thousands of readers who followed her column in the New York Times." Times reporter James Reston said, "She put a glow on everything she wrote," and in 1999, 45 years after her death, said, "She is in my mind still." British Foreign Minister Anthony Eden called her a "champion of all good causes." French Foreign Minister Georges Bidault said "this woman... has left us at a moment when her courage and her clairvoyance would have been particularly precious for us."

== Honors ==
In 1945, the Altrusa International service club for executive and professional women presented McCormick with its distinguished service award.

In 1949, the American Irish Historical Society presented McCormick with a gold medal "in recognition of her eminence in journalism."

The New York Newspaper Women's Club, where McCormick served multiple terms as vice president, created the Anne O'Hare McCormick Journalism Scholarship in her memory. The scholarship is for female students at the Columbia University Graduate School of Journalism, with the first $500 memorial scholarship being awarded to Mary Kay Johnson of Wakefield, Rhode Island, in 1955.

McCormick received the Siena Medal from Theta Phi Alpha in 1941.

== Books ==
- Anne O'Hare McCormick (1920). St. Agnes Church. Cleveland. Ohio. An interpretation, Cleveland: The Martin Printing Company
- Anne O'Hare McCormick (1928). The Hammer and the Scythe: Communist Russia Enters the Second Decade, New York: Alfred A. Knopf
- Anne O'Hare McCormick, Marion Turner Sheehan (ed.) (1956). The World at Home. Selections from the Writings of Anne O'Hare McCormick, New York: Alfred A. Knopf
- Anne O'Hare McCormick, Marion Turner Sheehan (ed.) (1957). Vatican Journal 1921-1954, New York: Farrar, Straus & Cudahy

== Sources ==
- Berger, Meyer (1951). The story of the New York Times, 1851-1951. New York: Simon and Schuster.
- Block, Maxine, ed. (1940). Current Biography Yearbook 1940. New York, N.Y.: H.W. Wilson Company.
- Diggins, John Patrick (1972). Mussolini and fascism: the view from America. Princeton, N.J.: Princeton University Press. ISBN 0-691-00581-8. OCLC 1192887928.
- Drury, Augustus Waldo (1909). History of the city of Dayton and Montgomery County, Ohio. Chicago-Dayton: S.J. Clarke Publishing Company.
- Edwards, Julia (1989). Women of the World: The Great Foreign Correspondents. New York, N.Y.: Ivy Books. ISBN 0-8041-0491-3.
- Edy, Carolyn M. (2016). The Woman War Correspondent, The U.S Military, and The Press, 1846–1947. Lanham, MD: Lexington Books. ISBN 978-1-498-53927-2. OCLC 958798216.
- Fischer, Heinz Dietrich; Fischer, Erika J., eds. (1987). International Reporting, 1928-1985: From the Activities of the League of Nations to Present-day Global Problems, Volume 1. München, London, New York, Oxford, Paris: K.G. Saur Verlag KG. ISBN 3-598-30171-5.
- Hunter, Yvonne (August 2009). Cold columns: Anne O'Hare McCormick and the origins of the cold war in the New York Times (1920-1954) (Research Paper thesis). Nipissing University.
- Migone, Gian Giacomo (2015). The United States and Fascist Italy: The Rise of American Finance in Europe. New York, N.Y.: Cambridge University Press. ISBN 978-1-107-00245-6.
- Robertson, Nan C. (1992). The Girls in The Balcony : Women, Men, and The New York Times. New York, N.Y.: Random House. ISBN 0-394-58452-X. OCLC 24065184.
- Shoup, Laurence H.; Minter, William (1977). Imperial Brain Trust: The Council on Foreign Relations and United States Foreign Policy. New York: Monthly Review Press. ISBN 0-85345-393-4.
- Sicherman, Barbara; Hurd Green, Carol, eds. (1980). Notable American Women: The Modern Period, a Biographical Dictionary, Volume 4. Cambridge, MA & London: Harvard University Press. ISBN 0-674-62732-6.
- "Elizabeth A. McCormick", Ohio History Central, July 1, 2005.
- Papers of Anne O'Hare McCormick at the New York Public Library
- Archives of Catholic Universe Bulletin at the Catholic Diocese of Cleveland
