= The Reader (disambiguation) =

The Reader (Der Vorleser) is a novel by Bernhard Schlink from 1995

The Reader may also refer to:

- The Reader (2008 film), a drama film by Stephen Daldry, based on Bernhard Schlink's novel
- The Reader (1988 film), a French film by Michel Deville, Raymond Jean's novel La Lectrice.
- The Reader (magazine), a Liverpool-based literary magazine
- The Reader Magazine, a quarterly free magazine in Redlands, California
- The Reader (newspaper), an alternative newspaper in Omaha, Nebraska
- The Reader, the first book in Traci Chee's Sea of Ink and Gold trilogy, published in 2016
- A Young Girl Reading, a painting by Jean-Honoré Fragonard
- The Reader (weekly) (1863–1866), a short-lived British literary publication

== See also ==
- Reader (disambiguation)
