= Martha Coman =

American journalist

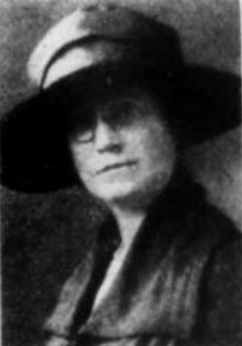
- Martha Coman, from a 1922 publication
- Born: 1872; Wisconsin
- Died: November 27, 1959; New York, New York, U.S.
- Occupation(s): Journalist, publicist

Martha Day Coman (1872 – November 27, 1959) was an American journalist. She was one of the first women reporters at the New York Herald, and the first president of the Newswomen's Club of New York.

== Early life and education ==
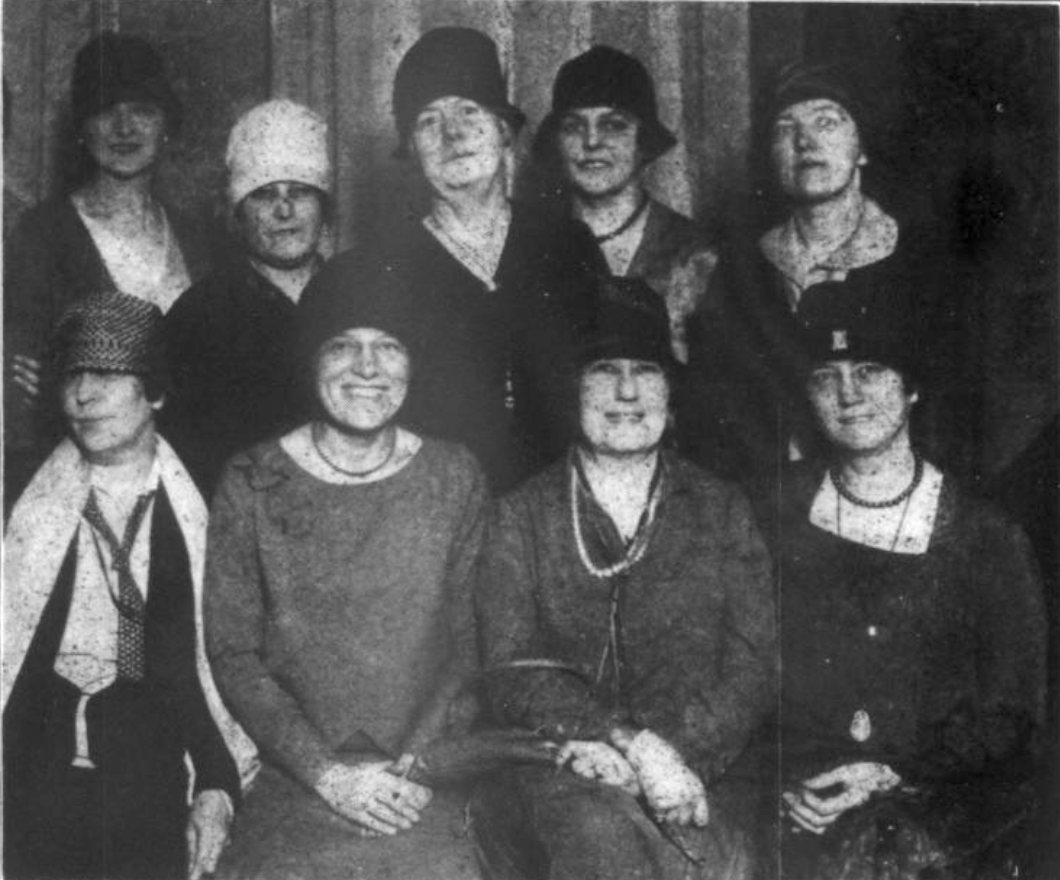
Members of the Newspaper Women's Club of New York in 1927: Front row, left-to-right: Helen Rowland, Emma Bugbee, Josephine Ober, and Martha Coman; back row, left-to-right: Charlotte McLevedge, Rose Therese Nagel, Marie L. Darrach, Madeline Riordan, and Olive Hurlbut.

Coman was born in Wisconsin, and raised in Portland, Oregon, the daughter of Edmund B. Coman and Marian W. Sexton Coman. Her father was born in Ireland. She graduated from Stanford University.

== Career ==
Coman was one of the first women reporters at the New York Herald. In 1916, she covered Charles Evans Hughes' presidential campaign. She reported on fashion, suffrage, and women in careers, but she also covered the World Series, and especially Babe Ruth, in 1921. She was the first president of the Newspaper Women's Club of New York when it was founded in 1922. She joined Theodora Bean's T-Bean Syndicate in 1925, and was editor of the weekly Scarsdale Inquirer. She became a publicist at Harper's Publishing in 1929. She also worked as a publicist for Smith College. She remained active in leadership with the Newspaper Women's Club of New York through the 1930s, as its treasurer.

== Publications ==
- "The Art of Camping: A Woman's View" (1902)
- "Flowers a Bride Should Carry" (1902)
- "Swimming Girls Making Big Splash in the World of Sports" (1922)
- "Faith, Hope, and Parity for the Seven Colleges" (1930)

== Personal life and legacy ==
Coman died in 1959, in her eighties, in New York City. The Newswomen's Club of New York gives the annual Martha Coman Front Page Award for Best New Journalist as part of its Front Page Awards.
