= Theodora Bean =

American journalist (1871–1926)

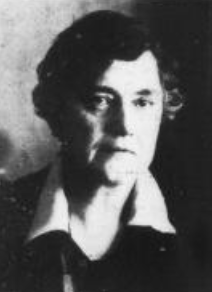
- Theodora Bean, from a 1926 publication
- Born: Edna Belle Bean; March 26, 1871; Anoka, Minnesota, U.S.
- Died: August 5, 1926 (age 55); New York City
- Occupation: Journalist

Theodora Bean (March 26, 1871 – August 5, 1926), born Edna Belle Bean, was an American journalist and suffragist. She was a founder and president of the Newspaper Women's Club of New York, and started her own news syndicate, the T-Bean Syndicate, shortly before her death.

== Early life and education ==
Bean was born in Anoka, Minnesota, the daughter of Martin Van Buren Bean and Louisa Jane McFarlan Bean. Her mother was from Canada; her father was from Maine. Her father was a Union Army veteran of the American Civil War, and ran a hardware store. She attended Carleton College briefly, then moved to Chicago to begin a career in journalism.

== Career ==
=== Journalism ===
Bean was a reporter at the Chicago Daily News, and in that job interviewed Carrie Nation and covered women's clubs and sports. She moved to New York City, and was Sunday editor for the Morning Telegraph; she also worked for the Evening Telegram. She profiled British singer Clara Butt in 1913, and interviewed artist Beatrice Wood in 1917. She was a founding member of the Newspaper Women's Club of New York in 1922, and was president of the Club at the time of her death. She mentored Louella Parsons in the details of newspaper work. In 1925 she began the T-Bean Syndicate, and recruited many fellow journalists to contribute, including Martha Coman, Benjamin De Casseres, Alice Rohe, and Delight Evans; her death in 1926 ended that venture.

=== Suffrage and other work ===
Bean marched in a unit with other women writers, including Mary Hunter Austin, Grace Gallatin Seton Thompson, Charlotte Perkins Gilman, Katherine Leckie and Kate Jordan, in a 1911 suffrage parade, and she interviewed Carrie Chapman Catt for the Morning Telegraph in 1912. In 1915, she and others (including Fola La Follette and Alice Duer Miller) wore sandwich boards featuring suffrage arguments on the New York subway, to counter anti-suffrage advertising posters on the cars. She appeared as herself in a silent film, Our Mutual Girl No. 22 (1914); Arthur Conan Doyle also made a cameo in that film.

== Publications ==
- "Bearding the Governor" (Harper's Weekly, 1908)
- "Classic Grecian Knot the Latest Coiffure for Newport Belles and Other Fashion Leaders of 1908" (1908)
- "Hobble skirt's Doom Foreseen; Be Patient, Ye Critical Men" (1911)
- "The Decline of Courtesy" (1912)
- "The Field, the Salon, and Politics; A Fact Story of a Remarkable Woman" (1912, profile of Anne de Rochechouart de Mortemart)
- "Anna Case's Own Story; From Church Choir to Grand Opera" (1912)
- "Too Tall for Opera—Butt!" (1913)
- "Do Motherhood and Art Agree?" (1913, a profile of Louise Homer)
- "'Women! Go to Work! Commands Alda Gatti" (1913)

== Personal life ==
"She was handsome, imperious, and abhorred sentiment," Ishbel Ross recalled of Bean in 1936. "She smoked cigars, carried a walking stick, and had a passion for detective stories." Bean lived with writer and actress Marjorie Patterson. Bean died in 1926, at the age of 55, after a surgery. On the occasion, Nellie Revell wrote in Variety, "It is a loss that has descended with crushing force upon me and all her other personal friends."
