= Reader (surname) =

Reader is an English surname. Notable people with the surname include the following:

- D. J. Reader (born 1984), American football defensive tackle for the Cincinnati Bengals of the National Football League
- Brian Reader (born 1989), Arena football quarterback
- Brian Reader (1939–2023), British criminal
- Colin Reader (born ?), English geologist
- Dickie Reader (1890–1974), English footballer
- Eddi Reader (born 1959), Scottish singer
- Felix Reader (1850–1911), German-born Australian chemist and amateur botanist
- Francis Reader (born 1965), Scottish musician, band-member of "The Trash Can Sinatras"
- Ralph Reader (1903–1982), British director and producer
- Richard Reader Harris (KC) (1847–1909), English barrister and Pentecostal Christian
- Richard Reader Harris (politician) (1913–2009), MP, English politician
- Ted Reader, Canadian chef

== See also ==
- Reader (disambiguation)
- Reeder (surname)
