= Josephine Robb Ober =

American journalist

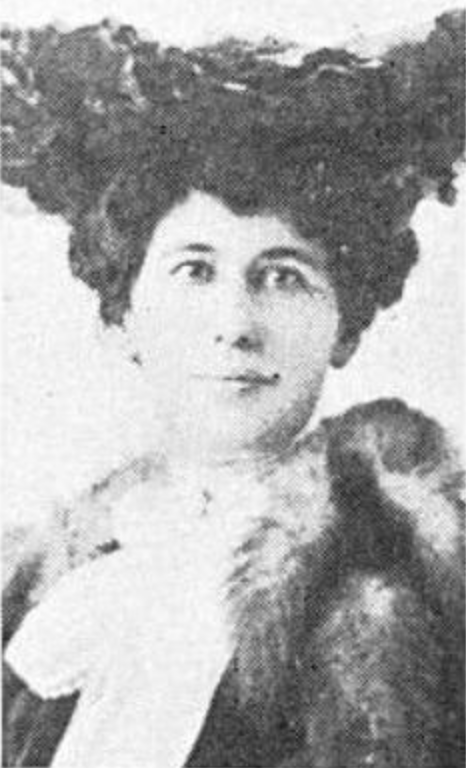
- Josephine Robb, later Ober, from a 1904 publication
- Born: November 26, 1875; New York, New York, U.S.
- Died: April 7, 1952 (age 76); New York, New York, U.S.
- Occupation: Journalist

Josephine Robb Ober (November 26, 1875 – April 7, 1952) was an American journalist and publicist. She was society editor of The New York World from 1904 to 1931, and president of the Newspaper Women's Club of New York from 1929 to 1930.

== Early life and education ==
Robb was born in New York City, the daughter of Joseph Watkins Robb and Julia A. McBride Robb. Her father was a member of the New York Produce Exchange.

== Career ==
Ober worked as a freelance reporter as a young woman. She was "one of the prominent newspaper women of New York", as the society and drama editor at the New York World from 1904 to 1931. She was president of the Newspaper Women's Club of New York from 1929 to 1930. She also worked in advertising, and as a publicist. She did publicity for suffrage events. During World War II, she sold war bonds, and was cited by the United States Department of the Treasury for her contributions in that effort.

== Publications ==
- "'Rip Van Winkle' as He Is At Home" (1898)
- "Latest Summer Costumes" (1901)
- "Fall and Winter Costumes" (1902)

== Personal life ==
Robb married patent attorney Frank Somes Ober on his deathbed in 1912; he died the next day. She died in 1952, at her home in New York City, at the age of 76.
