= Reeder =

Reeder may refer to:

- Reeder (surname)

== Places ==
- Reeder Township, Anderson County, Kansas
- Reeder Township, Missaukee County, Michigan
- Reeder, North Dakota
- Reeder, Manitoba

== See also ==
- Reader (disambiguation)
