= Three on a Honeymoon (1934 film) =

- Theatrical release poster
- Directed by: James Tinling
- Screenplay by: Edward T. Lowe Jr. Raymond Van Sickle
- Based on: Promenade Deck by Ishbel Ross
- Produced by: John Stone
- Starring: Sally Eilers; ZaSu Pitts; Henrietta Crosman; Charles Starrett; Irene Hervey; Johnny Mack Brown
- Cinematography: Arthur Arling; Joseph Valentine
- Edited by: Alex Troffey
- Production company: Fox Film Corporation
- Distributed by: Fox Film Corporation
- Release date: March 23, 1934
- Running time: 65 minutes
- Country: United States
- Language: English

Three on a Honeymoon is a 1934 American Pre-Code comedy film directed by James Tinling, written by Edward T. Lowe Jr. and Raymond Van Sickle, and starring Sally Eilers, ZaSu Pitts, Henrietta Crosman, Charles Starrett, Irene Hervey and Johnny Mack Brown. It is based on the 1932 novel Promenade Deck by Ishbel Ross. The film was released on March 23, 1934, by Fox Film Corporation.

== Cast ==
- Sally Eilers as Joan Foster
- ZaSu Pitts as Alice Mudge
- Henrietta Crosman as 'Ma' Gillespie
- Charles Starrett as Dick Charlton
- Irene Hervey as Millicent Wells
- Johnny Mack Brown as Chuck Wells
- Russell Simpson as Ezra MacDuff
- Cornelius Keefe as Phil Lang
- Edward Earle as First Officer
- Howard Lally as Third Officer
- Wini Shaw as Singer
