= Cut Out + Keep =

Online craft community

- Available in: English
- Website: cutoutandkeep.net
- Registration: Yes
- Users: 198,000
- Launched: 2007
- Current status: Active

Cut Out + Keep is a recipe, DIY and craft tutorial-sharing website established in 2007. Members create tutorials on the site of their recipes, crafts and handmade items. The site currently hosts over 70,000 projects as of March 2015.

== History ==
While at university, Cat Morley began sharing tutorials for her crafts, first on WordPress, and later on a website built by her partner, Tom Waddington. After sharing around 250 projects, the site software was updated to allow any other member to share their own tutorials. Since then, over 180,000 members have shared around 70,000 projects.

== Coverage ==
The site is monetized through Google AdSense, who made a video featuring the sites founders. Interviews and features on the site have been published in Company Magazine, DC Thomson's Ruby Loves magazine, The Reader the Edinburgh Evening News, as well as a profile of the site in Mollie Makes: Making It. It is frequently mentioned as a source for craft inspiration across multiple publications

A book, "Cut Out + Keep: Around the USA in 50 Projects" was published by Laurence King in February 2015, covering the founders' trip through the 50 US states alongside craft tutorials.
