= Alice Hughes (journalist) =

American journalist

- Hughes in 1937
- Born: November 1, 1898; Manchester, New Hampshire, U.S.
- Died: June 20, 1977 (aged 78); White Plains, New York, U.S.
- Other name: Alice Hughes-Hall
- Education: Columbia University Graduate School of Journalism
- Occupation: Journalist
- Years active: c. 1923–1967
- Known for: "A Woman's New York" fashion column
- Spouse: Leonard Hall

Alice Hughes (November 1, 1898 – June 20, 1977) was an American journalist, known for her syndicated column "A Woman's New York" and for interviewing Leon Trotsky in Turkey in 1933.

== Biography ==
=== Early years ===
Hughes was born in 1898 in Manchester, New Hampshire, per multiple government documents. She referred to Manchester as her hometown, and wrote about growing up there with her two brothers and two sisters as the middle child.

Hughes was a 1921 graduate of the Columbia University Graduate School of Journalism. She worked as an associate editor at Detective Story Magazine for six months. Her first newspaper column, "Mary Jane's Household Guide", appeared by 1923 in the New York American. When the column was not successful, she left the paper and did fashion advertising for some department stores, including R. H. Macy & Co.

=== Fashion reporting ===
In 1928, Hughes began writing a fashion column, "A Woman's New York", for the New York World-Telegram. Hughes, and her column, later moved to the New York American. She authored the column for more than 30 years, during which it was distributed by King Features Syndicate. Writer Ishbel Ross stated that Hughes "wrought a miraculous change in the publicity methods of the department stores", which came from Hughes' "idea for a supporting news column for shops, such as books and the theater had". "Almost immediately the column caught on" and Hughes "would mention a shop and the next day crowds swarmed in."

Hughes was often on radio, as early as 1934 when she was a regular commentator for Magazine of the Air on WOR (AM) along with other New York-based journalists and writers such as Heywood Broun, Gilbert Seldes, and Sigmund Spaeth. Hughes also edited a weekly page of beauty news, "You Can Be Beautiful", for the New York American starting in 1936. (Note: The New York American merged with the New York Evening Journal in 1937; the resulting publication was known as the New York Journal-American.)

Hughes wrote her "A Woman's New York" column into the 1960s, with King Features Syndicate distributing it, sometimes under the title "Alice Hughes Reports", until it was finally discontinued in December 1967.

=== International reporting ===
Hughes traveled extensively prior to World War II, visiting and writing about Japan, Manchuria, Italy, and Russia.

In 1933, Hughes interviewed Leon Trotsky in Prinkipo, Turkey, one of several locations he lived in following his exile from the Soviet Union in 1929. Hughes' account of their meeting, which appeared in various American newspapers in mid-August, noted that they spoke in French, as Trotsky said his English was rusty. Trotsky explained that he spent his days fishing, writing, hunting, and thinking; he discussed spearing for lobsters in the Sea of Marmora in some detail. In discussing economics, he opined that "the end of capitalism is in sight". Commenting on the Four-Power Pact, Trotsky said Hitler was using it to gain help from Italy, but Trotsky felt Hitler lacked the "intelligence and ability" of Mussolini. When Hughes asked Trotsky about errors made by the Soviet regime, Trotsky said he would provide her with an answer in writing, which he did, stating in part that "The principal errors of the ruling faction (they are very grave) flow from the fact that it attempts to substitute the bureaucratic apparatus for the initiative, creativeness and criticism of the toiling masses." (Note: Trotsky's own notes of the interview used slightly different wording: "The fundamental errors of the ruling faction (they are very grave) flow from the fact that it is attempting, by means of the bureaucratic apparatus, to replace the initiative, creativity and critical thinking of the working masses.")

=== Personal life ===
Ishbel Ross described Hughes:

She is slim, dark, still in her manner. Her face is touched with melancholy. She parts her hair severely in the middle, speaks thoughtfully, surveys the world with slightly tilted eyes. But her somber air is deceptive. She is alert, ingratiating, vivid in her interests, optimistic in her outlook. She believes that good fortune comes to those who believe completely in what they are doing. She herself moves in the mystical aura of success.

Hughes was a friend of French-born hat-maker Lilly Daché, and is mentioned several times in Daché's autobiography, Talking Through My Hats. Hughes was evidently a teetotaler, with a "notorious" dislike of alcohol.

Hughes was married twice, first immediately after she left college, which ended in divorce, and later to Leonard Hall, a drama critic. In 1935, Hughes and Hall adopted a son; it is unclear what became of him. In an August 1944 column, Hughes mentioned "Jake, my month-old foster son"; he was mentioned by Hughes numerous times, as late as 1962. Hall died in 1946 at the couple's apartment in Manhattan, aged 50. At the time of his death, he was working on a book about dancer Gilda Gray. Hughes died in 1977 in White Plains, New York, aged 78. The obituary noted a brother, a sister, and her foster son as surviving immediate family.
