= Reader =

A reader is a person who reads. It may also refer to:

== Computing and technology ==
- Adobe Reader (now Adobe Acrobat), a PDF reader
- Bible Reader for Palm, a discontinued PDA application
- A card reader, for extracting data from various forms of card-shaped media
- An e-reader, a device or software for viewing e-books
  - Amazon Kindle
  - Microsoft Reader
  - Sony Reader
- Foxit Reader, a multilingual PDF tool
- Google Reader, a discontinued web app for handling RSS/Atom feeds
- K-NFB Reader, a handheld electronic reading device for the blind
- Lisp reader, the parser function in the Lisp programming language
- Microsoft Fingerprint Reader
- Newsreader (Usenet), for reading newsgroup posts
- Nintendo e-Reader, a device to read paper card media for the Game Boy Advance
- Reader, an off-line content viewing feature of Apple's Safari web browser
- Screen reader, a software application that attempts to identify and interpret what is being displayed on the screen

== Education and literature ==
- Basal reader, a book used to teach reading and associated skills to schoolchildren
  - McGuffey Readers, a well-known early series of such books
- Anthology, a book of selections of writing, usually by many authors
  - Uncle John's Bathroom Reader, a series of books containing trivia and short essays on miscellaneous topics
- Reader-response criticism, a literary theory, primarily German and American
- The Reader, a 1995 novel by Bernhard Schlink

== Newspapers and magazines ==
- Chicago Reader, a newsweekly
- Duzhe, (translated Reader(s)), a Chinese magazine
- High Plains Reader, an independent weekly tabloid
- Los Angeles Reader, a defunct weekly paper
- The Reader (magazine), a literary quarterly published by the University of Liverpool
- San Diego Reader, a weekly newspaper in San Diego, California
- Utne Reader, a periodical
- Weekly Reader (formerly My Weekly Reader), an educational magazine for children
- The Reader (newspaper), a weekly in Omaha, Nebraska
- Readers' Guide to Periodical Literature, a reference guide to articles in magazines and journals

== Occupations ==
- A publisher's reader, also called a first reader
- Reader (liturgy), a person charged with reading scripture in church
- Reader (Christian Science Church) (also First Reader or Second Reader), a person who conducts services in a Christian Science church
- Reader (Anglican Church)
- Reader (academic rank), in British education the position between senior (or principal) lecturer and professor
- Reader (Inns of Court), a senior barrister of the Inns of Court in London elected to deliver lectures on a particular legal topic
- Reader, a practitioner of cartomancy, fortune-telling using a deck of cards

== Places ==
- Reader, Arkansas
  - Reader Railroad, a tourist railroad
- Reader, West Virginia

== Other uses ==
- The Reader (2008 film), based on the novel
- Plate reader (or microplate reader), a laboratory instrument
- "Readers", a slang term for reading glasses
- Readers, a deck of marked cards

== See also ==
- Reader (surname)
- Reeder (disambiguation)
- The Reader (disambiguation)
