= Readership =

Readership may refer to:

- The group of readers of a particular publication or writer: their target audience
- The total number of readers of a particular publication (newspaper, magazine, book), as proxy-measured by web/app views or print circulation
- The occupational position of a reader, particularly as an academic rank
