= Frank L. Kluckhohn =

American author and journalist

- Born: November 24, 1907; St. Paul, Minnesota
- Died: October 2, 1970 (aged 62); King's Daughters Hospital
- Citizenship: United States of America
- Education: University of Minnesota; Centro de Estudios Historicos
- Occupation: Journalist
- Writing career
- Notable works: The Mexican Challenge (1939); America Listen, a report to the nation on a threat to its survival (1961); Naked Rise of Communism (1962); What's Wrong with United States Foreign Policy (1963); Lyndon's Legacy (1964); The Inside on L.B.J. (1964); The Drew Pearson Story (1967); The Man Who Kept the Peace (A Study of John Foster Dulles)(1968); The Real Eisenhower (1969)

Frank L. Kluckhohn (November 24, 1907 – October 2, 1970) was an author and journalist.

== Career ==
He studied at the University of Minnesota and Spain's Centro de Estudios Historicos. Kluckhohn began his journalistic career with The St. Paul Dispatch as a sports reporter while still a student, later becoming a general reporter at the paper.

Joining The New York Times, he served as the newspaper's correspondent reporting from over 70 countries between 1929 and 1947.

Reporting on the Spanish Civil War, Kluckhohn was first to report on the German intervention when aircrews entered the hotel he was in at Seville.

Kluckhohn reported on the activities of President Franklin D. Roosevelt in the year before the Pearl Harbor attack.

During the Second World War, he reported from both the European and Pacific Theatres, including coverage of the Battle of Leyte Gulf.

Following the surrender of Japan in 1945, Kluckhohn along with Hugh Baillie, became the first American journalists to interview Emperor Hirohito. Kluckhohn did not bow to the Emperor but shook his hand. He was told that he was possibly the first person to do this in 2600 years.

Secretary of War Robert P. Patterson honored war correspondents, including Kluckhohn, at an event in Washington, on November 23, 1946.

After the war, Kluckhohn covered events in South America between 1945 and 1947 with particular focus on Argentina and Juan Perón.

Leaving the newspaper business, he then became an advisor to the Secretary of Defense (1948), IBM World Trade Corporation executive (1950) and handled publicity for the Republican National Committee (1952). Continuing his political activity, he was an advisor to the Department of State (1955–61) and was on the staff of Congress (1961).

Kluckhohn acted as director of CEASE (Committee to End Aid to the Soviet Enemy) and the Press Ethics Committee. The committee looked to root our bias in news reporting and editing.

He died at King's Daughters Hospital following a traffic accident.
