= Poems in the Waiting Room =

Small UK arts in health charity

Poems in the Waiting Room (PitWR) is a U.K.-based and registered arts in health charity. The main aim of the charity is to supply short collections of poems for patients in National Health Service General Practice waiting rooms to read while waiting to see their doctor. The aim is to promote poetry, and to make the paient's wait more pleasant. The service is free to the waiting rooms and general practice managers, and is supported by grants and donations. Prior to the Covid-19 pandemic the poems were presented as A4 sized three-fold cards typically reproducing between six and eight poems. Batches of cards were printed and distributed to waiting rooms four times a year. From 2021 the charity has instead published poetry collections only on its website.

A key consideration for the charity is the selection of poems. Guidelines for the selection of poems have been devised with this in mind, and with help from a consultant psychiatrist as well as from poets. To quote the Editor "In a patient centred health service, poetry arts in health too needs to be patient centred. The readers are patients – the worried well and the worried sick. The poems selected draw from the springs of well-being. In time of trouble, a measure of comfort is welcome". The selection of poems is therefore different from, for example, the poetry that patients may themselves write as writing therapy. Poems selected for inclusion in PiTWR collections are a mix of contemporary work and poems from the canon of English poetry. Translations of poems from other traditions are also included. The essential is that they all contain positive images of hope, home, security, safe journey and arrival, beauty and transcendence, love and loving. The approach is indeed more akin to bibliotherapy rather than art therapy. Submissions from poets are encouraged, and a set of guidelines is provided to indicate the sort of poetry that meets the need of the charity.

In addition to the selection, production and distribution of the poetry cards the charity has also undertaken research into the cost effectiveness of the scheme, and supports related arts in health initiatives. Collaborative work with other arts in health or literature based organisations, such as The Reader (magazine) is actively pursued.

== Organisation ==
Poems in the Waiting Room, Registered Charity (No. 1099033), is incorporated as a company limited by guarantee (04836215) and is managed by the trustee body and executive committee, providing professional advice in literary and executive editing, production and distribution of the poetry cards.

The executive committee has been expanded since the retirement and death in 2012 of the founder, Michael Lee, formerly Executive Chairman. The Chair was held until September 2024 by the late Serge Lourie who took over on the retirement of Wendy French; Edmund Lee is Honorary Chief Executive; Helen Lee is Honorary Secretary and became Editor on the retirement of Isobel Montgomery Campbell; Ciorsdan Glass is Head of Digital; Elizabeth Mary Anne Patience Consultant Analytical Psychologist; Michael Sheridan Stone is Director of PitWR Worldwide.

The UK-based charity has attracted wider attention, and encourages collaboration with projects set up in other countries, where these projects adopt the same editorial policy. Examples include Poems in the Waiting Room New Zealand established in 2008, based at Dunedin.
