= Edwin Leland James =

American journalist & war correspondent (1890-1951)

- Born: Edward Leland James; June 25, 1890; Irvington, Virginia, U.S.
- Died: December 3, 1951 (aged 61); New York City, New York
- Education: Randolph–Macon College
- Occupations: Journalist; War correspondent
- Years active: 1910–1951
- Spouse: Simone James (née Tremoulet)

Edwin Leland James (June 25, 1890 – December 3, 1951) was an American journalist and war correspondent who covered World War I and served as the chief European correspondent for The New York Times after the war. He worked as the paper's managing editor from 1932 until his death, during which time he continued to cover international affairs.

James was born in Irvington, Virginia in 1890. He received a bachelor's degree from Randolph–Macon College in 1909. From 1910 to 1912 he worked as a reporter for The Baltimore Sun, and went on to join the Pittsburgh Dispatch as an assistant news editor. In 1915 he joined The New York Times as a copy editor and quickly became a reporter. He was appointed as the Paris correspondent and covered the war in Europe.

After the war he worked as the Times' chief European correspondent and reported from across the continent. He covered the rise of fascism in Italy and conducted several interviews with Benito Mussolini. In 1932 he became managing editor and expanded the New York Times International Edition.

He was the first cousin of Russell Baker's mother.
