= Hugh Baillie =

American journalist (1890–1966)

- Born: December 23, 1890
- Died: March 1, 1966 (aged 75)
- Education: University of Southern California
- Occupation: Journalist
- Employer: United Press Associations
- Known for: President of UP, 1935–1955

Hugh Baillie (October 23, 1890 – March 1, 1966) was an American journalist best known as the head of UP (United Press Associations), the leading rival to the Associated Press. As president 1935-1955, he was an overall charge of business operations, and dealings with his correspondents and subscribing newspapers. Baillie was the son of a prominent journalist in New York, and joined UP in 1915 after attending the University of Southern California. He personally interviewed top European leaders in the coming of World War II, including Adolf Hitler, Benito Mussolini, and Neville Chamberlain. He covered the American invasion of Sicily in 1943, and the Belgian campaign in 1944, in which he was wounded.

After the war Baillie continued with his interviews of famous world leaders, such as the heads of Japan, China, and the Soviet Union. Baillie was a leader in promoting freedom of news dissemination and called in 1944 for an open system of news sources and transmission, and a minimum of government regulation of the news. His proposals were aired at the Geneva Conference on Freedom of Information in 1948, but were blocked by the Soviets and by France. He strongly supported General Douglas MacArthur and his conduct of the Korean War, making sure that his reporters and editors covered it thoroughly.

At the time of his retirement, UP had 2,900 clients in the United States, and 1,500 abroad.

== Primary sources ==
- Hugh Baillie. High Tension: The Recollections of Hugh Baillie (Harper, 1959)
