= Dickie Reader =

English footballer

Personal information
- Full name: Richard Reader
- Date of birth: 8 November 1890
- Place of birth: Derby, England
- Date of death: 1974 (aged 83–84)
- Position: Winger

Senior career*
Years	Team	Apps	(Gls)
1910–1911	Belper Town		
1911–1912	Ripley Athletic		
1912–1913	Leicester Fosse	0	(0)
1913	Ripley Athletic		
1913–1914	Derby County	4	(0)
1914–1922	Bristol City	51	(4)
1922–1923	Luton Town	7	(0)
Total		62	(4)
- * Club domestic league appearances and goals

Richard Reader (8 November 1890 – 1974) was an English footballer who played in the Football League for Bristol City, Derby County and Luton Town.
