= Front Page Award =

The Front Page Award is an award given by the Newswomen's Club of New York to honor journalistic achievement by women. It has been given annually since 1937.

The awards were initially divided into three divisions – straight reporting assignments for a single story or a series of articles; regular features exclusively in the feminine field, including fashion columns, or sewing or cooking departments; any column or feature, including editorials, written consistently by a woman. Broadcast and magazine categories were added in 1972. In 2024, 50 awards were presented at the Front Page Awards, alongside the Front Page Award for Journalist of the Year.
