= Newswomen's Club of New York =

Organization

- The Newswomen's Club of New York
- Abbreviation: NYNC (formerly NYNWC)
- Predecessor: New York Newspaper Woman's Club
- Formation: March 22, 1922 (formally established); proposed 1888
- Founder: Martha Coman, Jane Dixon, Theodora Bean, Emma Bugbee, Ann Dunlap, Josephine Ober, Jane Grant, Louella Parsons (among others)
- Founded at: Hotel Vanderbilt, New York City, New York, U.S.
- Type: Nonprofit
- Legal status: Active
- Headquarters: New York City, New York, U.S. (office in the National Arts Club)
- Location: New York City, U.S.
- Region served: New York City metropolitan area
- Services: Annual Front Page Award, scholarships for female journalism students, networking opportunities, programs and events
- Members: 220 (2015)
- Key people: Eleanor Roosevelt, Helen Rogers Reid, Anne O'Hare McCormick (former members); Martha Coman (first president); Joan O'Sullivan, Rosalind Massow (former presidents)
- Award: Front Page Award (presented annually)
- Formerly called: New York Newspaper Woman's Club (until 1971)

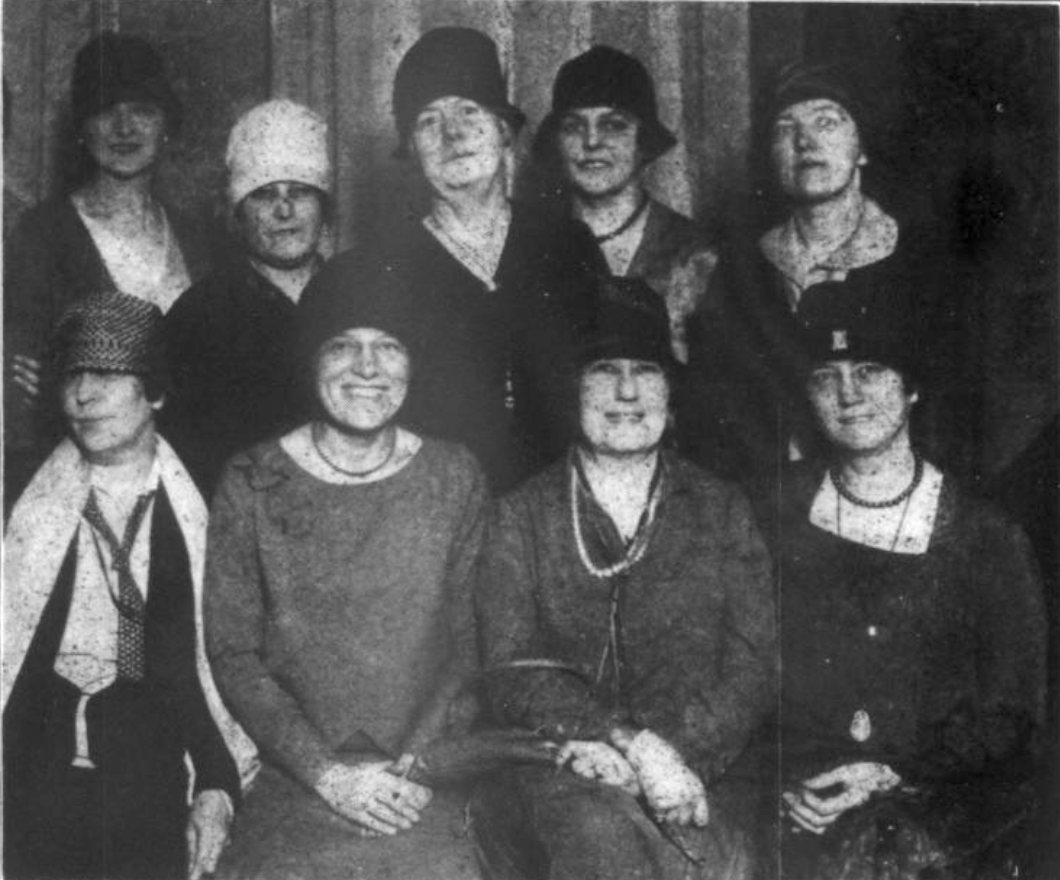
Members of the Newspaper Women's Club of New York in 1927. Front row, left-to-right: Helen Rowland, Emma Bugbee, Josephine Ober, and Martha Coman; back row, left-to-right: Charlotte McLevedge, Rose Therese Nagel, Marie L. Darrach, Madeline Riordan, and Olive Hurlbut.

The Newswomen's Club of New York is a nonprofit organization that focuses on women working in the media in the New York City metropolitan area. Founded in 1922 as the New York Newspaper Woman's Club, it included Eleanor Roosevelt, Helen Rogers Reid and Anne O'Hare McCormick among its membership; it changed its name in 1971 to include members working in magazines and broadcast media. The organization presents its Front Page Award annually to honor the most prominent achievements by women in journalism.

== History ==
American newspapers hired large numbers of female journalists in 1919–1920 to cover the women's suffrage movement, but after the passage of the Nineteenth Amendment, many were demoted to the society pages or let go. This led several women to plan a group that would fight for the rights of female journalists.

The New York Newspaper Women's Club was started by 32 women who met at the Hotel Vanderbilt on March 8, 1922, and formally began two weeks later with the swearing in of officers and the adoption of a constitution. The founding officers were Martha Coman of The New York Herald as president, Jane Dixon of the New York Telegram as vice president, Theodora Bean of The Morning Telegraph as treasurer, Emma Bugbee of The New York Tribune as recording secretary, Ann Dunlap of the New York American as corresponding secretary, Josephine Ober of the New York World as chair of the membership committee, Jane Grant of The New York Times as chair of the house committee, and Louella Parsons of The Morning Telegraph as chair of the publicity committee. The first board of directors consisted of Parsons, Grant, and Esther Coster of the Brooklyn Eagle. The annual membership dues were $25, which was a week's salary for many of the members.

Two years later, the club was incorporated in the state of New York with the stated purpose

...to inculcate a spirit of mutual aid in the newspaper profession, to provide club facilities for its members, to exert proper influences, and to foster and advance the best ideals and standards in the profession of journalism.

— articles of incorporation filed April 18, 1924

== Scholarships ==
The club established a scholarship fund for female students at the Columbia University Graduate School of Journalism in 1945. It awarded the first $200 scholarship to Laura Hoyle Davis at its annual town hall meeting in 1946. $200 scholarships were awarded in subsequent years until 1954, when no scholarship was awarded.

In 1954, the club created the Anne O'Hare McCormick Journalism Scholarship in honor of the late foreign correspondent and editorial board member of The New York Times who served as a vice president of the club for nine years. The New York Times provided $10,000 of the $15,000 needed to establish the annual scholarship. The first $500 scholarship was awarded to Mary Kay Johnson of Wakefield, Rhode Island in 1955 at the club's annual Front Page dinner and dance.

The Mary E. Watts Award was named in honor of the club member and former women's editor of The Sun. The initial $100 scholarship was given in 1962 to Jeanne Heffernan of Troy, New York.

The Eleanor Roosevelt Newspaper Women's Memorial Fund was established in 1964 in honor of the club member and former first lady. The fund provided a fellowship exchange program for two newspaperwomen, one from the United States and the other from Latin America, covering three months of travel, work, and study in the exchange country, including round-trip transportation and a $500 tuition allowance. The club provided the $10,000 seed money for the fund. The first fellowships were awarded in 1965 to Jennie Graciela Vasquez-Solis of La Prensa(es) in Lima, Peru, and Elvira J. Valenzuela of The Wichita Eagle and The Wichita Beacon in Kansas.

The Joan O'Sullivan Scholarship was created in 2008 in honor of the columnist and editor for King Features Syndicate who was also a former president of both the club and the Anne O’Hare McCormick Memorial Fund. Former club president Roslind Massow provided the seed money to establish the scholarship.

== Notable people ==
- Lucile Saunders McDonald (1898-1992), journalist, historian, and author
