= Rollo Ogden =

United States journalist

Rollo Ogden (January 19, 1856 – February 22, 1937) was an American journalist.

== Biography ==
Ogden was born in Sand Lake, New York, educated at Williams College and Union Theological Seminary and in 1881 was ordained a Presbyterian minister. For two years he was a missionary in Mexico City, then became pastor of the Case Avenue Church of Cleveland, Ohio.

In 1887 he began his journalistic work in New York City, becoming editor of the New York Evening Post in 1903. In 1920 he left the Post to assume the associate editorship of the New York Times. He became editor in 1922.

He and Susan M. Mitchell were married in 1881.
