= Reeder (surname) =

Reeder is an English and German surname. Notable people with the surname include the following:

- Andrew Horatio Reeder (1807–1864), first governor of the Territory of Kansas
- Annika Reeder (born 1979), British artistic gymnast
- Bertha S. Reeder (1892–1982), American Mormon missionary
- Carolyn Reeder (1937–2012), American author
- Conrad Reeder (born 1954), Recording artist, singer songwriter and playwright
- Dan Reeder (born 1961), American former footballer
- David Reeder (1931–2005), English historian
- Eggert Reeder (1894–1959), German civil servant and Nazi administrator
- Francis Reeder (1850–1908), English-born New Zealand cricketer
- Icicle Reeder (1858–1913), American Major League baseball player
- J. G. Reeder, fictional character in stories by Edgar Wallace
- Jim Reeder (1925–1972), American baseball player
- Joe R. Reeder (born 1947), American lawyer
- John R. Reeder (1914–2009), American botanist
- Kat Reeder, Peruvian-American artist
- Levi Branson Reeder (1865–1930), U.S. attorney and Republican politician
- Mark Reeder (born 1958), British musician and record producer
- Nick Reeder (1867–1894), American baseball player
- Pierre De Reeder (born 1973), American musician
- Russell Reeder (1902–1998), U.S. Army officer and author
- Scott Reeder (bassist) (born 1965), American bass player
- Scott Reeder (drummer), American drummer
- Scott Reeder (artist) (born 1970), American artist and filmmaker
- Troy Reeder (born 1994), American football player
- William A. Reeder (1849–1929), American Representative from Kansas

== See also ==
- Rehder
- Reder
- Reader (surname)
