= Emma Bugbee =

American suffragist and journalist (1888–1981)

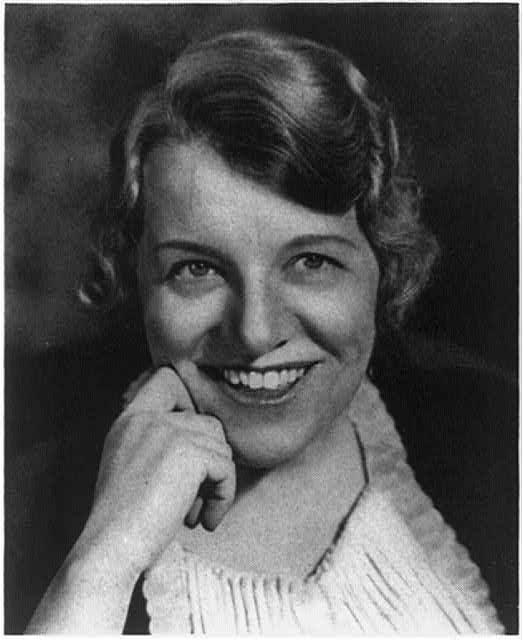
- Born: May 19, 1888; Shippensburg, Pennsylvania
- Died: October 6, 1981 (aged 93); Warwick, Rhode Island
- Education: Barnard College
- Occupation: Journalist

Emma Bugbee (May 19, 1888 – October 6, 1981) was an American suffragist and journalist. She participated in and reported on the 1912 Suffrage Hike from New York City to Albany, New York and reported on Eleanor Roosevelt for 34 years. She was one of the founders of the New York Newspaper Woman's Club, now called the Newswomen’s Club of New York.

== Biography ==
She was born in Shippensburg, Pennsylvania. She later moved to New York. She graduated from Barnard College in 1909, where she was the student correspondent for the New York Tribune, later the New York Herald Tribune, and taught Greek courses at a high school in Methuen, Massachusetts. She became a reporter for the New York Tribune in 1910 She was the first woman reporter to be hired for the Herald's city room.

In 1976, Bugbee moved to Warwick, Rhode Island. She died on October 6, 1981, in Warwick, Rhode Island.

== Career ==
=== Expanding the role of women in journalism ===
In 1914, she covered the Suffrage hike from Manhattan to Albany, New York. From 1924 to 1952, she covered national political conventions from women's points of view, and was known for trying to find the women's angle to any story she was assigned. She was present for the first convention in which women were voting delegates in 1924. Bugbee was first credited with a byline after four years of writing. It was not until 1915 in which she was granted a desk in the newsroom alongside the male reporters. Her fictional 'Peggy' series based on her experiences as a reporter inspired many women to become journalists.

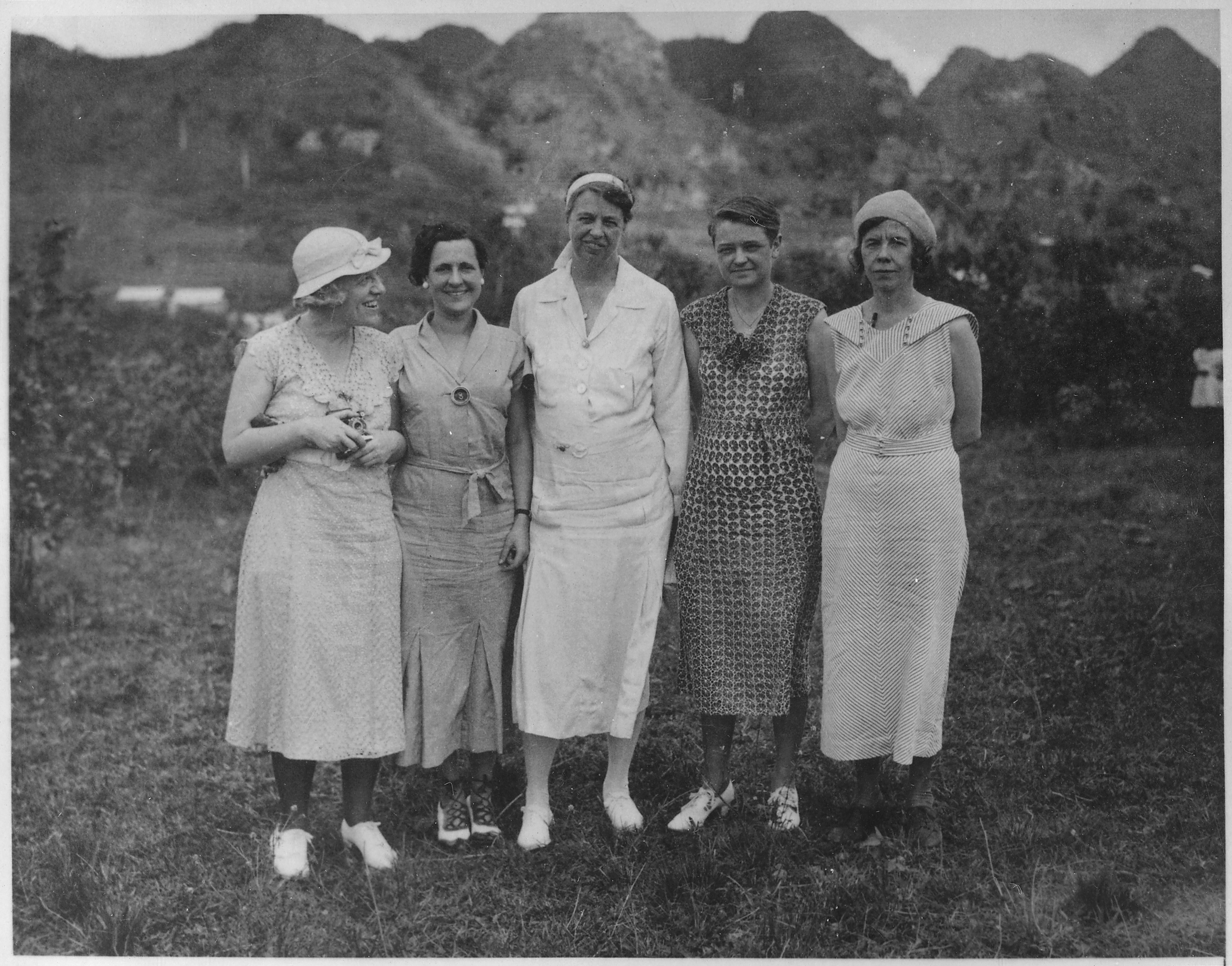
Bugbee [far left] with Eleanor Roosevelt [centre] and the other journalists in her press corps.

=== Work with Eleanor Roosevelt ===
Bugbee reported on Eleanor Roosevelt from 1928 until Mrs. Roosevelt's death in 1962. Bugbee was a part of Roosevelt's inner circle of journalists in her press corps. Her writings on Mrs. Roosevelt contributed largely to the positive image of the Roosevelt administration. Bugbee's tribute to Mrs. Roosevelt after her death in the New York Herald Tribune, "Mrs. Roosevelt: Portrait of a Beloved Woman," won the Newspaper Reporters Association's feature award in 1963.

== Newswomen's Club of New York ==
The Newswomen's Club of New York is a professional organization for women journalists in New York. It was founded in 1922 in order to support women in journalism, work towards equality in the newsroom, and build a network through which women in the industry could help one another. The club became known for its high journalistic standards, as well as its welfare committee and relief fund. Bugbee was amongst the founders of club, also serving as president for three terms.

== Publications ==
=== Children's Literature ===
- Peggy Covers the News. New York: Dodd, Mead & Co., 1936.
- Peggy Covers Washington. New York: Dodd, Mead & Co., 1937.
- Peggy Covers London. New York: Dodd, Mead & Co., 1939.
- Peggy Covers the Clipper. New York: Dodd, Mead & Co., 1941.
- Peggy Goes Overseas. New York: Dodd, 1945.

=== Articles ===
- New York Herald Tribune. "Hopeful Scenes in the Women's Court Under Improved Conditions," 1919.
- New York Herald Tribune. "Hellen Keller Honoured at Dinner Here," 1955.
- New York Herald Tribune. "Mrs. Roosevelt: Portrait of a Beloved Woman," 1962.

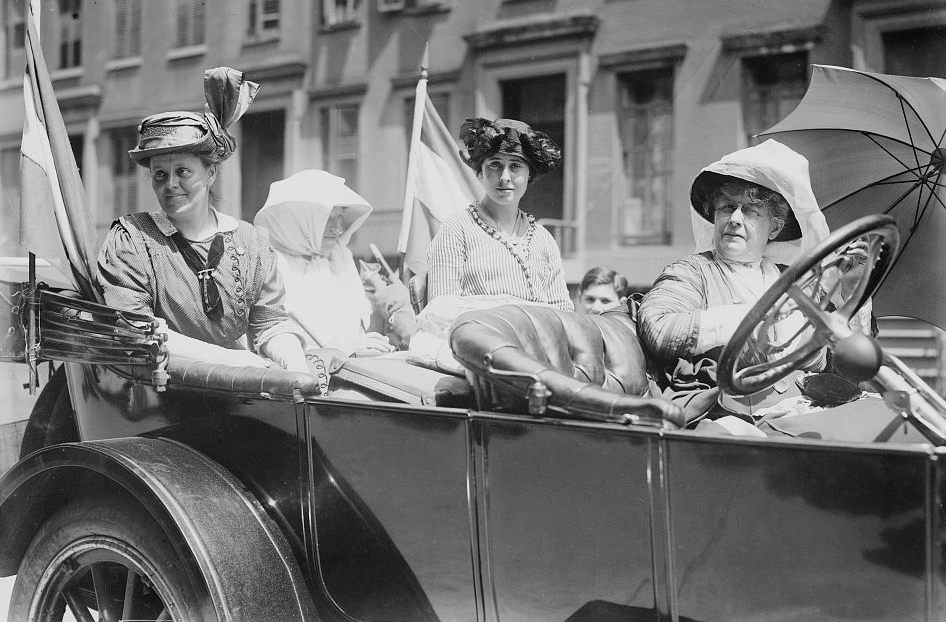
Susan Walker Fitzgerald, Harriot Eaton Stanton Blatch, Maggie Murphy, and Emma Bugbee c. 1910

== See also ==
- List of suffragists and suffragettes
- List of women's rights activists
- Timeline of women's suffrage
- Timeline of women's rights (other than voting)
