= The Reader (magazine) =

British literary magazine

The Reader was a Liverpool-based literary magazine published quarterly by The Reader Organisation. The magazine was founded in 1997 by Sarah Coley, Jane Davis, and Angela Macmillan with a grant from the University of Liverpool's School of English. It operated as part of the University of Liverpool until 2008 when the parent organisation became an independent charitable body. The Reader magazine was edited by Philip Davis, author, biographer, and Professor of English at the University of Liverpool. The Deputy Editor was Sarah Coley. The magazine was stopped in February 2023.

The magazine features original poetry and short fiction, essays, interviews and recommendations with an emphasis on the enjoyment of reading good quality writing. Issues are based loosely around a given theme, with letters, a crossword and the famously tricky "Buck's Quiz" making up the last section. Since taking over the editorship from his wife in 2007 Philip Davis has overseen a successful redesign and relaunch and the magazine now includes a small amount of photography. The magazine has managed to attract many high-profile contributors over the years, including A. S. Byatt, Howard Jacobson, Seamus Heaney, Will Self, Graham Swift, John Kinsella, Les Murray, John Carey, Bel Mooney and Jonathan Bate.

As well as the magazine, The Reader Organisation promotes live literature and outreach events and educational community-based projects such as Get Into Reading, promoting and researching the therapeutic value of reading ("bibliotherapy"). In this context The Reader supports and works with other U.K. arts in health charities such as Poems in the Waiting Room. In 2008, it spun off from the University of Liverpool as an independent charitable organisation with Blake Morrison as its Chair and Jane Davis as director.

== See also ==
- List of literary magazines
