= Carr Van Anda =

American journalist

Carr V. Van Anda
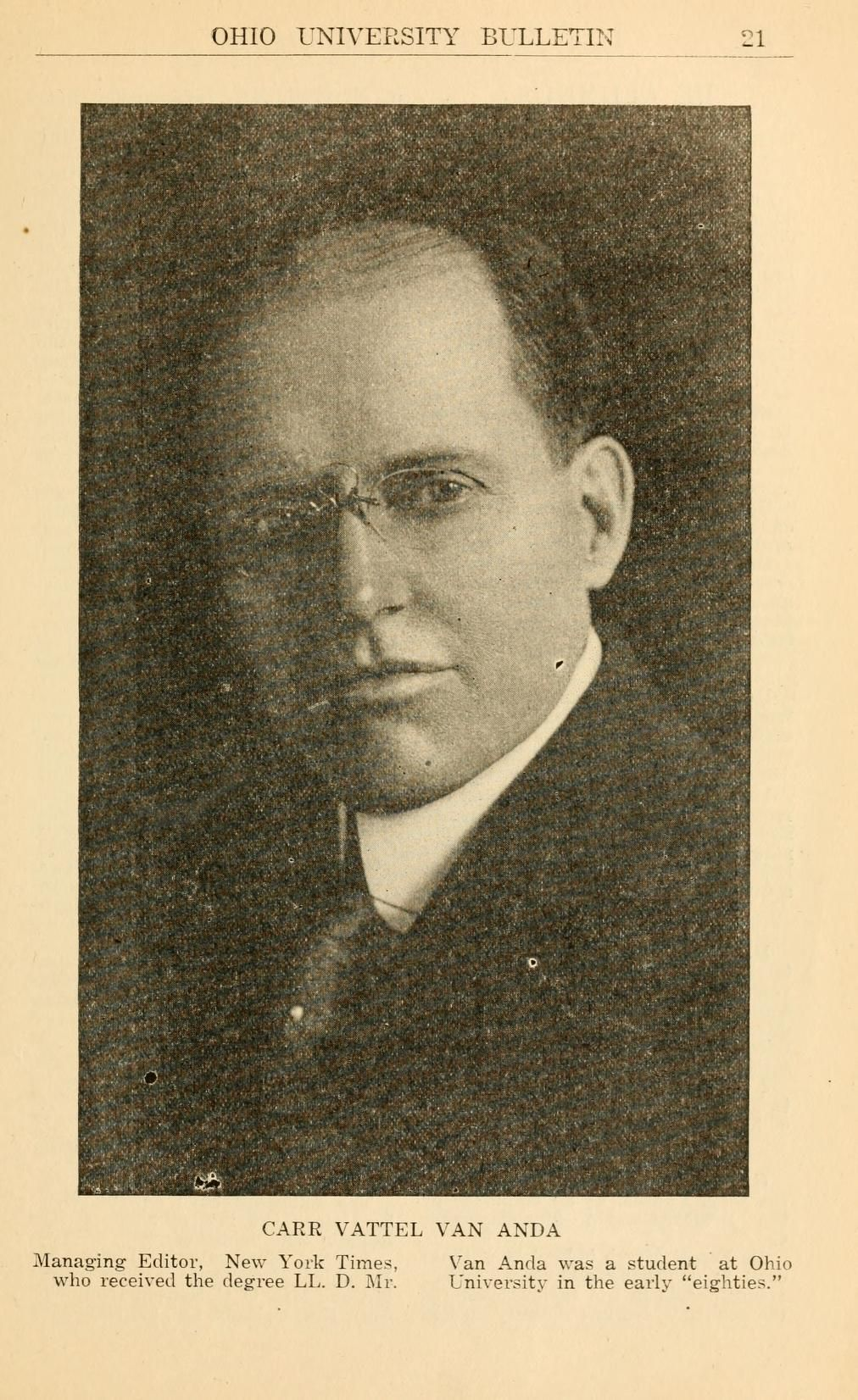
- Van Anda in 1920
- Born: December 2, 1863; Georgetown, Ohio
- Died: January 28, 1945 (aged 81); Manhattan, New York
- Education: Ohio University
- Occupation: Journalist
- Notable credit: The New York Times
- Spouse: Louise Shipman Drane

Carr Vattal Van Anda (December 2, 1864 – January 29, 1945) was the managing editor of The New York Times under Adolph Ochs, from 1904 to 1932.

== Biography ==
Van Anda was born in Georgetown, Ohio to Frederick Van Anda and Mariah Davis. He moved to New York in order to become a journalist and editor. Beginning at the New York Sun he moved to The New York Times in 1904. Van Anda was an academic, studying astronomy and physics at Ohio University, and started in journalism at The Cleveland Herald and Gazette and later The Baltimore Sun before being picked up by Adolph Simon Ochs, who valued intelligent and accurate news reporting.

Van Anda gave political and scientific news coverage the same zeal normally reserved for sports and celebrities. Fluent in hieroglyphics, he secured near-exclusive coverage of the opening of Tutankhamun's tomb by Howard Carter in 1923. He famously corrected a mathematical error in a speech given by Albert Einstein that was to be printed in the Times.

He was instrumental in getting a scoop for The Times on the story of the sinking of the RMS Titanic in 1912. While other newspapers were printing the White Star Line's ambiguous story about the Titanic having trouble after hitting an iceberg, Van Anda (who had received a bulletin reporting a CQD (now SOS) call from the Titanic,) figured that a lack of communication from the ship meant that the worst had happened and printed a headline stating that the Titanic had sunk. Another notable story was the 1911 New York State Capitol fire in Albany, New York, which he covered with a phone call and some journalistic invention. As his career progressed, it was said of him that "he is the most illustrious unknown man in America." According to a New Yorker profile piece, V.A. (as he was called) practiced "a fierce anonymity while bestowing fleeting fame on some and withholding it from others."

On April 11, 1898, Van Anda married Louise Shipman Drane, who was born in Frankfort, Kentucky, on November 26, 1873, to George Canning Drane and Mary Shipman. They had a son, Paul Drane Van Anda (born March 30, 1899). Van Anda died of a heart attack in 1945 immediately upon learning of his daughter's death.

The E.W. Scripps School of Journalism at Ohio University gave the "Carr Van Anda Award" to recognize outstanding work by journalists during their careers.

He is referenced by Richard Gere's character in episode 7 of the BBC Drama MotherFatherSon.

== Sources ==
- NPR story
- "News Judge". Time. 1945-02-05. Archived from the original on 2016-03-10.
- Carr Van Anda Biography at E.W. Scripps School of Journalism, Ohio University.
- David W. Dunlap, "1925: In One Day, The Times Lost a World of Knowledge", The New York Times, Dec. 16, 2014.
