= The Reader Magazine =

- Cover page, winter 2015
- Editor: Christopher Theodore
- Categories: local news, global news
- Frequency: quarterly
- Total circulation: 390,000 (2017)
- Founder: Christopher Theodore
- Founded: November 2000
- First issue: January 2001
- Company: Noble Media, Inc.
- Country: United States
- Based in: Redlands, California
- Language: English
- Website: www.reader.us

The Reader Magazine is a free, printed, quarterly magazine based in Redlands, California, containing public interest journalism. It has a circulation of 390,000 by mail.

== History ==
The Reader Magazine was founded by Christopher Theodore in November 2000 and was originally called The Redlands Community Coupon Book. The first issue appeared in January 2001. The first issue was a twelve-page coupon magazine with four-pages of community news mailed to 30,000 households. From 2002 to 2004, the publication was called The Redlands Reader during which time The Yucaipa Reader was launched, which increased the circulation to 60,000 households.

In 2005, the name of the publication was changed to The Reader Magazine and circulation doubled to 120,000 households by including the cities of: Banning, Beaumont, Colton, Grand Terrace, Loma Linda, Highland, and San Bernardino. As of 2015, the largest Reader Magazine of the four regional publications is 40-pages, half news content and half local advertising. The four Reader Magazines are mailed to a total of 390,000 persons in San Bernardino and Riverside counties.

In March 2018, Noble Media, which owns Reader, raised $200,000 in capital from the Valley Economic Development Center (VEDC), a non-profit community funder.

== Controversy ==
In 2011, The Reader Magazine was described in the Columbia Journalism Review as employing a business model based on plagiarism, when they identified a number of cases of suspected plagiarism in the publication. These accusations were denied by The Reader. The Reader undertook legal action against the Columbia Journalism Review and the article's author. The Columbia Journalism Review subsequently reported that The Reader appeared to have reformed.
