= Meyer Berger =

American journalist (1898–1959)

- Born: September 1, 1898; New York City, U.S.
- Died: February 8, 1959 (aged 60)
- Occupation: Journalist
- Writing career
- Period: 1928–1959
- Notable awards: Pulitzer Prize for Local Reporting (1950)

Meyer "Mike" Berger (September 1, 1898 – February 8, 1959) was an American journalist, considered one of the finest newspaper reporters. He was also known for "About New York", a long-running column in The New York Times, and for his centennial history of that paper. Since the year after his death, Columbia School of Journalism annually gives the Berger Award to a reporter for outstanding local reporting.

== Early life ==
Meyer Berger was born in New York City on September 1, 1898, the son of a Czech (that is, from Austria-Hungary) immigrant father and a storekeeper mother. Sometime after his birth, the family moved from the Lower East Side of New York City to the Williamsburg section of Brooklyn. Berger dropped out of school for financial reasons and became a messenger for a newspaper, the New York World. During World War I, Berger was a member of the 106th Infantry, 26th U.S. Division and was awarded a Purple Heart and the Silver Star. In 1928, Berger joined the staff of The Times, where, except for a short stint at The New Yorker, he worked until his death in 1959.

== Career ==
Berger soon became the top color writer at The Times (whose 1959 obituary labeled him "master of human-interest story") writing mostly on local matters including murders, the mob, and the 1939 New York World's Fair. Known for his use of detail and color, Berger's pieces were often used in other media. His report on the first wounded soldiers returning from Europe during World War II became a radio script while another became a documentary. In 1939, he began the column "About New York". His book about New York, The Eight Million: a journal of a New York correspondent, was published by Simon & Schuster in 1942, as was The Story of the New York Times 1851–1951 in 1951. (Times publisher Arthur Hays Sulzberger cut several passages about his leadership from the book, which left Berger "ashamed" of the final product.) A collection of "About New York" columns was published posthumously as Meyer Berger's New York (Random House, 1960). The first edition was introduced by Brooks Atkinson; a later edition by Pete Hamill.

=== Pulitzer Prize ===
Berger won the annual Pulitzer Prize for Local Reporting in 1950. At that time there were International, National, and Local prizes for reporting. The number of subdivisions has increased, sometimes including one specifically for local reports "prepared under the pressure of edition time", such as Berger's account of the rampage by mass murderer Howard Unruh in Camden, New Jersey on September 6, 1949. A 28-year-old World War II veteran, Unruh killed 13 people, wounded several others and was arrested after a police standoff at his apartment in Camden. For the report, Berger retraced Unruh's steps and interviewed 50 witnesses. He prepared and typed the 4,000-word article in two-and-a-half hours and it was published unedited in the newspaper the next morning. Berger donated the $1,000 Pulitzer Prize money to Unruh's mother.

== Legacy ==
Berger is often called one of the best American journalists and some of his articles are considered to be the best examples of color reporting: such as his Pulitzer winner, his report on the arrival of the first set of coffins from Europe after the war, and the baseball poetry he wrote about the error that cost the Brooklyn Dodgers the fourth game of the 1941 World Series. The Meyer Berger Award for outstanding human-interest journalism is named after him. Newsday reporter Murray Kempton is said to have expressed disappointment that he had never won "the Berger", at the Berger luncheon after winning the Pulitzer: "The Pulitzer is named for a publisher. The Meyer Berger is named for a reporter."

== Bibliography ==
=== Books ===
- Berger, Meyer (1942). The eight million : journal of a New York correspondent. Illustrated by Henry Berger. New York: Simon and Schuster.
- Keller, James & Meyer Berger (1943). Men of Maryknoll. New York: Scribner's.
- Berger, Meyer (1950). Growth of an ideal, 1850-1950 : the story of the Manhattan Savings Bank.
- — (1951). The story of the New York Times, 1851-1951. New York: Simon and Schuster.
- — (1960). Meyer Berger's New York. New York: Random House.

=== Essays and reporting ===
- Berger, Meyer (January 1, 1938). "'Aïda' through the looking glass". A Reporter at Large. The New Yorker. 13 (46): 32–36.
