= Ishbel Ross =

American novelist

- Born: December 15, 1895; Bonar Bridge, Scotland
- Died: September 21, 1975 (aged 79); New York City, New York, U.S.
- Occupation: Author

Ishbel Ross (December 15, 1895 – September 21, 1975) was an American newspaper reporter, novelist, and nonfiction writer. In a writing career spanning six decades, Ross wrote numerous biographies of prominent women, with her best-known work being the first substantial history of women journalists.

== Biography ==
Ishbel Ross was born on December 15, 1895, in Bonar Bridge, Scotland, one of six children of David Ross and Grace (McCrone) Ross. She graduated from the Tain Royal Academy in 1916 and then emigrated to Canada, where she took a job as a publicist for the Canadian Food Board. She started out as a clerk on the Toronto Daily News and rose quickly to become a bylined reporter. A factor in her early success was an exclusive interview she obtained with the suffragist Emmeline Pankhurst in 1917 when Pankhurst was en route to Toronto.

Ross left the Toronto Daily News in 1919 for a job as a general assignment reporter at the New-York Tribune, becoming the second woman reporter (after Emma Bugbee) to be hired for this paper's city room. Among the stories she covered for the paper were the high-profile Hall–Mills murder case and Lindbergh baby kidnapping.

In 1922, she married New York Times reporter Bruce Rae, with whom she had a daughter.

In the 1930s, Ross turned to writing novels. Her first, Promenade Deck, was published in 1932. She left the paper the following year to concentrate on novel writing, publishing four more during her lifetime.

At the instigation of the New-York Tribune's city editor, Stanley Walker, she also began writing nonfiction. Her first book, Ladies of the Press (1936), was the first formal history of women in journalism, examining the various roles women have played in print journalism, with a focus on notable journalists like Marguerite Martyn, Margaret Fuller, Nellie Bly, and Dorothy Dix. Although limited to white women, it looked at those working in both urban and rural settings. Ross identified more than 300 women editors and publishers working at papers throughout the United States. It is still considered "the classic work among the general histories" of the subject.

Ross wrote some twenty nonfiction books, many of which were lives of famous women, ranging from the wives of American presidents to physician Elizabeth Blackwell, American Red Cross founder Clara Barton, and Confederate spy Rose O'Neal Greenhow. Her other books addressed more general topics such as education for the blind (Journey into the Light, 1951) and American taste (Taste in America, 1967). Her books were considered well-researched though written in a journalistic rather than academic style.

Ross died in New York City on September 21, 1975, of unknown causes, surviving her husband by 12 years. Some of her papers are in the Schlesinger Library in Cambridge, Massachusetts.

== Books ==
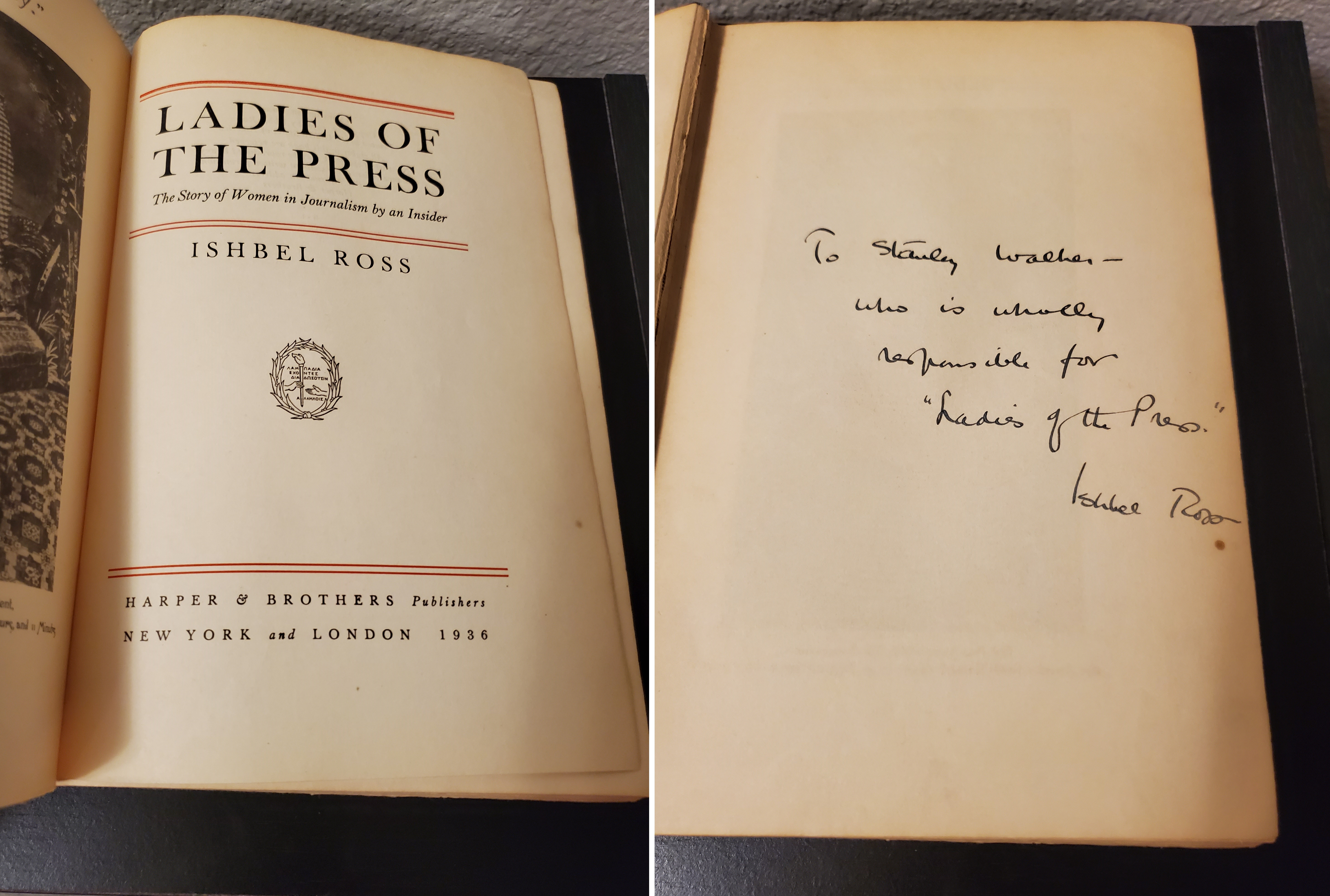
Inscribed copy of Ladies of The Press, presented to Stanley Walker. From the collection of Jane Walker Williamson, Stanley Walker's niece.

- Through The Lich-gate (1931)
- Promenade Deck (1932)
- Marriage in Gotham (1933)
- Highland Twilight (1934)
- Ladies of the Press (1936)
- Fifty Years a Woman (1938)
- Isle of Escape (1942)
- Child of Destiny: The Life Story of the First Woman Doctor (1944; biography of Elizabeth Blackwell)
- Charmers and Cranks: Twelve Famous American Women Who Defied Convention (1965)
- Journey into the Light (1951)
- Proud Kate Portrait Of An Ambitious Woman (1953; biography of Kate Chase)
- Rebel Rose: Life of Rose O'Neal Greenhow (1954; biography of Rose O'Neal Greenhow)
- The Print Shop of the Blind (1957)
- First Lady of the South: The Life of Mrs. Jefferson Davis (1958; biography of Varina Davis)
- The General's Wife: The Life of Mrs. Ulysses S. Grant (1959; biography of Julia Grant)
- Grace Coolidge and Her Era (1962; biography of Grace Coolidge)
- Crusades & Crinoline's (1963)
- An American Family: The Tafts, 1678 to 1964 (1964; biography of the Taft family)
- Taste in America: An Illustrated History (1967)
- Sons of Adam, daughters of Eve (1969)
- The Expatriates (1970)
- The uncrowned queen; life of Lola Montez (1972; biography of Lola Montez)
- The President's Wife: Mary Todd Lincoln (1973; biography of Mary Todd Lincoln)
- Power with Grace: The Life Story of Mrs. Woodrow Wilson (1975; biography of Edith Wilson)
- Silhouette in Diamonds: The Life of Mrs. Potter Palmer (1975; biography of Bertha Palmer)
