= The Reader (newspaper) =

Former alternative newspaper in Nebraska

- Type: Alternative newspaper
- Owner: Pioneer Publishing
- Publisher: John Heaston
- News editor: Chris Bowling
- Founded: 1994
- Ceased publication: 2023
- Headquarters: 4734 S 27 St Suite 1A Omaha, NE 68107
- Website: thereader.com

The Reader was an alternative newspaper in Omaha, Nebraska from 1994 to 2023. The newspaper was owned by Pioneer Publishing, which also published several other papers and websites, including the Spanish language El Perico.

== History ==
The Reader was established in 1994 by a group that included John Heaston and Dan Beckmann. Beckmann bought out Heaston in 1999, then sold nearly all of his ownership interest in February 2000 to 77-year-old Alan Baer, a member of the family that had founded the J. L. Brandeis and Sons department store chain. Baer replaced Beckmann as publisher a few months later.

Meanwhile, Heaston established another paper, the Omaha Weekly, in March 2000. After Baer died in November 2002, Heaston bought the Reader and merged it with the Weekly. Heaston was interviewed in 2021 about the Reader's history as part of the paper's recent membership drive on a biweekly podcast "Reader Radio."

In January 2015, The Reader changed its publication frequency from weekly to monthly and increased daily content on The Reader's website.

In 2022, The Reader was named as one of "10 news publishers who do it right" by Editor & Publisher magazine. The paper published its last issue in September 2023. In May 2024, Heaston gifted the assets of The Reader and El Perico to Nebraska Public Media.
