= Hap (nickname) =

As a nickname, Hap or Haps is commonly short for Henry, Harry, Harold, or Harrison. It may refer to:

== People with the nickname ==
- Henry H. Arnold (1886–1950), American General of the Army and General of the Air Force
- Hap Collard (1898–1968), American Major League Baseball (MLB) pitcher
- Hap Day (1901–1990), Canadian National Hockey League (NHL) Hall of Fame player, coach, and general manager
- Hap Emms (1905–1988), Canadian NHL player, coach, general manager, and team owner
- Hap Farber (born 1948), American National Football League (NFL) player
- Harrison Farber, American professor of medicine and Director of the Pulmonary Hypertension Center at Boston University
- Frank S. Farley (1901–1977), American politician and New Jersey State Senator
- Hobart R. Gay (1894–1983), US Army lieutenant general
- Hap Hadley (1895–1976), American artist specializing in pen and ink representations
- Hap Holmes (1892–1941), Canadian NHL goaltender
- Emil Huhn (1892–1925), American MLB player
- B. Kliban (1935–1990), American cartoonist
- Louis Kuehn (1901–1981), American diver and 1920 Olympic gold medalist
- Harry McSween (born 1945), Professor of Planetary Geoscience and Distinguished Professor of Science at the University of Tennessee at Knoxville
- Hap Marre, American soccer player of the 1910s
- Herb Mitchell (ice hockey) (1895–1969), Canadian NHL player
- Hap Moran (1901–1994), American NFL halfback
- Hap Myers (1887–1967), American MLB player
- Hap Myers (ice hockey) (born 1947), Canadian NHL player
- Harold Ridley (Jesuit) (1939–2005), Roman Catholic priest and President of Loyola College in Maryland
- Hap Sharp (1928–1993), American race car driver
- Hap Spuhler (1918–1982), American college head baseball coach and athletic director
- Hap Ward (1868–1944), American comedian and actor
- Hap Ward (1885–1979), who played one game in the MLB when the Detroit Tigers went on strike

== Fictional characters with the nickname ==
- Hap Eckhart, in Christopher Nolan's 2002 film Insomnia, played by Martin Donovan
- Harry "Hap" Loman, in Arthur Miller's play Death of a Salesman
- Hap, in the 1989 film Always, played by Audrey Hepburn
- Hap Collins, in novels and stories by Joe R. Lansdale – see Hap and Leonard
- Hap Shaughnessy on the Canadian TV comedy series The Red Green Show
- Hap Smith, in the 1952 film Jumping Jacks, played by Jerry Lewis
- Harlan "Hap" Briggs, played by actor Don Johnson on the ABC prime time television drama series Blood & Oil
- Leslie "Hap" Hapablap, an Air Force colonel in The Simpsons, voiced by R. Lee Ermey
- Dr. Hunter "Hap" Aloysius Percy, the antagonist in The OA, played by Jason Isaacs

== See also ==
- Happy (nickname)
- Haps (disambiguation)
- HAP (disambiguation)
