= HAP =

Hap or HAP may refer to:

== Natural sciences ==
- Hap, a cultivar of Karuka
- Haplochromine cichlids
- Hazardous air pollutant
- Hospital-acquired pneumonia
- Hydroxylapatite (HAp), a mineral
- Hypoxia-activated prodrug

== Organizations ==
- Hap inc.
- Health Australia Party, a political party
- Health Alliance Plan, a health insurance agency in Michigan
- Hospital and Healthsystem Association of Pennsylvania
- Housing Authority of Portland
- Humanitarian Accountability Partnership
- Rights and Justice Party (Turkish: Hak ve Adalet Partisi), a Turkish political party

== People ==
- Hap (nickname)
- Helmut Andreas Paul HAP Grieshaber (1909–1981), German artist
- Henry Augustus Pearson Torrey (1837–1902), American professor of philosophy
- Phạm Hạp (died 979), a general of the Đinh dynasty of Vietnam

== Technology ==
- Hap (file format)
- High-altitude platform
- Tiger HAP, a helicopter

== Other uses ==
- "Hap" (poem), in Thomas Hardy's Wessex Poems and Other Verses
- Hap, an archaic word for luck or fortune
- hap, ISO 639-3 code for the Hupla language of the Indonesian New Guinea Highlands

== See also ==
- Haps (disambiguation)
