= Jane Dewey =

American physicist (1900–1976)

Jane Mary Dewey
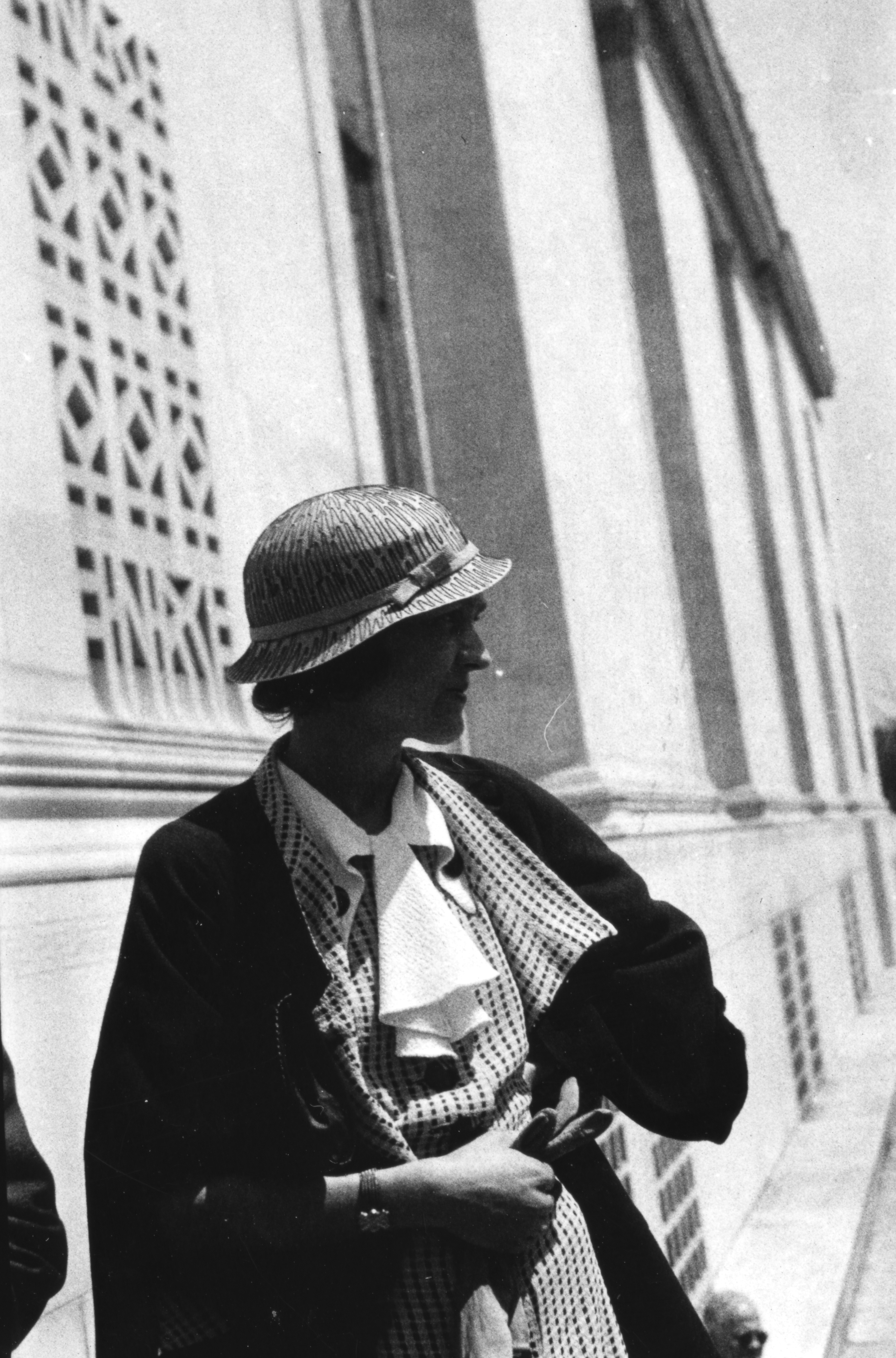
- Jane Dewey, AIP in Washington
- Born: July 11, 1900
- Died: September 19, 1976 (aged 76)
- Education: Barnard College; Massachusetts Institute of Technology
- Scientific career
- Workplaces: University of Rochester; Bryn Mawr College; Hunter College; United States Rubber Company; Ballistic Research Laboratory

Jane Mary Dewey (July 11, 1900 – September 19, 1976) was an American physicist.

== Early life and education ==
Jane Mary Dewey was born in Chicago, the daughter (and sixth child) of philosopher John Dewey and educator Alice Chipman Dewey. Her parents named her in honor of Jane Addams, an activist, sociologist, and reformer; and Mary Rozet Smith, a philanthropist who was Addams's longtime companion.

She was educated at the Ethical Culture School and then the Spence School, after which she attended Barnard College, graduating in 1922. She moved from New York to New England for graduate studies, earning a PhD in physical chemistry from the Massachusetts Institute of Technology in 1925.

== Career ==
After graduating from MIT, Dewey worked for two years researching in the newly emergent field of quantum mechanics with Nobelist Niels Bohr and future-Nobelist Werner Heisenberg as a postdoctoral researcher at the Universitets Institut for Teoretisk Fysik in Copenhagen. During this time, she delivered a series of lectures on wave mechanics to the rest of Bohr's research team. She then moved to Princeton University, where she worked with Karl Taylor Compton with support from a National Research Council fellowship. In 1929, she became a faculty member at the University of Rochester, nominally under the geology department but in fact at the university's Institute of Applied Optics. Between her time at MIT and her time at Rochester, Dewey was a prolific author, publishing 8 articles in major science journals, the first being "Intensities in the Stark Effect of Helium," published in Physical Review in 1926.

In 1931, Dewey left Rochester for Bryn Mawr College, where she became an assistant professor in physics and, later, the chair of the department. That year, she was elected a Fellow of the American Physical Society, and she soon took on the position of department chair. However, her marriage — to fellow physicist J. Alston Clark — broke apart, and her health worsened, forcing her to take medical leave. During her absence, Bryn Mawr replaced her as chair with a male physics professor (Walter C. Michels), and Dewey was unemployed until 1940, when she found a part-time instructor position at Hunter College. Her health suddenly restored, she moved to industry, taking a wartime job at the United States Rubber Company and then, in 1947, a staff position at the Army's Ballistic Research Laboratory (BRL) at Aberdeen Proving Ground, where she headed the Terminal Ballistics Laboratory.

== Legacy ==
=== Dewey-Mackenzie estimate ===
In a landmark paper while at United States Rubber Company, Dewey derived the elastic constants of a solid material filled with non-rigid particles. In 1950, J. K. Mackenzie presented a similar derivation for a solid containing spherical holes. They both made the assumption that the distribution of the inclusions is diffuse enough that neighboring inclusions do not affect one another. This has led to similar derivations using this assumption being called "Dewey-Mackenzie estimates." Mackenzie's solution may be considered a special case of the more general and difficult problem that Dewey set herself and succeeded in solving exactly. As of 2021, her paper has been cited over 130 times in scientific journals. In fact, the approach in her original paper is now so well known that it is often referred to only indirectly, as a "Dewey-Mackenzie estimate," without citation.

=== Slade-Dewey equation ===
While at BRL, one of her contributions to ballistic science has come to be known as the Slade-Dewey equation, which empirically relates the critical impact velocity V_{t} for initiating detonation of a solid secondary explosive or propellant to the diameter d of an impacting projectile, $V_t = A / \sqrt{d} + B$, where A and B are empirical constants that depend on the explosive.

== Selected publications ==
- Dewey, Jane M. (December 1, 1926). "Intensities in the Stark Effect of Helium". Physical Review. 28 (6): 1108–1124. Bibcode:1926PhRv...28.1108D. doi:10.1103/PhysRev.28.1108. ISSN 0031-899X.
- Keyes, Frederick G.; Dewey, Jane (June 1, 1927). "An Experimental Study of the Piston Pressure Gage to Six Hundred Atmospheres". J. Opt. Soc. Am. 14 (6): 491–504. Bibcode:1927JOSA...14..491K. doi:10.1364/JOSA.14.000491.
- Dewey, Jane M. (1939). "Biography of John Dewey". In Schilpp, P. A. (ed.). The Philosophy of John Dewey. Tudor Publishing Co. pp. 3–45.
- Dewey, Jane M. (June 1947). "The Elastic Constants of Materials Loaded with Non-Rigid Fillers". Journal of Applied Physics. 18 (6): 578–581. Bibcode:1947JAP....18..578D. doi:10.1063/1.1697691. ISSN 0021-8979.
