= Kathleen Knight Abowitz =

American philosopher

Kathleen Knight Abowitz is an American philosopher of education who is a professor in the educational leadership department at the Miami University. She is the president-elect of the Philosophy of Education Society.

== Life ==
Knight Abowitz earned a B.A. in business and economics from Randolph–Macon College in 1989. She completed a M.Ed. in higher education and student affairs administration at the University of Vermont in 1989. Knight Abowitz received a Ph.D. in the social foundations of education and the philosophy of education from the University of Virginia in 1996.

Knight Abowitz is a professor in the educational leadership department at the Miami University. She is a past president of the John Dewey Society. From 2020 to 2023, she was an elected member of the Talawanda School Board. In March 2024, she was announced as the president-elect of the Philosophy of Education Society.
