= John Dewey =

American philosopher, psychologist, and activist (1859–1952)

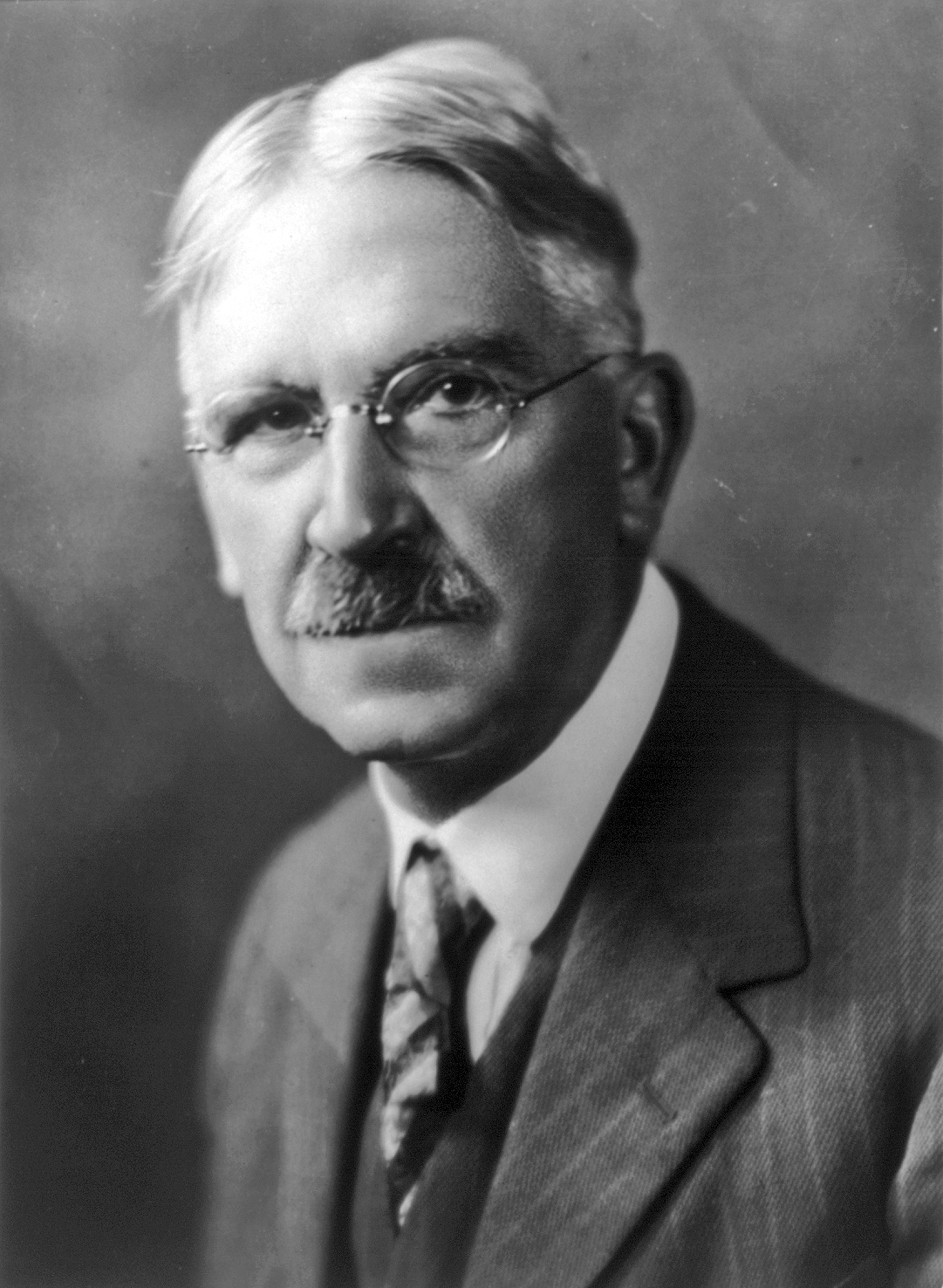
- Portrait by Underwood & Underwood
- Born: October 20, 1859; Burlington, Vermont, U.S.
- Died: June 1, 1952 (aged 92); New York City, U.S.
- Children: 6, including Jane and Evelyn Dewey

Education
- Education: University of Vermont; Johns Hopkins University
- Doctoral advisor: George Sylvester Morris
- Other advisor: C. S. Peirce

Philosophical work
- Era: 20th-century philosophy
- Region: Western philosophy
- School: Pragmatism; Instrumentalism; Functional psychology Process philosophy
- Institutions: University of Michigan; University of Chicago; Laboratory Schools; Teachers College, Columbia University; The New School; American Association of University Professors
- Doctoral students: Feng Youlan, Sidney Hook, Hu Shih, Jiang Menglin, Lin Mosei, Herbert Schneider, Tao Xingzhi
- Notable students: B. R. Ambedkar, Richard McKeon, Ernest Nagel, John Herman Randall Jr.
- Main interests: Philosophy of education, epistemology, journalism, ethics, aesthetics, political philosophy, metaphysics
- Notable ideas: Reflective thinking Functional psychology Immediate empiricism Practical idealism Educational progressivism Occupational psychosis

John Dewey (/ˈduːi/; October 20, 1859 – June 1, 1952) was an American philosopher, psychologist, and educational reformer. He was one of the most prominent American scholars in the first half of the twentieth century.

The overriding theme of Dewey's works was his profound belief in democracy, be it in politics, education, or communication and journalism. As Dewey himself stated in 1888, while still at the University of Michigan, "Democracy and the one, ultimate, ethical ideal of humanity are to my mind synonymous." Dewey considered two fundamental elements—schools and civil society—to be major topics needing attention and reconstruction to encourage experimental intelligence and plurality. He asserted that complete democracy was to be obtained not just by extending voting rights but also by ensuring that there exists a fully formed public opinion, accomplished by communication among citizens, experts, and politicians.

Dewey was one of the primary figures associated with the philosophy of pragmatism and is considered one of the founding thinkers of functional psychology. His paper "The Reflex Arc Concept in Psychology", published in 1896, is regarded as the first major work in the (Chicago) functionalist school of psychology. A Review of General Psychology survey, published in 2002, ranked Dewey as the 93rd-most-cited psychologist of the 20th century.

Dewey was also a major educational reformer for the 20th century. A well-known public intellectual, he was a major voice of progressive education and liberalism. While a professor at the University of Chicago, he founded the University of Chicago Laboratory Schools, where he was able to apply and test his progressive ideas on pedagogical method. From 1904 until his retirement in 1930 he was professor of philosophy at Teachers College, Columbia University.

Although Dewey is known best for his publications about education, he also wrote about many other topics, including epistemology, metaphysics, aesthetics, art, logic, social theory, and ethics.

== Biography ==
=== Early life and education ===
John Dewey was born in Burlington, Vermont, to a family of modest means. He was one of four boys born to Archibald Sprague Dewey and Lucina Artemisia Rich Dewey. Their first son was also named John, but he died in an accident on January 17, 1859. The second John Dewey was born October 20, 1859, forty weeks after the death of his older brother. Like his older, surviving brother, Davis Rich Dewey, he attended the University of Vermont, where he was initiated into Delta Psi, and graduated Phi Beta Kappa in 1879.

A significant professor of Dewey's at the University of Vermont was Henry Augustus Pearson Torrey, the son-in-law and nephew of former University of Vermont president Joseph Torrey. Dewey studied privately with Torrey between his graduation from Vermont and his enrollment at Johns Hopkins University.

=== Career ===
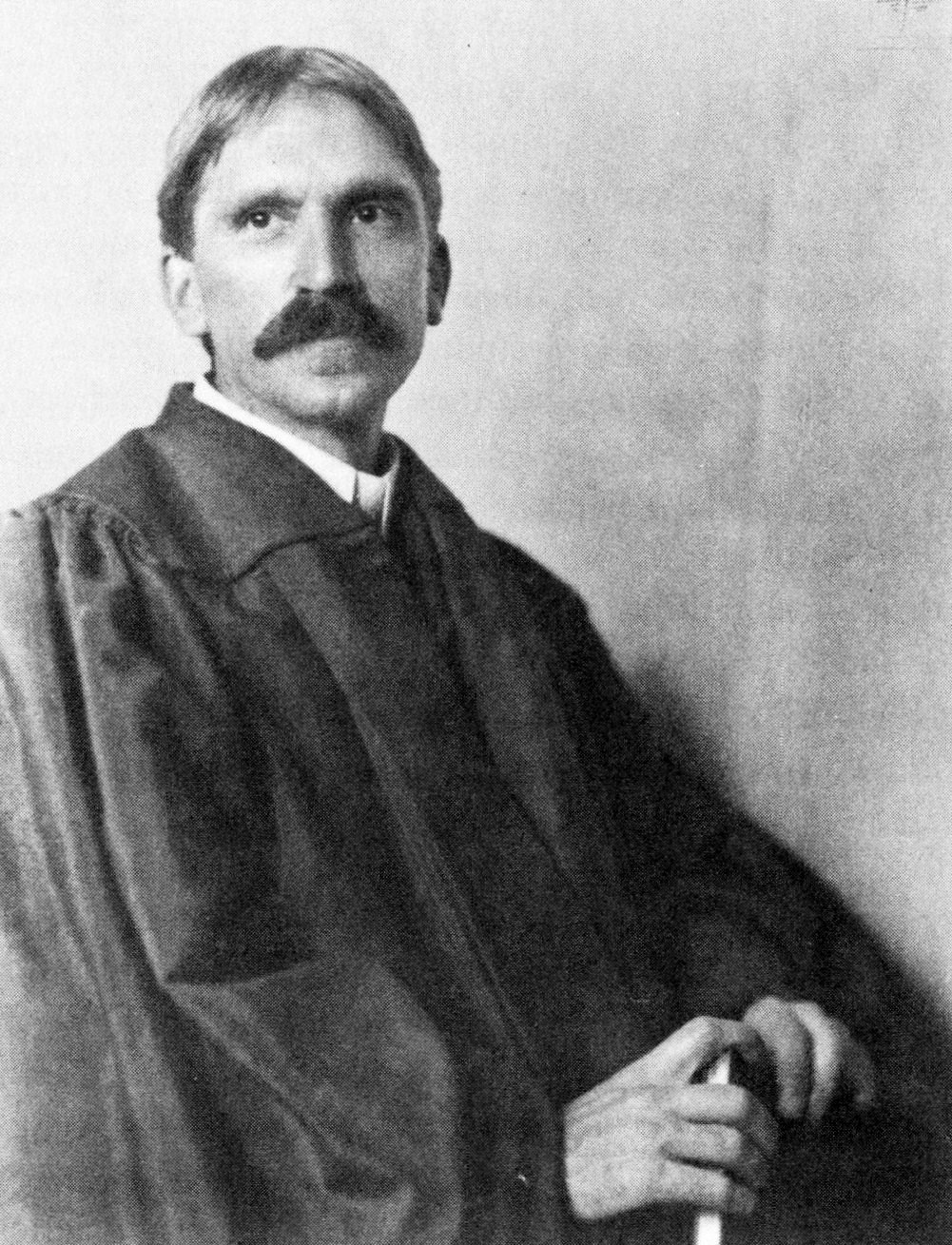
Dewey at the University of Chicago in 1902

After two years as a high-school teacher in Oil City, Pennsylvania, and one year as an elementary school teacher in the small town of Charlotte, Vermont, Dewey decided that he was unsuited for teaching primary or secondary school. After studying with George Sylvester Morris, Charles Sanders Peirce, Herbert Baxter Adams, and G. Stanley Hall, Dewey received his Ph.D. from the School of Arts & Sciences at Johns Hopkins University in 1884. His unpublished and now lost dissertation (criticizing Immanuel Kant from an idealist position) was titled "The Psychology of Kant". In the same year, he accepted a faculty position at the University of Michigan (1884–88 and 1889–94) with the help of George Sylvester Morris.

In 1894, Dewey joined the newly founded University of Chicago (1894–1904) where he developed his belief in Rational Empiricism, becoming associated with the newly emerging Pragmatic philosophy. His time at the University of Chicago resulted in four essays collectively entitled Thought and its Subject-Matter, which was published with collected works from his colleagues at Chicago under the collective title Studies in Logical Theory (1904).

During that time, Dewey also initiated the University of Chicago Laboratory Schools, where he was able to actualize the pedagogical beliefs that provided material for his first major work on education, The School and Society (1899). Disagreements with the administration ultimately caused his resignation from the university, and soon thereafter he relocated near the East Coast. In 1899, Dewey was elected president of the American Psychological Association (A.P.A.). From 1904 until his retirement in 1930 he was professor of philosophy at Teachers College at Columbia University and influenced Carl Rogers.

In 1905, he became president of the American Philosophical Association. He was a longtime member of the American Federation of Teachers. Along with the historians Charles A. Beard and James Harvey Robinson, and the economist Thorstein Veblen, Dewey is one of the founders of The New School.

Dewey published more than 700 articles in 140 journals and approximately 40 books. His most significant writings were "The Reflex Arc Concept in Psychology" (1896), a critique of a standard psychological concept and the basis of all his further work; Democracy and Education (1916), his celebrated work on progressive education; Human Nature and Conduct (1922), a study of the function of habit in human behavior; The Public and its Problems (1927), a defense of democracy written in response to Walter Lippmann's The Phantom Public (1925); Experience and Nature (1925), Dewey's most "metaphysical" statement; Impressions of Soviet Russia and the Revolutionary World (1929), a glowing travelogue from the nascent USSR; Art as Experience (1934), Dewey's major work on aesthetics; A Common Faith (1934), a humanistic study of religion originally delivered as the Dwight H. Terry Lectureship at Yale; Logic: The Theory of Inquiry (1938), a statement of Dewey's unusual conception of logic; Freedom and Culture (1939), a political work examining the roots of fascism; and Knowing and the Known (1949), a book written in conjunction with Arthur F. Bentley that systematically outlines the concept of trans-action, which is central to his other works (see Transactionalism).

While each of these works focuses on one particular philosophical theme, Dewey included his major themes in Experience and Nature. However, dissatisfied with the response to the first (1925) edition, for the second (1929) edition he rewrote the first chapter and added a Preface in which he stated that the book presented what was later called a new (Kuhnian) paradigm: 'I have not striven in this volume for a reconciliation between the new and the old' [E&N:4]. He asserts Kuhnian incommensurability:

'To many the associating of the two words ['experience' and 'nature'] will seem like talking of a round square' but 'I know of no route by which dialectical argument can answer such objections. They arise from association with words and cannot be dealt with argumentatively'. The following can be interpreted now as describing a Kuhnian conversion process: 'One can only hope in the course of the whole discussion to disclose the [new] meanings which are attached to "experience" and "nature," and thus insensibly produce, if one is fortunate, a change in the significations previously attached to them' [all E&N:10].

Reflecting his immense influence on 20th-century thought, Hilda Neatby wrote "Dewey has been to our age what Aristotle was to the later Middle Ages, not a philosopher, but the philosopher."

=== Visits to China and Japan ===
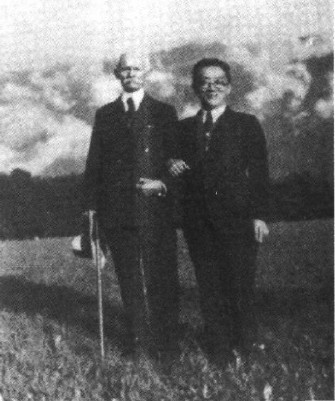
Dewey and Hu Shih, c. 1938–1942

In 1919, Dewey and his wife traveled to Japan on sabbatical leave. Though Dewey and his wife were well received by the people of Japan during this trip, Dewey was also critical of the nation's governing system and claimed that the nation's path towards democracy was "ambitious but weak in many respects in which her competitors are strong". He also warned that "the real test has not yet come. But if the nominally democratic world should go back on the professions so profusely uttered during war days, the shock will be enormous, and bureaucracy and militarism might come back."

During his trip to Japan, Dewey was invited by Peking University to visit China, probably at the behest of his former students, Hu Shih and Chiang Monlin. Dewey and his wife Alice arrived in Shanghai on April 30, 1919, just days before student demonstrators took to the streets of Peking to protest the decision of the Allies in Paris to cede the German-held territories in Shandong province to Japan. Their demonstrations on May Fourth excited and energized Dewey, and he ended up staying in China for two years, leaving in July 1921. He supported the leaders of China's New Education Movement and New Culture Movement.

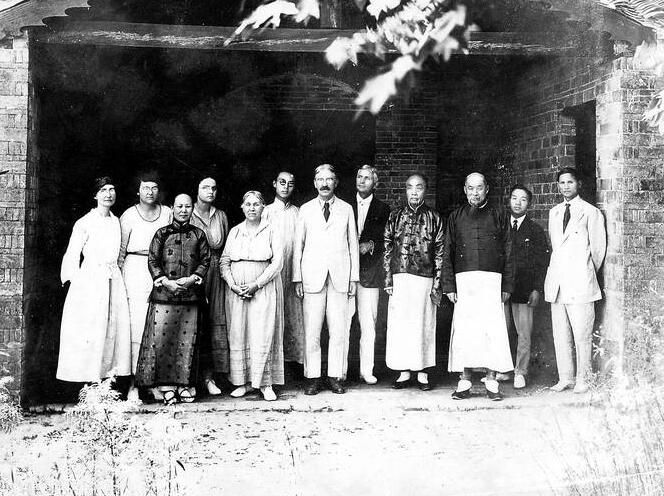
Dewey in China in 1920

In these two years, Dewey visited 11 of China's provinces. He gave nearly 200 lectures to Chinese audiences and wrote nearly monthly articles for Americans in The New Republic and other magazines. Well aware of both Japanese expansionism into China and the attraction of Bolshevism to some Chinese, Dewey advocated that Americans support China's transformation and that Chinese base this transformation in education and social reforms, not revolution. Hundreds and sometimes thousands of people attended the lectures, which were interpreted by Hu Shih. For these audiences, Dewey represented "Mr. Democracy" and "Mr. Science," the two personifications which they thought of representing modern values and hailed him as "the American Confucius". These lectures were widely published in Chinese media and journals, as well as published in book-length collected editions. His lectures were re-published in 2015.

During his time in China, Dewey met with Sun Yat-sen, reform-minded intellectuals, and the warlord Yan Xishan. Dewey's lecture on "Three Contemporary Philosophers: Bertrand Russell, Henri Bergson and William James" at Peking University in 1919 was attended by a young Mao Zedong.

Zhixin Su states:

Dewey was, for those Chinese educators who had studied under him, the great apostle of philosophic liberalism and experimental methodology, the advocate of complete freedom of thought, and the man who, above all other teachers, equated education to the practical problems of civic cooperation and useful living.

Dewey urged the Chinese to not import any Western educational model. He recommended to educators such as Tao Xingzhi, that they use pragmatism to devise their own model school system at the national level. He thought the Western tradition beholden to an assumption that philosophical knowing involves seeking ultimate, true reality above all else. However, the national government was weak, and the provinces largely controlled by warlords, so his suggestions were praised at the national level but not implemented. However, there were a few implementations locally. Dewey's ideas did have influence in Hong Kong, and in Taiwan after the nationalist government fled there. In most of China, Confucian scholars controlled the local educational system before 1949 and they simply ignored Dewey and Western ideas. In Marxist and Maoist China, Dewey's ideas were systematically denounced.

His time in China helped to shape China–United States mutual perceptions.

=== Visit to Southern Africa ===
Dewey and his daughter Jane went to South Africa in July 1934, at the invitation of the World Conference of New Education Fellowship in Cape Town and Johannesburg, where he delivered several talks. The conference was opened by the South African Minister of Education Jan Hofmeyr, and Deputy Prime Minister Jan Smuts. Other speakers at the conference included Max Eiselen and Hendrik Verwoerd, who later became prime minister of the Nationalist government that introduced apartheid.

Dewey's expenses were paid by the Carnegie Foundation. He also traveled to Durban, Pretoria and Victoria Falls in what was then Southern Rhodesia (now Zimbabwe) and looked at schools, talked to pupils, and gave lectures to the administrators and teachers. In August 1934, Dewey accepted an honorary degree from the University of the Witwatersrand. The white-only governments rejected Dewey's ideas as too secular. However black people and their white supporters were more receptive.

=== Personal life ===
Dewey married Alice Chipman in 1886 shortly after Chipman graduated with her Ph.D. from the University of Michigan. The two had six children: Frederick Archibald Dewey, Evelyn Riggs Dewey, Morris (who died young), Gordon Chipman Dewey, Lucy Alice Chipman Dewey, and Jane Mary Dewey. Alice Chipman died in 1927 at the age of 68; weakened by a case of malaria contracted during a trip to Turkey in 1924 and a heart attack during a trip to Mexico City in 1926, she died from cerebral thrombosis on July 13, 1927. Dewey married Estelle Roberta Lowitz Grant, "a longtime friend and companion for several years before their marriage" on December 11, 1946. At Roberta's behest, the couple adopted two siblings, Lewis (changed to John Jr.) and Shirley.

Dewey's interests and writings included many topics, and according to the Stanford Encyclopedia of Philosophy, "a substantial part of his published output consisted of commentary on current domestic and international politics, and public statements on behalf of many causes. (He is probably the only philosopher in this encyclopedia to have published both on the Treaty of Versailles and on the value of displaying art in post offices.)"

In 1917, Dewey met F. M. Alexander in New York City and later wrote introductions to Alexander's Man's Supreme Inheritance (1918), Constructive Conscious Control of the Individual (1923) and The Use of the Self (1932). Alexander's influence is referenced in Human Nature and Conduct and Experience and Nature. As well as his contacts with people mentioned elsewhere in the article, he also maintained correspondence with Henri Bergson, William M. Brown, Martin Buber, George S. Counts, William Rainey Harper, Sidney Hook, and George Santayana.

=== Death ===
Dewey died of pneumonia on June 1, 1952, at his home in New York City after years of ill-health and was cremated the next day.

== Psychology ==
=== Functional psychology ===
At the University of Michigan, Dewey published his first two books, Psychology (1887), and Leibniz's New Essays Concerning the Human Understanding (1888), both of which expressed Dewey's early commitment to British neo-Hegelianism. In Psychology, Dewey attempted a synthesis between idealism and experimental science.

While still professor of philosophy at Michigan, Dewey and his junior colleagues, James Hayden Tufts and George Herbert Mead, together with his student James Rowland Angell, all influenced strongly by the recent publication of William James' Principles of Psychology (1890), began to reformulate psychology, emphasizing the social environment on the activity of mind and behavior rather than the physiological psychology of Wilhelm Wundt and his followers.

By 1894, Dewey had joined Tufts, with whom he later wrote Ethics (1908) at the recently founded University of Chicago and invited Mead and Angell to follow him, the four men forming the basis of the so-called "Chicago group" of psychology.

Their new style of psychology, later dubbed functional psychology, had a practical emphasis on action and application. In Dewey's article "The Reflex Arc Concept in Psychology" which appeared in Psychological Review in 1896, he reasons against the traditional stimulus-response understanding of the reflex arc in favor of a "circular" account in which what serves as "stimulus" and what as "response" depends on how one considers the situation and defends the unitary nature of the sensory motor circuit. While he does not deny the existence of stimulus, sensation, and response, he disagreed that they were separate, juxtaposed events happening like links in a chain. He developed the idea that there is a coordination by which the stimulation is enriched by the results of previous experiences. The response is modulated by sensorial experience.

Dewey was elected president of the American Psychological Association in 1899.

Dewey also expressed interest in work in the psychology of visual perception performed by Dartmouth research professor Adelbert Ames Jr. He had great trouble with listening, however, because it is known Dewey could not distinguish musical pitches—in other words was an amusic.

== Philosophy ==
=== Education and teacher education ===
Dewey's educational theories were presented in My Pedagogic Creed (1897), The Primary-Education Fetich (1898), The School and Society (1900), The Child and the Curriculum (1902), Democracy and Education (1916), Schools of To-morrow (1915) with Evelyn Dewey, and Experience and Education (1938). Several themes recur throughout these writings. Dewey continually argues that education and learning are social and interactive processes, and thus the school itself is a social institution through which social reform can and should take place. In addition, he believed that students thrive in an environment where they are allowed to experience and interact with the curriculum, and all students should have the opportunity to take part in their own learning.

The ideas of democracy and social reform are continually discussed in Dewey's writings on education. Dewey makes a strong case for the importance of education not only as a place to gain content knowledge, but also as a place to learn how to live. In his eyes, the purpose of education should not revolve around the acquisition of a pre-determined set of skills, but rather the realization of one's full potential and the ability to use those skills for the greater good. He notes that "to prepare him for the future life means to give him command of himself; it means so to train him that he will have the full and ready use of all his capacities" (My Pedagogic Creed, Dewey, 1897).

In addition to helping students realize their full potential, Dewey goes on to acknowledge that education and schooling are instrumental in creating social change and reform. He notes that "education is a regulation of the process of coming to share in the social consciousness; and that the adjustment of individual activity on the basis of this social consciousness is the only sure method of social reconstruction".

In addition to his ideas regarding what education is and what effect it should have on society, Dewey also had specific notions regarding how education should take place within the classroom. In The Child and the Curriculum (1902), Dewey discusses two major conflicting schools of thought regarding educational pedagogy. The first is centered on the curriculum and focuses almost solely on the subject matter to be taught. Dewey argues that the major flaw in this methodology is the inactivity of the student; within this particular framework, "the child is simply the immature being who is to be matured; he is the superficial being who is to be deepened" (1902, p. 13). He argues that in order for education to be most effective, content must be presented in a way that allows the student to relate the information to prior experiences, thus deepening the connection with this new knowledge.

At the same time, Dewey was alarmed by many of the "child-centered" excesses of educational-school pedagogues who claimed to be his followers, and he argued that too much reliance on the child could be equally detrimental to the learning process. In this second school of thought, "we must take our stand with the child and our departure from him. It is he and not the subject-matter which determines both quality and quantity of learning" (Dewey, 1902, pp. 13–14). According to Dewey, the potential flaw in this line of thinking is that it minimizes the importance of the content as well as the role of the teacher.

In order to rectify this dilemma, Dewey advocated an educational structure that strikes a balance between delivering knowledge while also taking into account the interests and experiences of the student. He notes that "the child and the curriculum are simply two limits which define a single process. Just as two points define a straight line, so the present standpoint of the child and the facts and truths of studies define instruction" (Dewey, 1902, p. 16).

It is through this reasoning that Dewey became one of the most famous proponents of hands-on learning or experiential education, which is related to, but not synonymous with experiential learning. He argued that "if knowledge comes from the impressions made upon us by natural objects, it is impossible to procure knowledge without the use of objects which impress the mind" (Dewey, 1916/2009, pp. 217–18). Dewey's ideas went on to influence many other influential experiential models and advocates. Problem-Based Learning (PBL), for example, a method used widely in education today, incorporates Dewey's ideas pertaining to learning through active inquiry.

Dewey not only re-imagined the way that the learning process should take place, but also the role that the teacher should play within that process. Throughout the history of American schooling, education's purpose has been to train students for work by providing the student with a limited set of skills and information to do a particular job. The works of John Dewey provide the most prolific examples of how this limited vocational view of education has been applied to both the K–12 public education system and to the teacher training schools that attempted to quickly produce proficient and practical teachers with a limited set of instructional and discipline-specific skills needed to meet the needs of the employer and demands of the workforce.

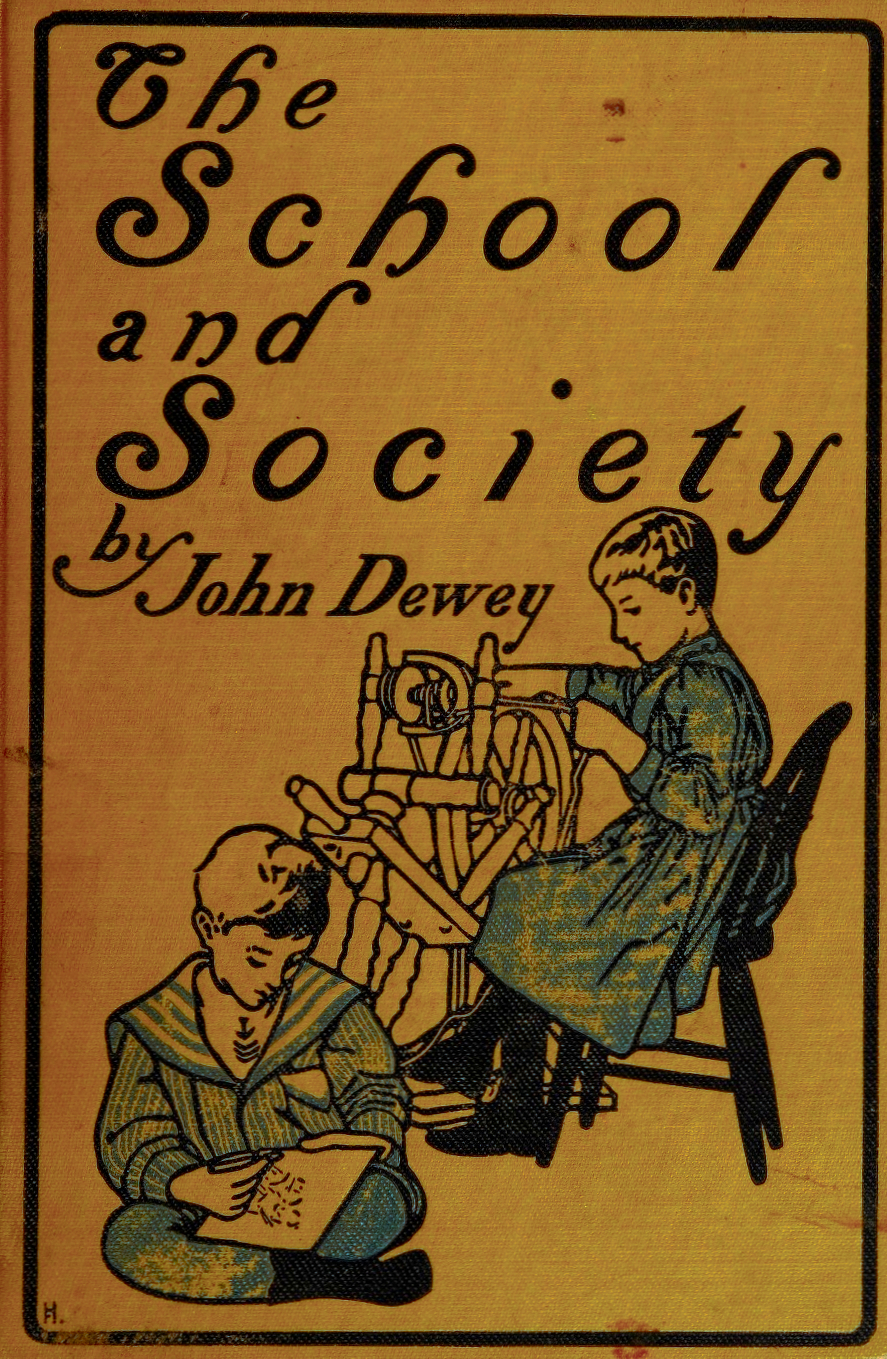

In The School and Society (Dewey, 1899) and Democracy of Education (Dewey, 1916), Dewey claims that rather than preparing citizens for ethical participation in society, schools cultivate passive pupils via insistence upon mastery of facts and disciplining of bodies. Rather than preparing students to be reflective, autonomous and ethical beings capable of arriving at social truths through critical and intersubjective discourse, schools prepare students for docile compliance with authoritarian work and political structures, discourage the pursuit of individual and communal inquiry, and perceive higher learning as a monopoly of the institution of education (Dewey, 1899; 1916).

For Dewey and his philosophical followers, education stifles individual autonomy when learners are taught that knowledge is transmitted in one direction, from the expert to the learner. Dewey not only re-imagined the way that the learning process should take place, but also the role that the teacher should play within that process. For Dewey, "The thing needful is improvement of education, not simply by turning out teachers who can do better the things that are not necessary to do, but rather by changing the conception of what constitutes education" (Dewey, 1904, p. 18).

Dewey's qualifications for teaching—a natural love for working with young children, a natural propensity to inquire about the subjects, methods and other social issues related to the profession, and a desire to share this acquired knowledge with others—are not a set of outwardly displayed mechanical skills. Rather, they may be viewed as internalized principles or habits which "work automatically, unconsciously" (Dewey, 1904, p. 15). Turning to Dewey's essays and public addresses regarding the teaching profession, followed by his analysis of the teacher as a person and a professional, as well as his beliefs regarding the responsibilities of teacher education programs to cultivate the attributes addressed, teacher educators can begin to reimagine the successful classroom teacher Dewey envisioned.

==== Professionalization of teaching as a social service ====
For many, education's purpose is to train students for work by providing the student with a limited set of skills and information to do a particular job. As Dewey notes, this limited vocational view is also applied to teacher training schools who attempt to quickly produce proficient and practical teachers with a limited set of instructional and discipline skills needed to meet the needs of the employer and demands of the workforce (Dewey, 1904). For Dewey, the school and the classroom teacher, as a workforce and provider of social service, have a unique responsibility to produce psychological and social goods that will lead to both present and future social progress.

As Dewey notes, "The business of the teacher is to produce a higher standard of intelligence in the community, and the object of the public school system is to make as large as possible the number of those who possess this intelligence. Skill, the ability to act wisely and effectively in a great variety of occupations and situations, is a sign and a criterion of the degree of civilization that a society has reached. It is the business of teachers to help in producing the many kinds of skills needed in contemporary life. If teachers are up to their work, they also aid in the production of character." (Dewey, TAP, 2010, pp. 241–42).

According to Dewey, the emphasis is placed on producing these attributes in children for use in their contemporary life because it is "impossible to foretell definitely just what civilization will be twenty years from now" (Dewey, MPC, 2010, p. 25). However, although Dewey is steadfast in his beliefs that education serves an immediate purpose (Dewey, DRT, 2010; Dewey, MPC, 2010; Dewey, TTP, 2010), he is not ignorant of the impact imparting these qualities of intelligence, skill, and character on young children in their present life will have on the future society. While addressing the state of educative and economic affairs during a 1935 radio broadcast, Dewey linked the ensuing economic depression to a "lack of sufficient production of intelligence, skill, and character" (Dewey, TAP, 2010, p. 242) of the nation's workforce.

As Dewey notes, there is a lack of these goods in the present society and teachers have a responsibility to create them in their students, who, we can assume, will grow into the adults who will ultimately go on to participate in whatever industrial or economic civilization awaits them. According to Dewey, the profession of the classroom teacher is to produce the intelligence, skill, and character within each student so that the democratic community is composed of citizens who can think, do and act intelligently and morally.

==== A teacher's knowledge ====
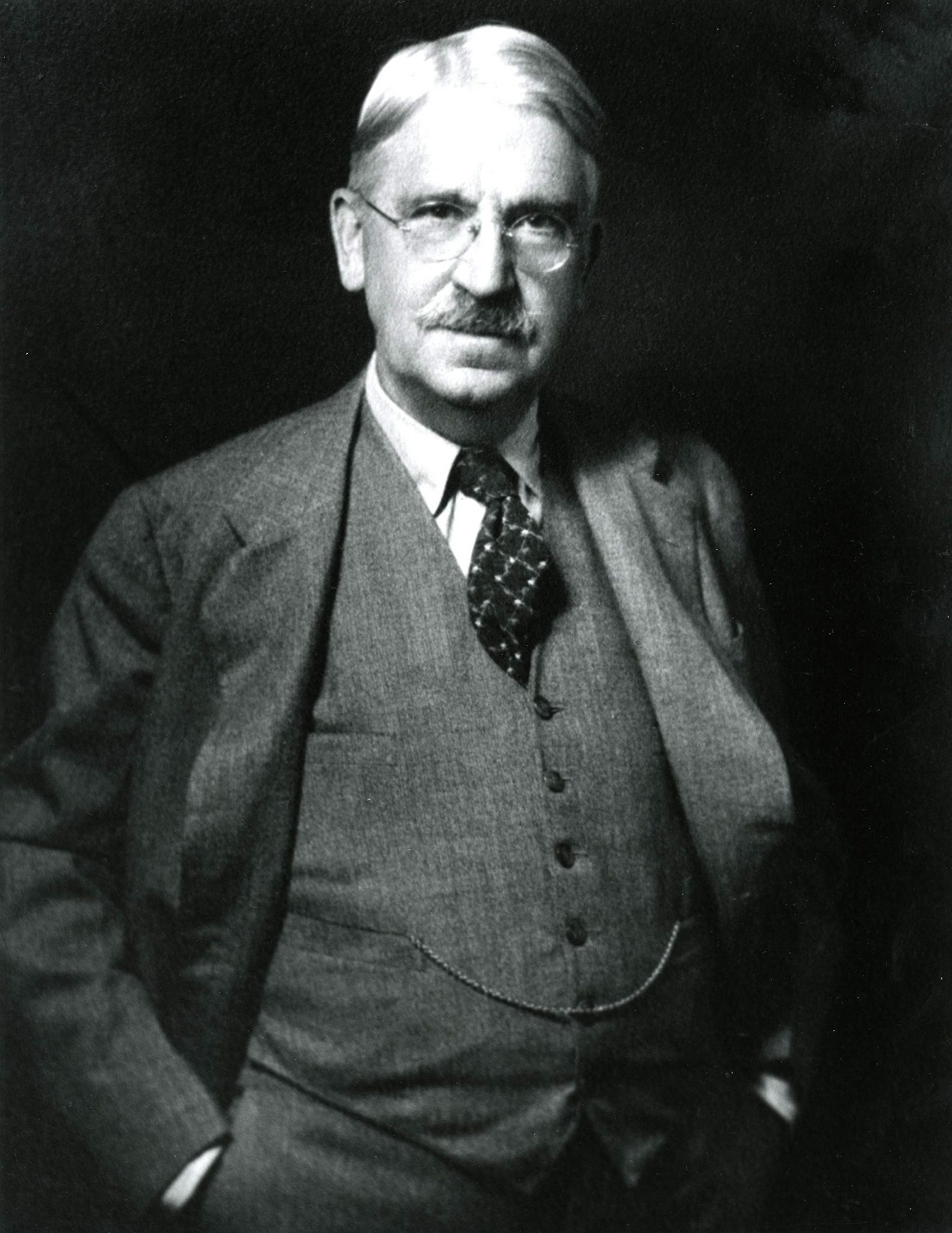
Portrait of Dewey

Dewey believed that successful classroom teachers possess a passion for knowledge and intellectual curiosity in the materials and methods they teach. For Dewey, this propensity is an inherent curiosity and love for learning that differs from one's ability to acquire, recite and reproduce textbook knowledge. "No one," according to Dewey, "can be really successful in performing the duties and meeting these demands [of teaching] who does not retain [their] intellectual curiosity intact throughout [their] entire career" (Dewey, APT, 2010, p. 34).

According to Dewey, it is not that the "teacher ought to strive to be a high-class scholar in all the subjects he or she has to teach," rather, "a teacher ought to have an unusual love and aptitude in some one subject: history, mathematics, literature, science, a fine art, or whatever" (Dewey, APT, 2010, p. 35). The classroom teacher does not have to be a scholar in all subjects; rather, genuine love in one will elicit a feel for genuine information and insight in all subjects taught.

In addition to this propensity for study into the subjects taught, the classroom teacher "is possessed by a recognition of the responsibility for the constant study of school room work, the constant study of children, of methods, of subject matter in its various adaptations to pupils" (Dewey, PST, 2010, p. 37). For Dewey, this desire for the lifelong pursuit of learning is inherent in other professions (e.g., the architectural, legal and medical fields; Dewey, 1904 & Dewey, PST, 2010), and has particular importance for the field of teaching. As Dewey notes, "this further study is not a sideline but something which fits directly into the demands and opportunities of the vocation" (Dewey, APT, 2010, p. 34).

According to Dewey, this propensity and passion for intellectual growth in the profession must be accompanied by a natural desire to communicate one's knowledge with others. "There are scholars who have [the knowledge] in a marked degree but who lack enthusiasm for imparting it. To the 'natural born' teacher learning is incomplete unless it is shared" (Dewey, APT, 2010, p. 35). For Dewey, it is not enough for the classroom teacher to be a lifelong learner of the techniques and subject-matter of education; she must aspire to share what she knows with others in her learning community.

==== A teacher's skill ====
The best indicator of teacher quality, according to Dewey, is the ability to watch and respond to the movement of the mind with keen awareness of the signs and quality of the responses his or her students exhibit with regard to the subject-matter presented (Dewey, APT, 2010; Dewey, 1904). As Dewey notes, "I have often been asked how it was that some teachers who have never studied the art of teaching are still extraordinarily good teachers. The explanation is simple. They have a quick, sure and unflagging sympathy with the operations and process of the minds they are in contact with. Their own minds move in harmony with those of others, appreciating their difficulties, entering into their problems, sharing their intellectual victories" (Dewey, APT, 2010, p. 36).

==== A teacher's disposition ====
As a result of the direct influence teachers have in shaping the mental, moral and spiritual lives of children during their most formative years, Dewey holds the profession of teaching in high esteem, often equating its social value to that of the ministry and to parenting (Dewey, APT, 2010; Dewey, DRT, 2010; Dewey, MPC, 2010; Dewey, PST, 2010; Dewey, TTC, 2010; Dewey, TTP, 2010). Perhaps the most important attributes, according to Dewey, are those personal inherent qualities that the teacher brings to the classroom. As Dewey notes, "no amount of learning or even of acquired pedagogical skill makes up for the deficiency" (Dewey, TLS, p. 25) of the personal traits needed to be most successful in the profession.

According to Dewey, the successful classroom teacher occupies an indispensable passion for promoting the intellectual growth of young children. In addition, they know that their career, in comparison to other professions, entails stressful situations, long hours, and limited financial reward; all of which have the potential to overcome their genuine love and sympathy for their students.

For Dewey, "One of the most depressing phases of the vocation is the number of careworn teachers one sees, with anxiety depicted on the lines of their faces, reflected in their strained high pitched voices and sharp manners. While contact with the young is a privilege for some temperaments, it is a tax on others and a tax which they do not bear up under very well. And in some schools, there are too many pupils to a teacher, too many subjects to teach, and adjustments to pupils are made in a mechanical rather than a human way. Human nature reacts against such unnatural conditions" (Dewey, APT, 2010, p. 35).

It is essential, according to Dewey, that the classroom teacher has the mental propensity to overcome the demands and stressors placed on them because the students can sense when their teacher is not genuinely invested in promoting their learning (Dewey, PST, 2010). Such negative demeanors, according to Dewey, prevent children from pursuing their own propensities for learning and intellectual growth. It can therefore be assumed that if teachers want their students to engage with the educational process and employ their natural curiosities for knowledge, teachers must be aware of how their reactions to young children and the stresses of teaching influence this process.

==== The role of teacher education to cultivate the professional classroom teacher ====
Dewey's passions for teaching—a natural love for working with young children, a natural propensity to inquire about the subjects, methods and other social issues related to the profession, and a desire to share this acquired knowledge with others—are not a set of outwardly displayed mechanical skills. Rather, they may be viewed as internalized principles or habits which "work automatically, unconsciously" (Dewey, 1904, p. 15). According to Dewey, teacher-education programs must turn away from focusing on producing proficient practitioners because such practical skills related to instruction and discipline (e.g., creating and delivering lesson plans, classroom management, implementation of an assortment of content-specific methods) can be learned over time during their everyday schoolwork with their students (Dewey, PST, 2010).

As Dewey notes, "The teacher who leaves the professional school with power in managing a class of children may appear to superior advantage the first day, the first week, the first month, or even the first year, as compared with some other teacher who has a much more vital command of the psychology, logic and ethics of development. But later 'progress' may consist only in perfecting and refining skill already possessed. Such persons seem to know how to teach, but they are not students of teaching. Even though they go on studying books of pedagogy, reading teachers' journals, attending teachers' institutes, etc., yet the root of the matter is not in them, unless they continue to be students of subject-matter, and students of mind-activity. Unless a teacher is such a student, he may continue to improve in the mechanics of school management, but he cannot grow as a teacher, an inspirer and director of soul-life" (Dewey, 1904, p. 15).

For Dewey, teacher education should focus not on producing persons who know how to teach as soon as they leave the program; rather, teacher education should be concerned with producing professional students of education who have the propensity to inquire about the subjects they teach, the methods used, and the activity of the mind as it gives and receives knowledge. According to Dewey, such a student is not superficially engaging with these materials, rather, the professional student of education has a genuine passion to inquire about the subjects of education, knowing that doing so ultimately leads to acquisitions of the skills related to teaching. Such students of education aspire for the intellectual growth within the profession that can only be achieved by immersing oneself in the lifelong pursuit of the intelligence, skills and character Dewey linked to the profession.

As Dewey notes, other professional fields, such as law and medicine cultivate a professional spirit in their fields to constantly study their work, their methods of their work, and a perpetual need for intellectual growth and concern for issues related to their profession. Teacher education, as a profession, has these same obligations (Dewey, 1904; Dewey, PST, 2010).

As Dewey notes, "An intellectual responsibility has got to be distributed to every human being who is concerned in carrying out the work in question, and to attempt to concentrate intellectual responsibility for a work that has to be done, with their brains and their hearts, by hundreds or thousands of people in a dozen or so at the top, no matter how wise and skillful they are, is not to concentrate responsibility—it is to diffuse irresponsibility" (Dewey, PST, 2010, p. 39). For Dewey, the professional spirit of teacher education requires of its students a constant study of school room work, constant study of children, of methods, of subject matter in its various adaptations to pupils. Such study will lead to professional enlightenment with regard to the daily operations of classroom teaching.

As well as his very active and direct involvement in setting up educational institutions such as the University of Chicago Laboratory Schools (1896) and The New School for Social Research (1919), many of Dewey's ideas influenced the founding of Bennington College and Goddard College in Vermont, where he served on the board of trustees. Dewey's works and philosophy also held great influence in the creation of the short-lived Black Mountain College in North Carolina, an experimental college focused on interdisciplinary study, and whose faculty included Buckminster Fuller, Willem de Kooning, Charles Olson, Franz Kline, Robert Duncan, Robert Creeley, and Paul Goodman, among others. Black Mountain College was the locus of the "Black Mountain Poets" a group of avant-garde poets closely linked with the Beat Generation and the San Francisco Renaissance.

=== Journalism ===
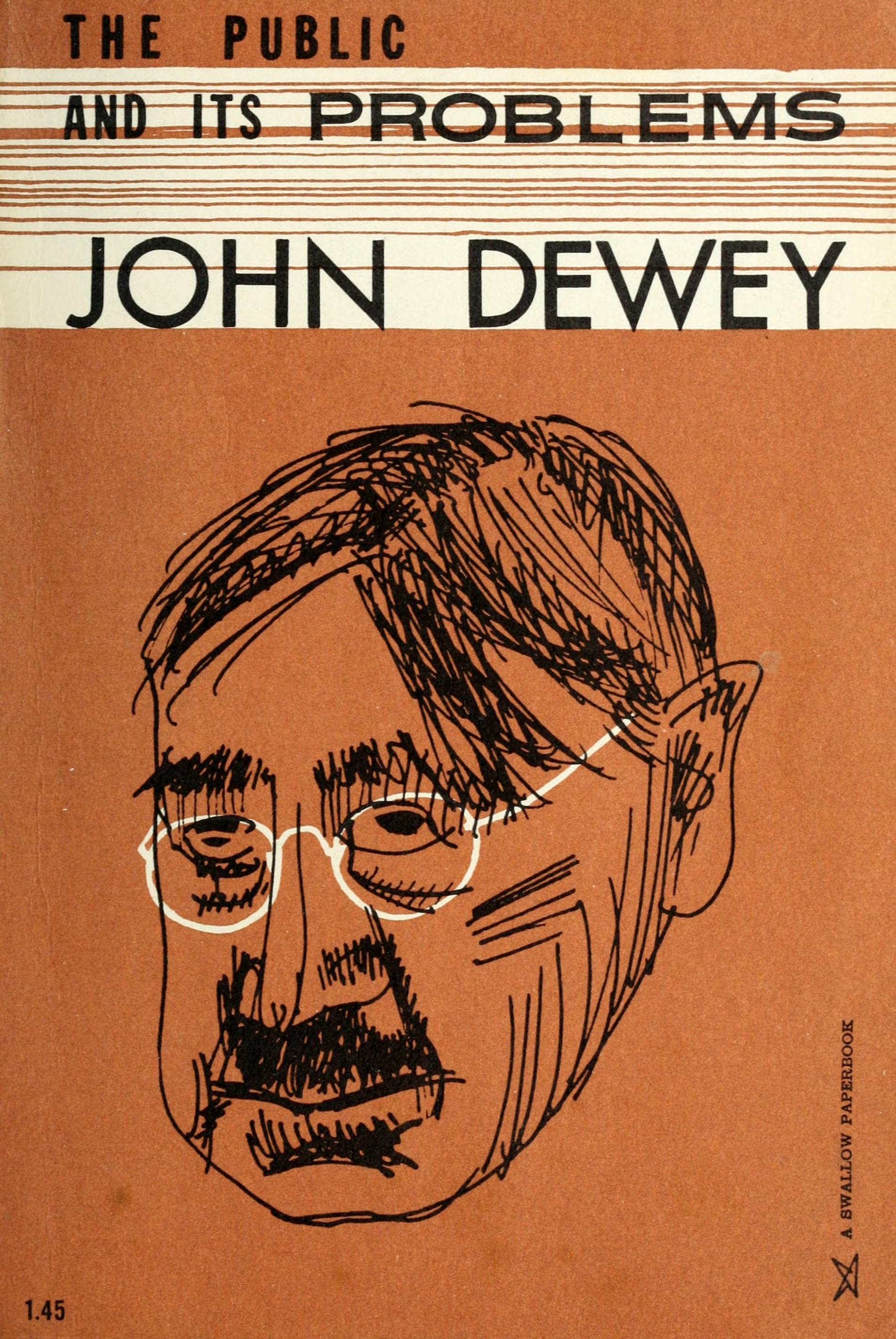

Dewey's definition of "public," as described in The Public and its Problems, has profound implications for the significance of journalism in society. As suggested by the title of the book, his concern was of the transactional relationship between publics and problems. Also implicit in its name, public journalism seeks to orient communication away from elite, corporate hegemony toward a civic public sphere. "The 'public' of public journalists is Dewey's public."

Dewey gives a concrete definition to the formation of a public. Publics are spontaneous groups of citizens who share the indirect effects of a particular action. Anyone affected by the indirect consequences of a specific action will automatically share a common interest in controlling those consequences, i.e., solving a common problem.
Since every action generates unintended consequences, publics continuously emerge, overlap, and disintegrate.

In The Public and its Problems, Dewey presents a rebuttal to Walter Lippmann's treatise on the role of journalism in democracy. Lippmann's model was a basic transmission model in which journalists took information given to them by experts and elites, repackaged that information in simple terms, and transmitted the information to the public, whose role was to react emotionally to the news. In his model, Lippmann supposed that the public was incapable of thought or action, and that all thought and action should be left to the experts and elites.

Dewey refutes this model by assuming that politics is the work and duty of each individual in the course of his daily routine. The knowledge needed to be involved in politics, in this model, was to be generated by the interaction of citizens, elites, experts, through the mediation and facilitation of journalism. In this model, not just the government is accountable, but the citizens, experts, and other actors as well.

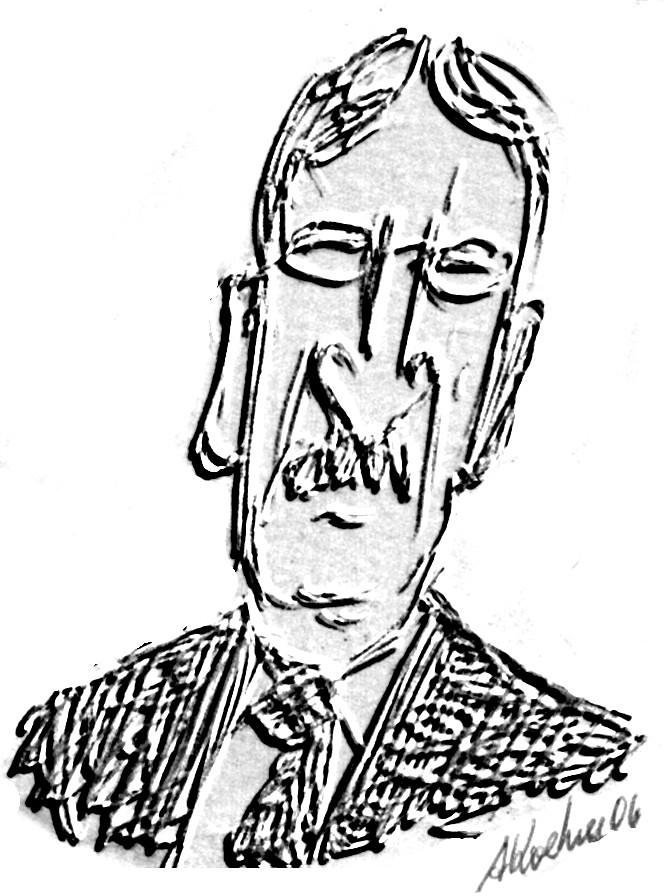
A caricature of Dewey by André Koehne, 2006

Dewey also said that journalism should conform to this ideal by changing its emphasis from actions or happenings (choosing a winner of a given situation) to alternatives, choices, consequences, and conditions, in order to foster conversation and improve the generation of knowledge. Journalism would not just produce a static product that told what had already happened, but the news would be in a constant state of evolution as the public added value by generating knowledge. The "audience" would end, to be replaced by citizens and collaborators who would essentially be users, doing more with the news than simply reading it. Concerning his effort to change journalism, he wrote in The Public and Its Problems: "Till the Great Society is converted in to a Great Community, the Public will remain in eclipse. Communication can alone create a great community" (Dewey, p. 142).

Dewey believed that communication creates a great community, and citizens who participate actively with public life contribute to that community. "The clear consciousness of a communal life, in all its implications, constitutes the idea of democracy." (The Public and its Problems, p. 149). This Great Community can only occur with "free and full intercommunication." (p. 211) Communication can be understood as journalism.

=== Logic and method ===
Dewey sees paradox in contemporary logical theory. Proximate subject matter garners general agreement and advancement, while the ultimate subject matter of logic generates unremitting controversy. In other words, he challenges confident logicians to answer the question of the truth of logical operators. Do they function merely as abstractions (e.g., pure mathematics) or do they connect in some essential way with their objects, and therefore alter or bring them to light?

Logical positivism also figured in Dewey's thought. About the movement he wrote that it "eschews the use of 'propositions' and 'terms', substituting 'sentences' and 'words'." ("General Theory of Propositions", in Logic: The Theory of Inquiry) He welcomes this changing of referents "in as far as it fixes attention upon the symbolic structure and content of propositions." However, he registers a small complaint against the use of "sentence" and "words" in that without careful interpretation the act or process of transposition "narrows unduly the scope of symbols and language, since it is not customary to treat gestures and diagrams (maps, blueprints, etc.) as words or sentences." In other words, sentences and words, considered in isolation, do not disclose intent, which may be inferred or "adjudged only by means of context."

Yet Dewey was not entirely opposed to modern logical trends; indeed, the deficiencies in traditional logic he expressed hope for the trends to solve occupies the whole first part of same book. Concerning traditional logic, he states there:

Aristotelian logic, which still passes current nominally, is a logic based upon the idea that qualitative objects are existential in the fullest sense. To retain logical principles based on this conception along with the acceptance of theories of existence and knowledge based on an opposite conception is not, to say the least, conductive to clearness—a consideration that has a good deal to do with existing dualism between traditional and the newer relational logics.

==== Critical thinking ====
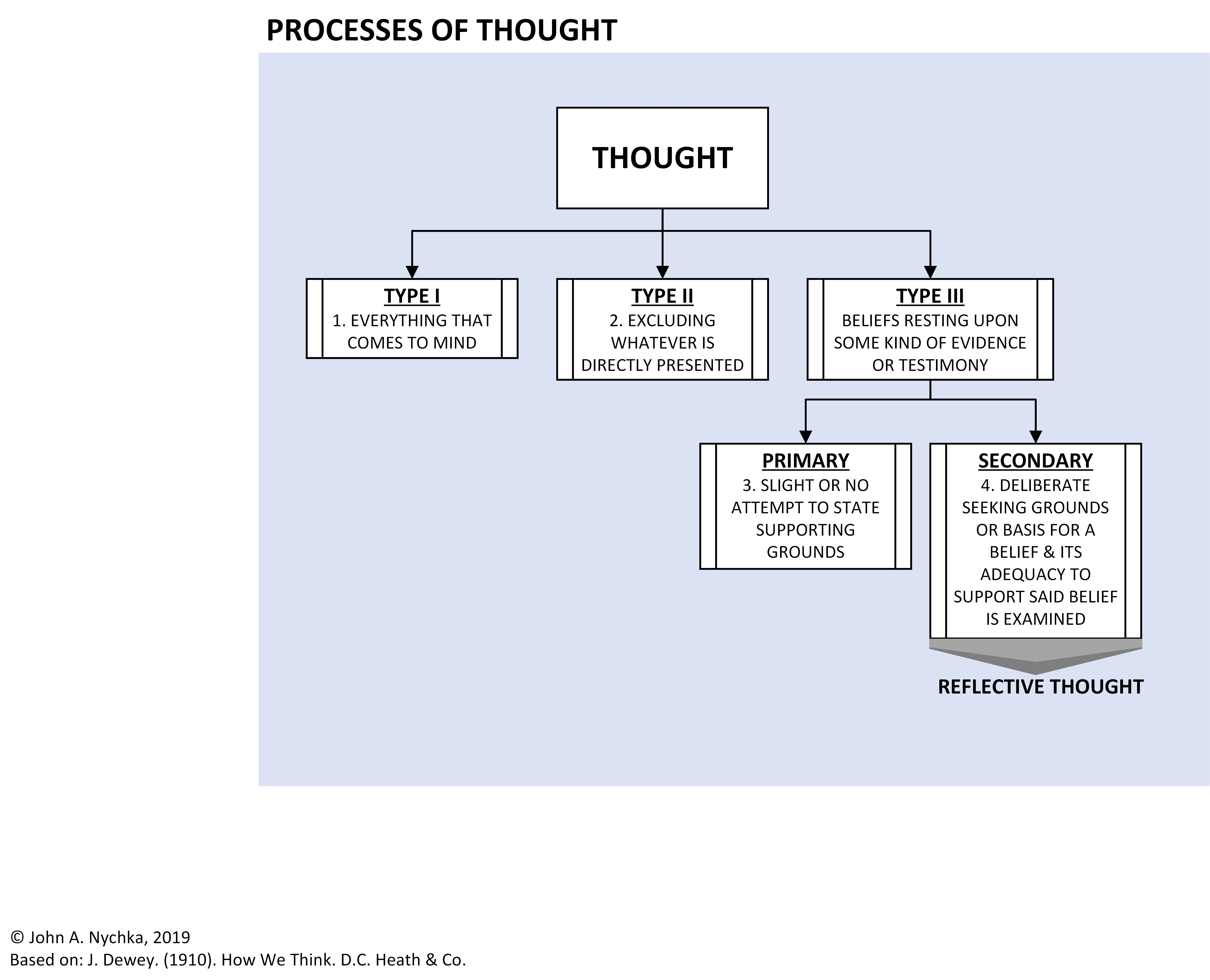
Based on the text of John Dewey in "How We Think", this diagram depicts different types of thinking.

Dewey was pivotal in advancing the philosophy of education by emphasizing the role of experience and active problem-solving in cultivating critical thinking. In "How We Think", Dewey describes reflective thinking as an "active, persistent, and careful consideration of any belief or supposed form of knowledge in the light of the grounds that support it and the further conclusions to which it tends." (Processes of Thought diagram). Thinking is not merely the passive absorption of facts but an active, dynamic process that involves questioning, analyzing, and transforming experiences into meaningful conclusions. Dewey's approach transformed traditional education by advocating for an interactive classroom environment. His contributions laid the groundwork for modern pedagogical methods that not only focus on the acquisition of factual knowledge but also foster the development of independent thought, creativity, and a deeper understanding of how to apply learning in everyday life.

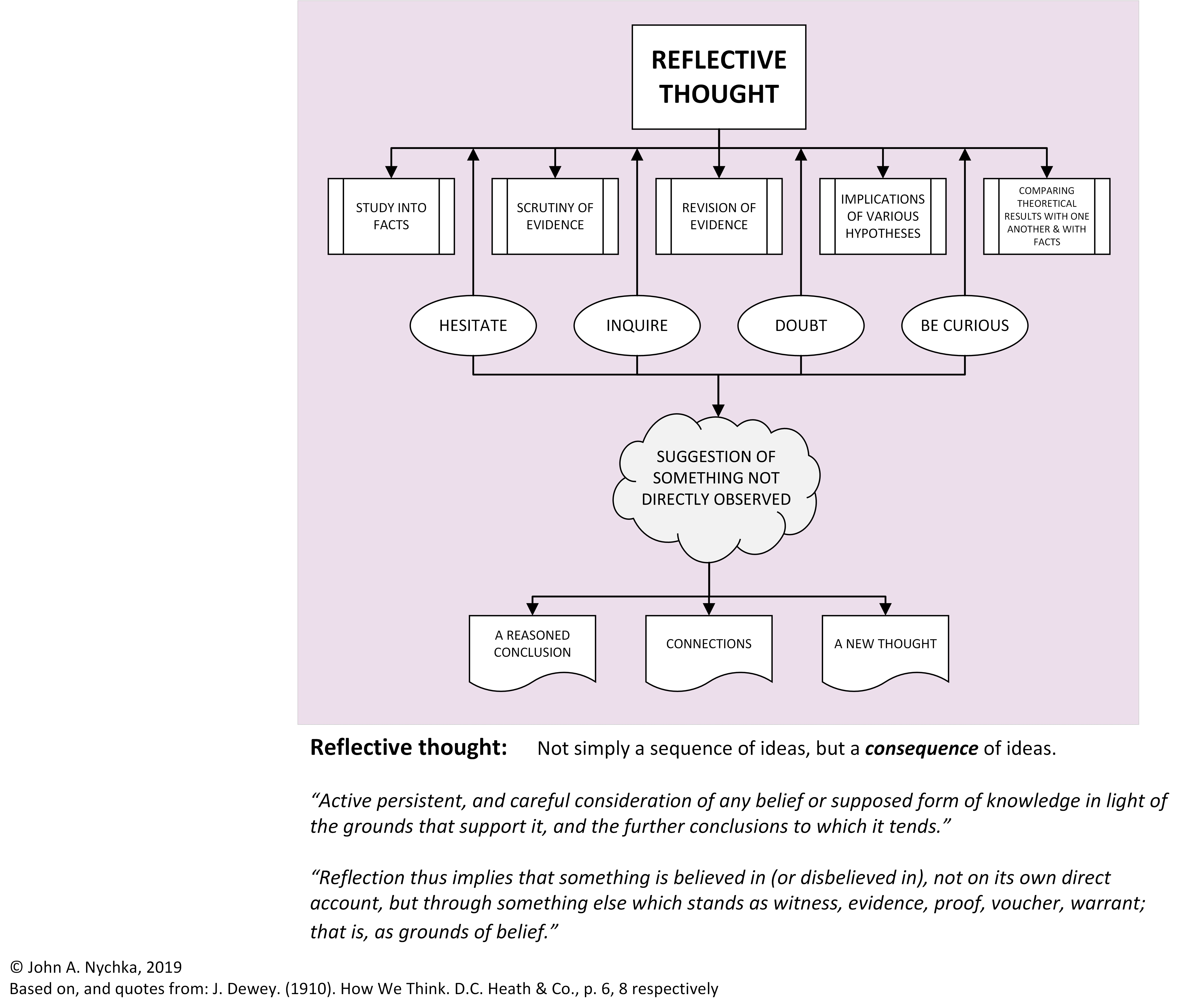
Based on the text of John Dewey in "How We Think", this diagram details the elements and strategies for critical reflective thinking.

Many authors thus regard Dewey as a key figure in affirming the importance of critical thinking in education. Dewey used the term "critical thinking" in the first edition of his book How We Think, but the term did not originate with Dewey.

In "How We Think", Dewey also delved further into the design of learning experiences to encourage reflective thinking. Moreover, Dewey described his vision for the design of poorly executed thinking and well executed thinking processes –the difference being the exclusion or inclusion of reflective thought, respectively. He also detailed the design of sub-processes within reflective thought, which consist of skepticism and investigation to either find facts and evidence to support or nullify suggested beliefs.

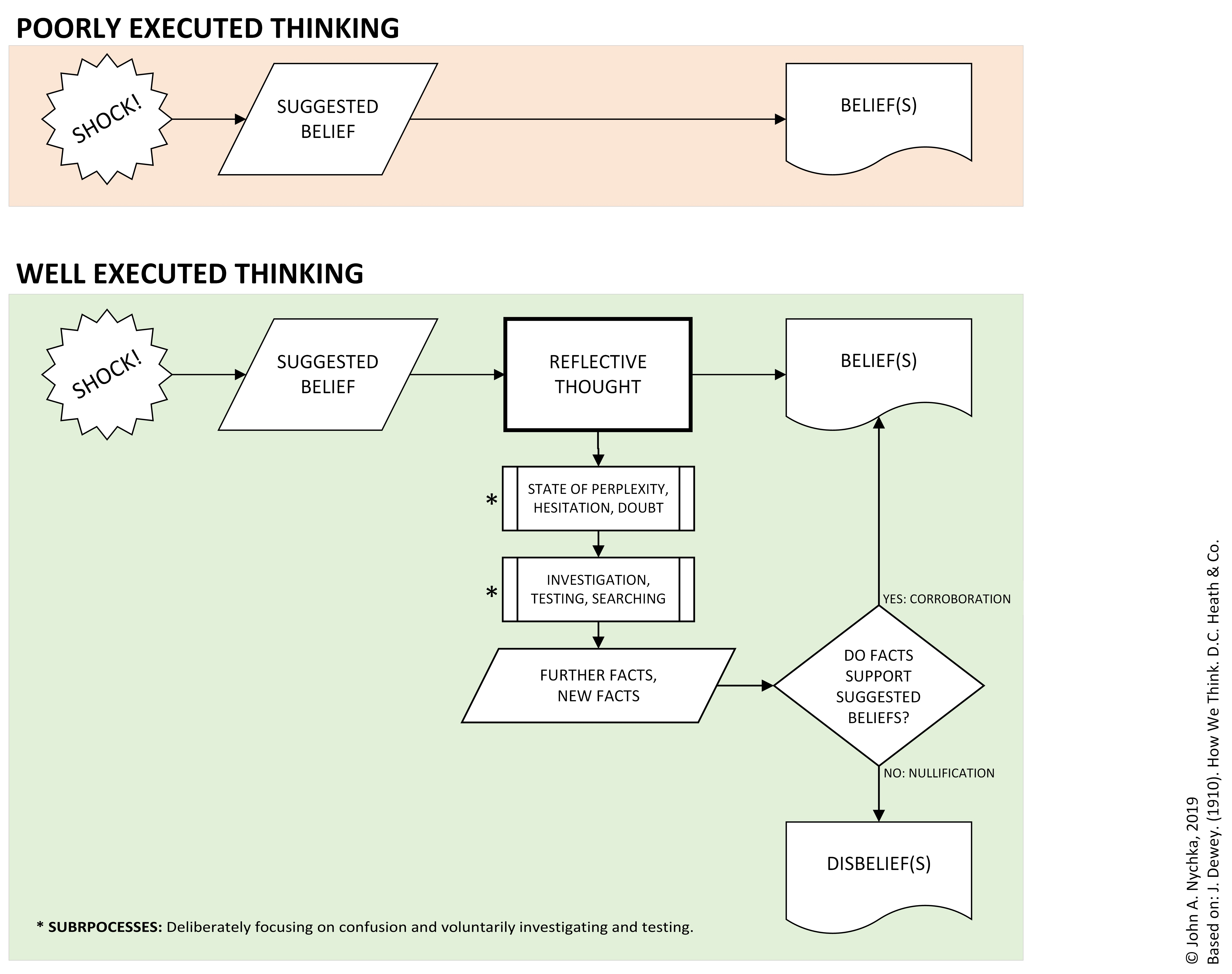
Based on the text of John Dewey in "How We Think", this diagram summarizes the design of, or suggested, thinking processes of which poorly executed and well executed thinking.

==== Aesthetics ====
Art as Experience (1934) is Dewey's major writing on aesthetics.

It is, in accordance with his place in the Pragmatist tradition that emphasizes community, a study of the individual art object as embedded in (and inextricable from) the experiences of a local culture. In the original illustrated edition, Dewey drew on the modern art and world cultures collection assembled by Albert C. Barnes at the Barnes Foundation, whose own ideas on the application of art to one's way of life was influenced by Dewey's writing. Dewey made art through writing poetry, but he considered himself deeply unmusical: one of his students described Dewey as "allergic to music." Barnes was particularly influenced by Democracy and Education (1916) and then attended Dewey's seminar on political philosophy at Columbia University in the fall semester of 1918.

=== Philanthropy, women and democracy ===
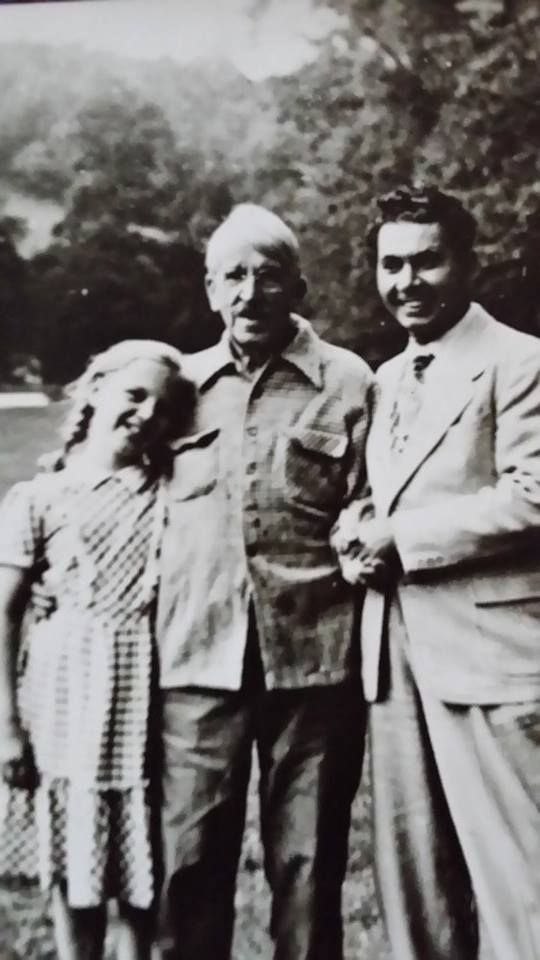
Dewey with his Iraqi friend and student, Nuri Ja'far, 1949

Dewey founded the University of Chicago laboratory school, supported educational organizations, and supported settlement houses especially Jane Addams' Hull House. John Dewey and Jane Addams influenced each other's expansive theory of democracy.

Through his work at the Hull House serving on its first board of trustees, Dewey was not only an activist for the cause but also a partner working to serve the large immigrant community of Chicago and women's suffrage. Dewey experienced the lack of children's education while contributing in the classroom at the Hull House. There he also experienced the lack of education and skills of immigrant women. Stengel argues:

Addams is unquestionably a maker of democratic community and pragmatic education; Dewey is just as unquestionably a reflector. Through her work at Hull House, Addams discerned the shape of democracy as a mode of associated living and uncovered the outlines of an experimental approach to knowledge and understanding; Dewey analyzed and classified the social, psychological and educational processes Addams lived.

His leading views on democracy included:

First, Dewey believed that democracy is an ethical ideal rather than merely a political arrangement. Second, he considered participation, not representation, the essence of democracy. Third, he insisted on the harmony between democracy and the scientific method: ever-expanding and self-critical communities of inquiry, operating on pragmatic principles and constantly revising their beliefs in light of new evidence, provided Dewey with a model for democratic decision making ... Finally, Dewey called for extending democracy, conceived as an ethical project, from politics to industry and society.

This helped to shape his understanding of human action and the unity of human experience.

Dewey believed that a woman's place in society was determined by her environment and not just her biology. On women he says, "You think too much of women in terms of sex. Think of them as human individuals for a while, dropping out the sex qualification, and you won't be so sure of some of your generalizations about what they should and shouldn't do". John Dewey's support helped to increase the support and popularity of Jane Addams' Hull House and other settlement houses as well. With growing support, involvement of the community grew as well as the support for the women's suffrage movement.

As commonly argued by Dewey's greatest critics, he was not able to come up with strategies in order to fulfill his ideas that would lead to a successful democracy, educational system, and a successful women's suffrage movement. While knowing that traditional beliefs, customs, and practices needed to be examined in order to find out what worked and what needed improved upon, it was never done in a systematic way. "Dewey became increasingly aware of the obstacles presented by entrenched power and alert to the intricacy of the problems facing modern cultures". With the complex of society at the time, Dewey was criticized for his lack of effort in fixing the problems.

With respect to technological developments in a democracy:

Persons do not become a society by living in physical proximity any more than a man ceases to be socially influenced by being so many feet or miles removed from others.

His work on democracy influenced B. R. Ambedkar, one of his students, who later served as a Law and Justice Minister of India.

=== Religion ===
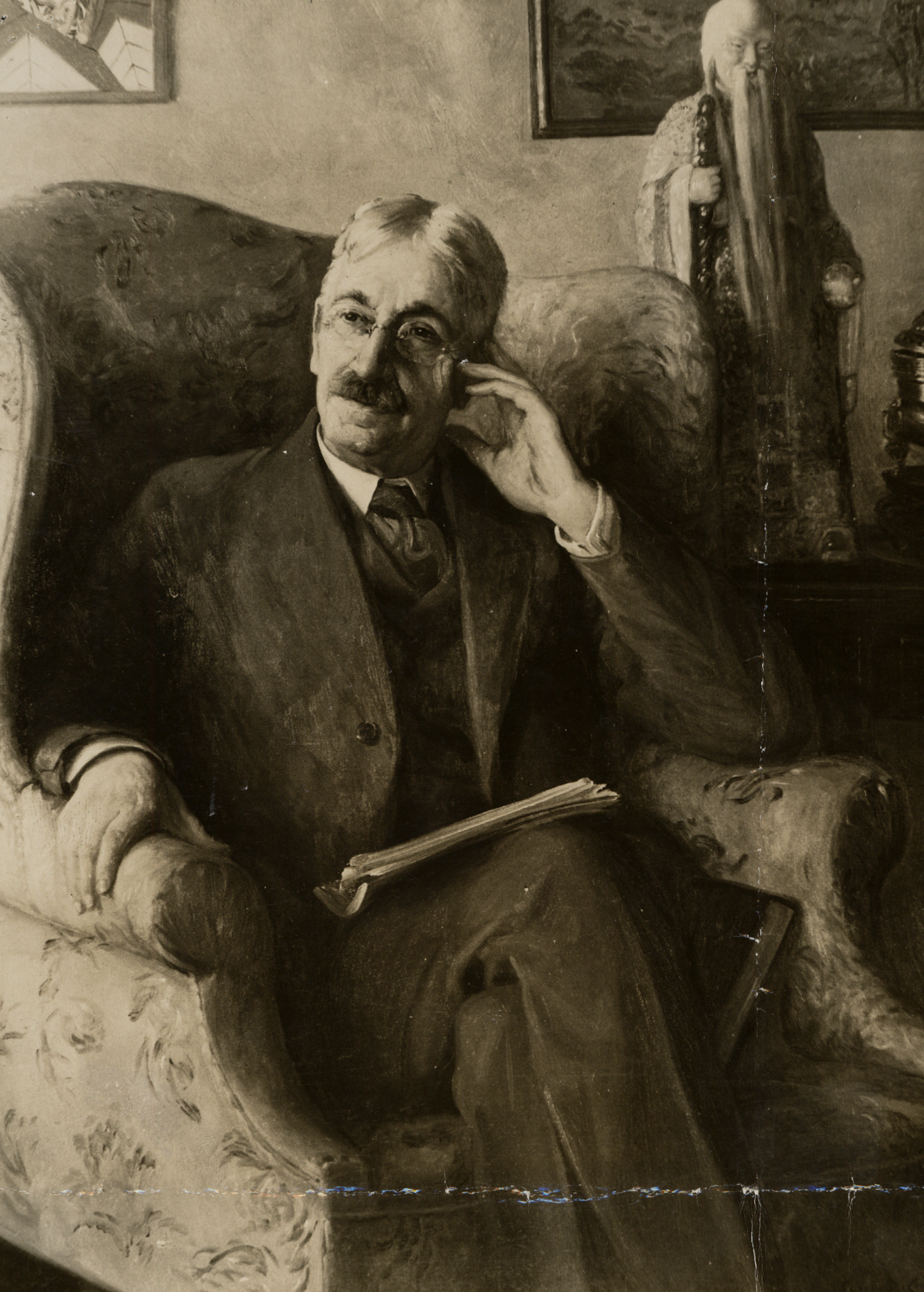
Portrait of Dewey

Historians have examined his religious beliefs. Biographer Steven Clark Rockefeller traced Dewey's democratic convictions to his childhood attendance at the Congregational Church, with its strong proclamation of social ideals and the Social Gospel. Historian Edward A. White suggested in Science and Religion in American Thought (1952) that Dewey's work led to the 20th-century rift between religion and science.

Dewey went through an "evangelical" development as a child. As an adult he was negative, or at most neutral, about theology in education. He instead took a meliorist position with the goal of scientific humanism and educational and social reform without recourse to religion.

As an atheist and a secular humanist in his later life, Dewey participated with a variety of humanistic activities from the 1930s into the 1950s, which included sitting on the advisory board of Charles Francis Potter's First Humanist Society of New York (1929); being one of the original 34 signatories of the first Humanist Manifesto (1933) and being elected an honorary member of the Humanist Press Association (1936).

His opinion of humanism is summarized in his own words from an article titled "What Humanism Means to Me", published in the June 1930 edition of Thinker 2:

What Humanism means to me is an expansion, not a contraction, of human life, an expansion in which nature and the science of nature are made the willing servants of human good.

=== Pragmatism, instrumentalism, consequentialism ===
Dewey sometimes referred to his philosophy as instrumentalism rather than pragmatism. In some phrases introducing a book he wrote later in life meant to help forestay a wandering kind of criticism of the work based on the controversies due to the differences in the schools that he sometimes invoked, he defined at the same time with precise brevity the criterion of validity common to these three schools, which lack agreed-upon definitions:

But in the proper interpretation of "pragmatic," namely the function of consequences as necessary tests of the validity of propositions, provided these consequences are operationally instituted and are such as to resolve the specific problem evoking the operations, the text that follows is thoroughly pragmatic.

His concern for precise definition led him to detailed analysis of careless word usage, reported in Knowing and the Known in 1949.

Dewey also regularly refers and discusses the definitions of pragmatism used by other philosophers within the movement such as Charles Peirce and William James when trying to pin down his own definitions in his Essays in Experimental Logic. Regarding Peirce he writes "Mr. Peirce explained that he took the term 'pragmatic' from Kant, in order to denote empirical consequences." Following this statement he also introduces James' usage of the term pragmatism when he writes "what is important is that the consequences should be specific... When he [James] said that general notions must 'cash in', he meant of course that they must be translatable into verifiable specific things.

==== Epistemology ====
The terminology problem in the fields of epistemology and logic is partially due, according to Dewey and Bentley, to inefficient and imprecise use of words and concepts that reflect three historic levels of organization and presentation. In the order of chronological appearance, these are:

- Self-Action: Prescientific concepts regarded humans, animals, and things as possessing powers of their own which initiated or caused their actions.
- Interaction: as described by Newton, where things, living and inorganic, are balanced against something in a system of interaction, for example, the third law of motion states that for every action there is an equal and opposite reaction.
- Transaction: where modern systems of descriptions and naming are employed to deal with multiple aspects and phases of action without any attribution to ultimate, final, or independent entities, essences, or realities.

A series of characterizations of Transactions indicate the wide range of considerations involved.

== Activism ==
=== 1894 Pullman Strike ===
While Dewey was at the University of Chicago, his letters to his wife Alice and his colleague Jane Addams reveal that he closely followed the 1894 Pullman Strike, in which the employees of the Pullman Palace Car Factory in Chicago decided to go on strike after industrialist George Pullman refused to lower rents in his company town after cutting his workers' wages by nearly 30 percent. On May 11, 1894, the strike became official, later gaining the support of the members of the American Railway Union, whose leader Eugene V. Debs called for a nationwide boycott of all trains including Pullman sleeping cars.

Considering most trains had Pullman cars, the main 24 lines out of Chicago were halted and the mail was stopped as the workers destroyed trains all over the United States. President Grover Cleveland used the mail as a justification to send in the National Guard, and ARU leader Eugene Debs was arrested.

Dewey wrote to Alice: "The only wonder is that when the 'higher classes' – damn them – take such views there aren't more downright socialists. [...] [T]hat a representative journal of the upper classes – damn them again – can take the attitude of that harper's weekly", referring to headlines such as "Monopoly" and "Repress the Rebellion", which claimed, in Dewey's words, to support the sensational belief that Debs was a "criminal" inspiring hate and violence in the equally "criminal" working classes. He concluded: "It shows what it is to be a higher class. And I fear Chicago Univ. is a capitalistic institution – that is, it too belongs to the higher classes."

=== Pro-war stance in First World War ===
Dewey was an advocate of US participation in the First World War. For this he was criticised by Randolph Bourne, a former student whose essay "Twilight of Idols", was published in the literary journal Seven Arts in October 1917. Bourne criticised Dewey's instrumental pragmatist philosophy.

=== International League for Academic Freedom ===
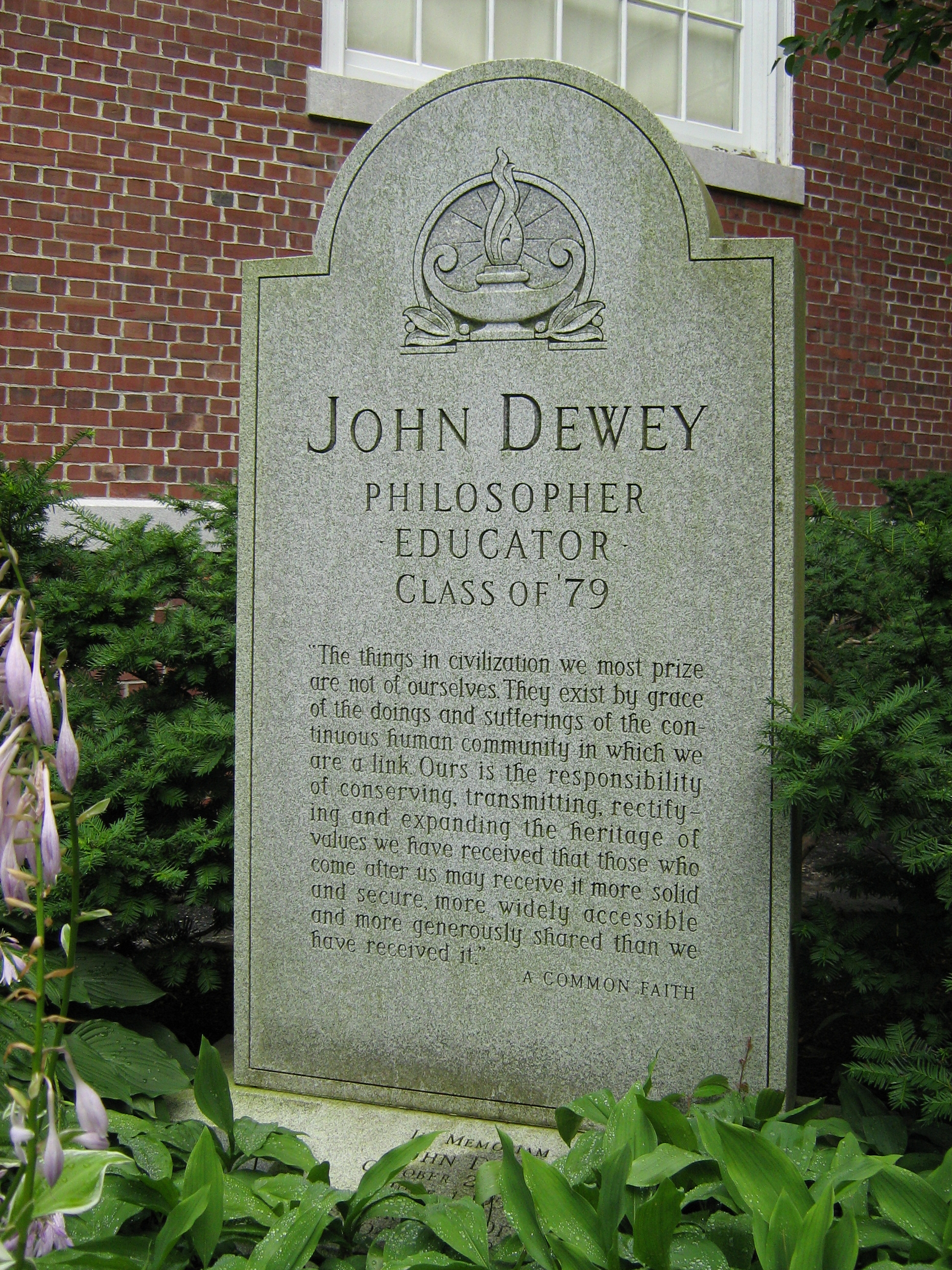
The grave of Dewey and his wife in an alcove on the north side of the Ira Allen Chapel in Burlington, Vermont. It is the only grave on the University of Vermont campus.

As a major advocate of academic freedom, in 1935 Dewey, together with Albert Einstein and Alvin Johnson, became a member of the United States section of the International League for Academic Freedom, and in 1940, together with Horace Kallen, edited a series of articles related to the Bertrand Russell Case.

=== Dewey Commission ===
He directed the famous Dewey Commission held in Mexico in 1937, which cleared Leon Trotsky of the charges made against him by Joseph Stalin, and marched for women's rights, among many other causes.

=== League for Industrial Democracy ===
In 1939, Dewey was elected President of the League for Industrial Democracy, an organization with the goal of educating college students about the labor movement. The Student Branch of the L.I.D. later became the Students for a Democratic Society.

As well as defending the independence of teachers and opposing a communist takeover of the New York Teachers' Union, Dewey was involved in the organization that eventually became the National Association for the Advancement of Colored People, sitting as an executive on the NAACP's early executive board.

He was an avid supporter of Henry George's proposal for taxing land values. Of George, he wrote, "No man, no graduate of a higher educational institution, has a right to regard himself as an educated man in social thought unless he has some first-hand acquaintance with the theoretical contribution of this great American thinker." As honorary president of the Henry George School of Social Science, he wrote a letter to Henry Ford urging him to support the school.

== Awards and honors ==
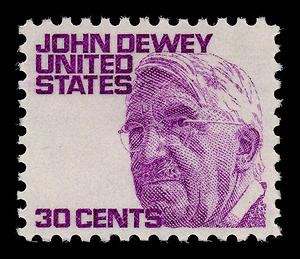
Dewey featured on a United States 30-cents stamp (21 October 21, 1968)

- Elected member of the United States National Academy of Sciences (1910)
- Elected member of the American Philosophical Society (1911)
- Copernican Citation (1943)
- Doctor "honoris causa" – University of Oslo (1946); University of Pennsylvania (1946); Yale University (1951); University of Rome (1951)
- Dewey University in Puerto Rico is a private university named for Dewey.
- John Dewey High School in Brooklyn, New York is named after him.
- John Dewey Academy of Learning in Green Bay, Wisconsin is a charter school named after him.
- The John Dewey Academy in Great Barrington, MA is a college preparatory therapeutic boarding school for troubled adolescents.
- John Dewey Elementary School in Warrensville Hts., Ohio, an Eastern Suburb of Cleveland, Ohio, is named after him.
- John Dewey Middle School in Adams County in Denver, Colorado is a junior high school named after him.
- Dewey Hall, a building on the campus of the University of Vermont is named after him.
- The United States Postal Service honored Dewey with a Prominent Americans series 30¢ postage stamp in 1968.

== Works ==
Besides publishing prolifically himself, Dewey also sat on the boards of scientific publications such as Sociometry (advisory board, 1942) and The Journal of Social Psychology (editorial board, 1942), as well as having posts at other publications such as The New Leader (contributing editor, 1949).

The following publications by John Dewey are referenced or mentioned in this article. A more complete list of his publications may be found at John Dewey bibliography.

- "The New Psychology ", Andover Review, 2, 278–89 (1884)
- Psychology (1887)
- Leibniz's New Essays Concerning the Human Understanding (1888)
- "The Ego as Cause " Philosophical Review, 3, 337–41 (June 24, 1894)
- "The Reflex Arc Concept in Psychology" (1896)
- "My Pedagogic Creed" (1897)
- The School and Society (1899)
- The Child and the Curriculum (1902)
- The Relation of Theory to Practice in Education (1904)
- "The Postulate of Immediate Empiricism" (1905)
- Moral Principles in Education (1909), The Riverside Press Cambridge, Project Gutenberg
- How We Think (1910)
- German Philosophy and Politics (1915)
- Democracy and Education: an introduction to the philosophy of education (1916)
- Reconstruction in Philosophy (1920)
- Letters from China and Japan (1920) online
- China, Japan and the U.S.A. (1921) online
- Human Nature and Conduct public domain audiobook at LibriVox, An Introduction to Social Psychology (1922) Parts 1–4
- Experience and Nature (1925)
- The Public and its Problems (1927)
- The Quest for Certainty, Gifford Lectures (1929)
- The Sources of a Science of Education (1929), The Kappa Delta Pi Lecture Series
- Individualism Old and New (1930)
- Philosophy and Civilization (1931)
- Ethics, second edition (with James Hayden Tufts) (1932)
- Art as Experience (1934)
- A Common Faith (1934)
- Liberalism and Social Action (1935)
- Experience and Education (1938)
- Logic: The Theory of Inquiry (1938)
- Freedom and Culture (1939)
- Theory of Valuation (1939). ISBN 0-226-57594-2
- Knowing and the Known (1949)
- Unmodern Philosophy and Modern Philosophy ISBN 0809330792 (Lost in 1947, finally published in 2012)
- Lectures in China, 1919–1920 lost; finally published 1973; online

See also

- The Philosophy of John Dewey, Edited by John J. McDermott. University of Chicago Press, 1981.
- The Essential Dewey: Volumes 1 and 2. Edited by Larry Hickman and Thomas Alexander. Indiana University Press, 1998.
- "To those who aspire to the profession of teaching" (APT). In Simpson, D.J., & Stack, S.F. (eds.), Teachers, leaders and schools: Essays by John Dewey (33–36). Carbonale, IL: Southern Illinois University Press, 2010.
- "The classroom teacher" (CRT). In Simpson, D.J., & Stack, S.F. (eds.), Teachers, leaders and schools: Essays by John Dewey (153–60). Carbonale, IL: Southern Illinois University Press, 2010.
- "The duties and responsibilities of the teaching profession" (DRT). In Simpson, D.J., & Stack, S.F. (eds.), Teachers, leaders and schools: Essays by John Dewey (245–48). Carbonale, IL: Southern Illinois University Press, 2010.
- "The educational balance, efficiency and thinking" (EET). In Simpson, D.J., & Stack, S.F. (eds.), Teachers, leaders and schools: Essays by John Dewey (41–45). Carbonale, IL: Southern Illinois University Press, 2010.
- "My pedagogic creed" (MPC). In Simpson, D.J., & Stack, S.F. (eds.), Teachers, leaders and schools: Essays by John Dewey (24–32). Carbonale, IL: Southern Illinois University Press, 2010.
- "Professional spirit among teachers" (PST). In Simpson, D.J., & Stack, S.F. (eds.), Teachers, leaders and schools: Essays by John Dewey (37–40). Carbonale, IL: Southern Illinois University Press, 2010.
- "The teacher and the public" (TAP). In Simpson, D.J., & Stack, S.F. (eds.), Teachers, leaders and schools: Essays by John Dewey (214–44). Carbonale, IL: Southern Illinois University Press, 2010.

Dewey's Complete Writings is available in four multi-volume sets (38 volumes in all) from Southern Illinois University Press:

- The Early Works: 1892–1898 (5 volumes)
- The Middle Works: 1899–1924 (15 volumes)
- The Later Works: 1925–1953 (17 volumes)
- Supplementary Volume 1: 1884–1951

The Collected Works of John Dewey: 1882–1953 , The Correspondence of John Dewey 1871–1952 , and The Lectures of John Dewey are available online via monographic purchase to academic institutions and via subscription to individuals, and also in TEI format for university servers in the Past Masters series. (The CD-ROM has been discontinued.)

== See also ==
- Center for Dewey Studies
- Democratic education
- Dewey Commission
- Inquiry-based learning
- Instrumental and value-rational action
- John Dewey Society
- Kilpatrick, William Heard
- League for Independent Political Action
- Lippmann–Dewey Debate
- Malting House School
- Pragmatic ethics
- Village Institutes
