= Evelyn Dewey =

American education reformer and activist (1889–1965)

Evelyn Riggs Dewey (March 5, 1889– March 12, 1965) was an American education reformer and social activist and author of several books on education. Prior to her education work, she was involved in the Women's Trade Union League, particularly concerning the New York shirtwaist strike of 1909. She was the daughter of the philosopher, psychologist, and education reformer John Dewey and the educator Alice Chipman Dewey.

== Life and work ==
Dewey was born in 1889, the second of six children born to the educationalists John Dewey and Alice Chipman Dewey. In 1909, she was studying at Barnard College, New York City, during the time she was involved in the Women's Trade Union League (WTUL) and supported the New York shirtwaist strike of 1909.

Evelyn traveled in Europe with her parents, visiting Montessori schools, and in the winter of 1914, she and her parents met Maria Montessori, to whom they were introduced by Evelyn's college roommate, the Montessori teacher Margaret Naumburg. While satisfied by what they saw at the schools, neither Evelyn nor her mother seemed impressed by Montessori herself. It was following this visit, and the visit of her father and adopted brother, Sabino, to the Marietta Johnson School of Organic Education, that Evelyn and John Dewey decided on a survey of experimental schools in the US, such as those run by William Wirt in Gary, Indiana. This was published in 1915 as Schools of To-morrow, one of the key texts of educational reform. Evelyn was probably responsible for the descriptive chapters in Schools of To-morrow, in which the phrase 'learning by doing' is first used to describe the educational approach taken in some of the schools that the Deweys admired.

Around the time of the publication of Schools of To-Morrow Evelyn Dewey started working administering IQ tests at the Public Education Association of the City of New York (PEA) Psychological Survey, where she was one of several supporters of the WTUL who worked under Lucy Sprague Mitchell. In 1916, Sprague Mitchell, Caroline Pratt and Harriet Merrill Johnson founded the Bureau of Educational Experiments (BEE), of which Evelyn Dewey was one of 12 charter members. At the BEE, Dewey ran experiments renovating rural schools and running school farms, which she reported in her 1920 book New Schools for Old.

Dewey left the BEE in 1919, and worked on editing her parents' Letters from China and Japan. She was married in 1932 to Granville Smith Jr., and continued to speak and write on education in the 1920s and 30s under her maiden name. She died in 1965.

== Publications ==
- Dewey, John; Dewey, Evelyn (1915). Schools Of To-morrow. New York: E. P. Dutton – via Internet Archive.
- Dewey, Evelyn (1919). New schools for old: the regeneration of the Porter School. New York: E. P. Dutton – via Internet Archive.
- Dewey, John; Dewey, Alice Chipman (January 5, 1920). Dewey, Evelyn (ed.). Letters from China and Japan. New York: E.P. Dutton – via Project Gutenberg.
- Dewey, Evelyn; Child, Emily; Ruml, Beardsley (1920). Methods And Results Of Testing School Children: Manual of Tests Used by the Psychological Survey in the Public Schools of New York City Including Social and Physical Studies of the Children Tested. New York: E.P. Dutton – via Internet Archive.
- Dewey, Evelyn (1922). The Dalton Laboratory Plan. London: J.M. Dent Sons – via Internet Archive.
- Dewey, Evelyn; Glover, Katherine (1934). Children of the New Day. New York: D. Appleton-Century Co., Inc. – via Google Books.
- Dewey, Evelyn (1935). Behavior Development in Infants. A Survey of the Literature on Prenatal and Postnatal Activity, 1920-1934. New York: Columbia University Press. ISBN 978-0-405-03142-7 – via Google Books.
