= Science and Religion in American Thought =

1952 book by Edward A. White

Science and Religion in American Thought (1952) is a book by Edward A. White, a Stanford University history professor. In 1952, the first edition was simultaneously published by both Stanford University Press in Stanford, California and Oxford University Press in London, England. Key figures historically illustrated in the text are John William Draper, a late 19th-century positivist; Andrew Dickson White, the founding President of Cornell University; John Fiske, a late 19th-century American philosopher; William James; David Starr Jordan, President and later Chancellor of Stanford University; and John Dewey.

== Reviews with some excerpts ==
There has been significant commentary on this book.

- Review: Bentley Glass, The Quarterly Review of Biology Vol. 29, No. 3 (Sep., 1954), pp. 249–250

Excerpt: The author has a decided gift for analysis, and the thoughts of the various protagonists are set forth clearly in relation to one another and to the advancing acceptance of the theory of organic evolution. The discussion of Fiske and James is particularly able; and the chapter on David Starr Jordan renders him full justice. On the other hand, the chapter on Dewey is unsympathetic. Perhaps the author is right in regarding Dewey as the outstanding cause of the modern cleavage between science and religion... Yet one may be pardoned for suspecting that, had there never been a John Dewey, the clash of Fundamentalism and Modernism would have held much the same course.... Much paper may be saved by taking the pains to look back at yesterday, to perceive how John William Draper, Andrew Dickson White, John Fiske, William James, David Starr Jordan, John Dewey, and undoubtedly numerous others, grappled with these problems, before one undertakes to advance a modern solution of them. In philosophy and religion, as in science itself, man can build the new only by understanding the old."

- Review: Birr, Kendall, The American Historical Review v. 58 (Apr. 1953) p. 635.

Excerpt: In many respects this is a valuable book. It does much to destroy the illusion that leading scientists were openly hostile to all aspects of Christianity or were unconcerned about the relations between science and religion. There is a particularly clear summary and criticism of Dewey's views, while the brief but incisive pages on the evolutionary controversy of the 1920s suggest the need for further research and reinterpretation of that subject. Finally, the author's avowedly Christian point of view produces some useful and interesting insights and criticisms. Nevertheless, the book has some serious limitations. It is concerned with only six major individuals who look with sympathy on a naturalistic point of view."

- Review: Henry F. May, The Mississippi Valley Historical Review, Vol. 39, No. 4 (Mar., 1953), pp. 803–805

Excerpt: "This little book is a significant contribution to a major enterprise--the revival of a specifically Christian interpretation of history. Since most of us are trained in a historical tradition dominated by liberalism and progress, it comes as a healthy shock to read an account of the conflict of science and religion written frankly from the standpoint of the latter, and presenting the victories of the former not as milestones of progress but as steps into a blind alley."

== See also ==
- Issues in Science and Religion
