= Freedom and Culture =

Book by John Dewey

- Title page for Freedom and Culture (1939)
- Author: John Dewey
- Language: English
- Genre: Non-fiction
- Publication date: 1939

Freedom and Culture is a book by John Dewey. Published in 1939, the book is an analytical defense of democracy written in a time when democratic regimes had recently been replaced by non-democratic ones, and at a time when Marxism was considered a powerful political force.

== Chapters ==
=== The problem of freedom ===
According to Dewey, human nature is the result of many forces, many of which are culturally determined. Attempts have been made to explain human behavior as being primarily motivated by love of freedom, or by pursuit of self-interest, or by the pursuit of power, or being primarily determined by economic conditions. All of these are products of their times and their inevitable falsification results in a backlash, de-emphasizing the formerly over-emphasized factor.

=== Culture and human nature ===
According to Dewey, freedom had been associated with individuality by some people and with rationality, or law, by others. It has also been associated with the farming class by some people and with capitalists by others. Individualism (or liberty) and social control (or law) have been proposed as two extremes between which freedom has to navigate. In reality, the individual and the social forces interact in various ways, rather than being two distinct extremes.

Therefore, for individuals to be free, appropriate social conditions must exist. Democratic conditions do not automatically maintain themselves and they cannot be mechanically prescribed in a constitution. Dictatorships exist not only through coercion but also by appealing to certain idealistic elements in people, such as solidarity or the appeal of sharing in the creation of a new system.

Public education and press free from government control can be as much a tool for totalitarianism as they are a tool for democracy. They surround the citizens, who in a modern state do not have direct contact with the events that affect them, with "ready made intellectual goods", making them susceptible to propaganda.

=== The American Background ===
According to Dewey, the leaders of the American rebellion against the British were motivated by restrictions placed on industry and trade and by high taxation. This was rationalized into the idea that all government not self-imposed is foreign to human nature and human rights. This simple theory of democracy was a product of the simple conditions under which it was formulated: There is a widespread desire in human nature for personal freedom - release from dominion over personal beliefs and conduct. The main threat to freedom is the tendency of government officials to extend their power. Therefore, guarantees against abuse of government power are enough to guarantee freedom. This idea is very influential in the U.S.

A view that economic development is having an anti-democratic effect and should be controlled by government is more modern and its existence is an indication that conditions have changed dramatically. Conditions have become more complex, and impersonal forces have been set in motion on unprecedented scale, resulting in loss of personal control over the personal situation. Modern conditions have rendered the assumed harmony between liberty and equality invalid. Also, the tendency toward organization by both labor and capital, that is inherent in economic development, was seen in the original democratic theory as an anti-democratic force.

The loss of control motivates both the working class and the capitalists to embrace totalitarian means in the hope of improving security, and distrust of organized labor and capital pushes the public to give more power, as a counterbalance, to a would-be dictator. Can existing institutions be used to cope with modern problems? Socialists who favor non-revolutionary means suggest regulation of industry or ownership of industry by government. Theory and practice, however, do not show that the resulting situation is essentially different from that of capitalism, leaving the question of how to reconcile modern conditions with democracy open.

=== Totalitarian Economics and Democracy ===
This chapter is a critique of monistic Marxist theory in vogue at the time the book was written. Marxism asserts that social activities and relations are determined solely by economic conditions, rejecting other factors, associated with human behavior, as having any influence. Original Marxist qualification to this position, allowing that existing social structures can have influence on subsequent events, is removed.

Beyond economic determinism, Marxism states that all social change is the result of class warfare, which moves the workers toward liberation from past subjugation, and finally creates a classless society. This law is an economic paraphrase of the Hegelian dialectic idealism, in which conflict between ideas results in synthesis and harmony.

Marxist theory was a creature of its time, a time when intellectual thought was dealing with social development (or "evolution"), causal necessity, Hegelian philosophy, economically based ideologies and the search for social theories. Marxism is dated by its search for unifying causality, since while the idea of unifying causality was typical of mid 19th century science, it was abandoned in later scientific thought, to be replaced by the idea of invariance, which describes how different phenomena relate to each other, rather than ascribe a single cause for all phenomena.

"The inherent theoretical weakness of Marxism is that it supposed a generalization that was made at a particular date and place (and made even then only by bringing observed facts under a premise drawn from a metaphysical source) can obviate the need for continued resort to observation, and to continual revision of generalizations in their office of working hypotheses."

Acceptance of Marxism was supported by its discussion of contemporary social phenomena - the struggle between capitalists and factory workers, and economic cycles and concentration. In both its structure and in its attraction based on addressing pressing social issues, Marxism is similar to a religious ideology.

In the USSR, monistic Marxist theory has been accompanied by the anti-scientific devices of one party control of all communications and persecution of dissenters. Power has been given to a small group to apply the theory in specific cases, giving that group absolute coercive power derived from the absolute principle.

This occurrence demonstrates that popular representation, multiple parties and constant criticism of government encourage freedom. Despite the influence of economic factors in politics, these formal devices allow interplay of various tendencies whose result is greatly better than that of a monistic idea.

=== Democracy and Human Nature ===
"We cannot continue the idea that human nature when left to itself, when freed from external arbitrary restrictions, will tend to the production of democratic institutions that work successfully... We have to see that democracy means the belief that humanistic culture should prevail; we should be frank and open in our recognition that the proposition is a moral one- like any idea that concerns what should be."

=== Science and Free Culture ===
"Science through its physical and technological consequences is now determining the relations between human beings. If it is incapable of developing moral techniques which will also determine these relations, the split in modern culture goes so deep that not only democracy but all civilized values are doomed. A culture that permits science to destroy traditional values but which distrusts its power to create new ones is a culture which is destroying itself."
