= Happy (nickname) =

As a nickname, Happy may refer to:

== In arts and entertainment ==
- Happy Caldwell (1903–1978), American jazz clarinetist and tenor saxophonist
- Howard Goodman, gospel musician, founder of the Happy Goodman Family
- Happy Hammond (1917–c. 1998), Australian comedian and children's show host
- Helen Reichert (1901–2011), American talk show personality and university professor
- Happy Rhodes (born 1965), American singer, songwriter and musician
- Happy Traum (1938–2024), American folk musician
- David "Happy" Williams (born 1946), US-based Trinidadian jazz double-bassist

== In politics ==
- John Newbold Camp (1908–1987), American politician
- Happy Chandler (1898–1991), American senator and Governor of Kentucky and Commissioner of Major League Baseball
- Happy Rockefeller (1926–2015), philanthropist, diplomat, and former second lady of the United States

== In sports ==
- Jack Chesbro (1874–1931), American Major League Baseball pitcher nicknamed "Happy Jack"
- Happy Feller (born 1949), American former National Football League kicker
- Happy Felsch (1891–1964), American Major League Baseball player
- Happy Finneran (1890–1942), American Major League Baseball player
- Happy Foreman (1899–1953), American Major League Baseball relief pitcher
- Happy Hairston (1942–2001), American National Basketball Association player
- Pat Hartnett (baseball) (1863–1935), American Major League Baseball player for part of one season
- Kevin Harvick (born 1975), American NASCAR driver nicknamed "Happy Harvick"
- Burt Hooton (born 1950), American former Major League Baseball pitcher and coach
- Happy Jele (born 1987), South African association football defender
- Archie McKain (1911–1985), American Major League Baseball pitcher
- Jeff Shulman (born 1975), American poker player and magazine editor
- Jack Stivetts (1868–1930), American Major League Baseball pitcher nicknamed "Happy Jack"
- George Wilson (1940s rugby player), Scottish rugby union and rugby league footballer who played in the 1940s and 1950s

== See also ==
- Happy (disambiguation)
- Amadeus IX, Duke of Savoy (1435–1472), nicknamed "the Happy"
- Hap (nickname)
