= Pennsylvania Health Care Quality Alliance =

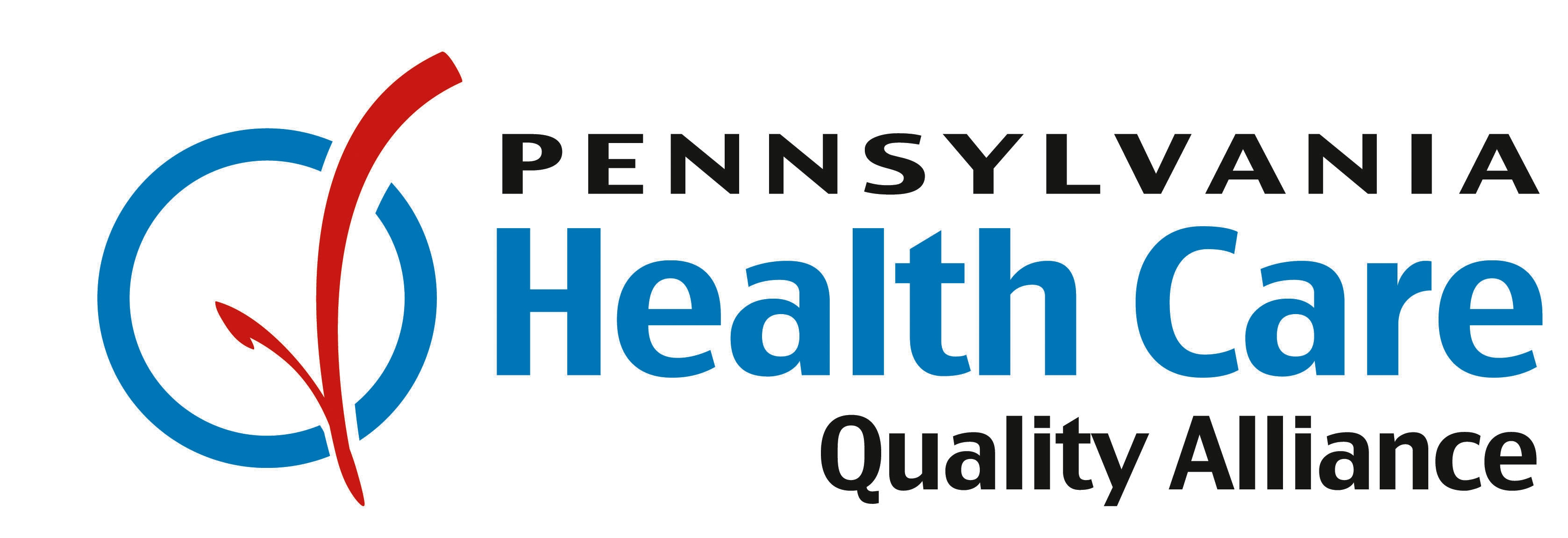
- Company type: Private not-for-profit
- Industry: Health care quality
- Headquarters: Philadelphia, Pennsylvania, United States
- Key people: Erik Muther, executive director Frank Trembulak, chairman
- Website: www.phcqa.org

The Pennsylvania Health Care Quality Alliance (PHCQA) is a nonprofit group of healthcare organizations, including the Hospital and Healthsystem Association of Pennsylvania, which represents more than 225 hospitals and health systems across Pennsylvania in the United States.

== Company history ==
Founded in January 2007, PHCQA originally began as an unincorporated association focused on developing alignment and agreement between payers and providers on hospital quality measures for accountability and performance assessment.

The first PHCQA Progress and Performance Report on hospital quality was published in March 2008 and in October 2008 became one of only three states in the U.S. to make "all-or-none" composite scores of hospital performance (so-called Appropriate Care Scores) available on a public website. In December 2008, PHCQA formally incorporated as a Pennsylvania nonprofit organization.

In 2009 and 2010, PHCQA continued to work on enhancing and updating measures as additional consensus-based definitions of health care quality measures and standards were developed. PHCQA also supported various statewide quality improvement efforts via its online infrastructure (data portal and performance reporting).

In 2011, PHCQA positioned itself to begin reporting ambulatory care measures and expand its membership base. It also continued to support hospitals as they prepared for value-based purchasing and new CMS reporting requirements. In December PHCQA started to provide measurement and reporting assistance to the Hospital and Healthsystem of Pennsylvania's "Hospital Engagement Network", a federally funded hospital quality program to reduce hospital-acquired conditions and 30-day readmissions. PHCQA supported this program for three years from 2011 to 2014.

In 2013, PHCQA was the first in the nation to publicly report cancer care quality measures from the National Cancer Database run by the Commission on Cancer (a national accreditation program run by the American College of Surgeons). While the reporting program started with process measures only, the goal was to begin reporting outcome measures as soon as an appropriate risk-adjustment methodology was developed.

On January 1, 2015, PHCQA merged with the Health Care Improvement Foundation (www.hcifonline.org), a regional quality improvement organization based in southeastern Pennsylvania.

== Social mission ==
The mission of the Pennsylvania Health Care Quality Alliance (PHCQA) is to improve the quality of patient health by encouraging the use of measures that will help providers to evaluate and improve the quality of their patient care, enable consumers to access and compare provider performance, and help insurers evaluate the performance of their provider networks.

The PHCQA website provides free, detailed reports of hospital performance based on widely recognized and established quality measures designed to be accessible to everyone. Users can find data on up to 39 different health care quality and experience measures, as reported by general acute care hospitals throughout Pennsylvania, and determine how hospitals compare with another and against state and national averages.

== Supporters ==
Supporting organizations from 2008 to 2014 included:

- Hospital and Healthsystem Association of Pennsylvania (HAP)
- Delaware Valley Healthcare Council of HAP
- Hospital Council of Western Pennsylvania
- Blue Cross of Northeastern Pennsylvania
- Capital Blue Cross
- Highmark
- Independence Blue Cross
- Geisinger Health Plan
- UPMC Health Plan
- Pennsylvania Medical Society
- Pfizer
- Pennsylvania Organization of Nurse Leaders
- Pennsylvania Department of Health
