= Henry Augustus Pearson Torrey =

American philosopher

Henry Augustus Pearson Torrey (1837–1902), also known as "HAP" or "Happy" Torrey, was an American professor of philosophy at the University of Vermont.

== Biography ==
Torrey was a great-grandson of Manasseh Cutler who had been a member of the United States Congress. His father, Augustus Torrey, was a medical doctor. Torrey was born in Beverly, Massachusetts. He moved to the household of his uncle Joseph Torrey to go to Burlington High School. He then studied at the University of Vermont, completing his bachelor's degree in 1858. After teaching school for a time in Beverly, Massachusetts, he went to the Union Theological Seminary in the City of New York from which he graduated in 1864. He was an ordained Congregational minister in Vergennes, Vermont until he was appointed to the faculty of the University of Vermont in 1868, taking on the Chair that had previously belonged to his uncle. He also served as secretary of the University starting in 1871, the year the university began to admit women.

A "sound philosopher", Torrey was an Intuitionist, as well as possessing a strong interest in Immanuel Kant, having "cut his philosophical teeth" on the Critique of Pure Reason. Nevertheless, Torrey did not follow any single philosophical system, and as a result he encouraged his students towards inquiry over the following of a particular approach.

Torrey taught John Dewey both when Dewey was a student at the University of Vermont and later in one-on-one sessions, in particular when Dewey returned to Vermont in the early 1880s to teach in a private academy. This period of private tuition was a considerable influence on Dewey, as it was this period when Torrey pointed Dewey towards a career in philosophy. Torrey's interest in Kant and the emphasis he placed on Kant's writings in his teaching influenced Dewey's early work, as evidenced in Dewey's first four publications.

In 1865 he married Sarah Paine Torrey, a daughter of his uncle Joseph Torrey, and thus his first cousin.
