= Haps (disambiguation) =

Haps is a village in the Dutch province of North Brabant.

Haps or HAPS may also refer to:

- Haps Magazine
- High-altitude platform station, also known as high-altitude pseudo-satellite
- Histories and Addresses of Philosophical Societies
- Hydrazine Auxiliary Propulsion System, a rocket upper stage developed by Orbital Sciences Corporation
- haps, social gatherings of youth in Laestadianism
- Institut libre Marie Haps, a college of higher education based in Brussels, Belgium
- Marie Haps Faculty of Translation and Interpreting, a faculty of Saint-Louis University, Brussels

== People with the name ==
- Haps Benfer (c. 1893-1966), American football and basketball player and college coach and administrator
- Marie Haps (1879-1939), Luxembourg-born Belgian educationalist
- Ridgeciano Haps (born 1993), Dutch footballer

== See also ==
- HAP (disambiguation)
