= Center for Dewey Studies =

The Center for John Dewey Studies at Southern Illinois University Carbondale (SIUC) was established as the central home for the works and study of philosopher/educator John Dewey. Led by Larry Hickman, it self-describes as "the home of ongoing publishing projects and research materials that focus on the life and work of the American philosopher and educator John Dewey", and with its publications and research the Center "has become the international focal point for research on Dewey's life and work."

== Founding and purpose ==
The center was founded in 1961 by Lewis E. Hahn initiating as the "Co-operative Research on Dewey Publications." "SIUC has a center dedicated to the study of his life and works because former University President Delyte Morris acquired the majority of Dewey materials for the University, beating out such other hopefuls as Columbia University." "From the outset the "Dewey Project," as it was called until 1971, was unique in the history of American letters: the first full-scale collected edition of the writing of an American philosopher; the only philosophical edition fully supported for more than a decade by a public university; and the first, and for a number of years the only, edition of philosophical writings ever edited according to the rigorous standards of the Modern Language Association's Center for Editions of American Authors.

37 volumes of the philosopher's complete works were completed by the center in the early 1990s.

== Publications ==
=== The Collected Works of John Dewey ===
"In 1990 the Center's editorial team, under the direction of Dr. Jo Ann Boydston, completed the monumental thirty-seven-volume critical edition of Dewey's writings. The Collected Works of John Dewey was published by Southern Illinois University Press in three series: The Early Works, 1882-1989 (five volumes); The Middle Works, 1899-1924 (fifteen volumes); and The Later Works, 1925-1953 (seventeen volumes). A cumulative short-title and subject index to The Collected Works was published in 1991. In 1996 the Center completed an electronic edition of The Collected Works, available on CD-ROM from the InteLex Corporation. Featuring superior Boolean and hypertext search tools, the electronic edition offers unprecedented access to Dewey's work. In order to facilitate standard citation, line and page breaks of the print edition have been maintained.

=== The Correspondence of John Dewey ===
By 1990 Dewey's writings had become available in a critically acclaimed print edition; his correspondence, however, was still widely dispersed and difficult or impossible to access. Researchers had first to determine the location of the materials and then request copies from scores of separate repositories. Some researchers found Dewey's handwriting difficult to read. Even when content could be discerned, researchers still needed to seek advice regarding the best way to quote the material. With generous support from the National Endowment for the Humanities, the John Dewey Foundation, Southern Illinois University Carbondale, and private donors, the Center has published a comprehensive electronic edition of the Dewey correspondence. Volume 1 (1871-1918) was published in a CD-ROM edition in 1999. In January 2000 it was selected by the editors of Choice as one of only nineteen publications in the field of philosophy to receive an "Outstanding Academic Title of 1999" award. Volume 2 (1919–1939) was published in 2001 and Volume 3 (1940–1952) was published in 2005. The Correspondence of John Dewey is available from the InteLex Corporation."

== Resources ==
The Center for Dewey Studies also houses a wide variety of rich aesthetic resources on and related to the life of John Dewey and his philosophy of art.

== Media ==
The Center and its Director have been featured in the recent film, John Dewey: His Life and Work (2001).

Center for Dewey Studies
Southern Illinois University Carbondale
807 South Oakland Avenue, MC:6822
Carbondale, Illinois

== See also ==
- John Dewey
- Democratic education
- Democratic schools
- John Dewey Society
- List of American philosophers
