= Histories and Addresses of Philosophical Societies =

Histories and Addresses of Philosophical Societies (HAPS) is a series published by Rodopi Publishers and edited by Richard T. Hull, State University of New York at Buffalo as part of the Value Inquiry Book Series. HAPS publishes the major addresses of philosophical societies along with any intellectual and biographical context that contributes to the material. HAPS is co-sponsored by the Conference of Philosophical Societies.
