= Walter C. Michels =

Professor of Physics

Walter C. Michels (1906–1975) was a Professor of Physics at Bryn Mawr College. He was chairman of the department of physics at Bryn Mawr from 1936 to 1970. He was named emeritus professor in 1972.

== Early life and education ==
Michels grew up in Utica, New York. Michels earned a degree in electrical engineering from Rensselaer Polytechnic Institute in 1927 and a Ph.D. from the California Institute of Technology.

== Career ==
He was a fellow of the National Research Council from 1930 to 1932 at Princeton University. In 1932 he left Princeton for Bryn Mawr College. He became chairman of the department of physics in 1936 and held that position until 1970. During World War II, Michels directed the Mine Warfare Operational Research group. In 1972 he was made emeritus professor of physics. In 1960 he became the chairman of the Commission on College Physics until 1964. He was also a president of the American Association of Physics Teachers from 1956 to 1957.

== Honors ==
In 1964 Michels won the Oersted Medal of the AAPT.

== Author ==
Michels was an editor of the American Journal of Physics from 1959 to 1966 and also the International Dictionary of Physics and Electronics. He is an author and co-author of several physics books, and a contributor to research on psychophysics.

== Death ==
He died of a heart attack on 27 February 1975.
