= Harrison Farber =

American scientist and professor

Harrison "Hap" Farber is Professor of Medicine and Director of the Pulmonary Hypertension Center at Boston University.

He attended undergraduate at Duke University before moving to Belgium and became a member of the Belgium cycling team. He then went on to attend medical school at George Washington University and entered into residency at the Medical College of Virginia. He completed a fellowship in pulmonary and critical care medicine at Boston University and Boston City Hospital Program. Dr. Farber completed an additional research year at Beth Israel Deaconess Hospital in basic science. Dr. Farber was a Professor in the Department of Medicine and attended in the Medical Intensive Care Unit and on the Pulmonary Consultation Service at Boston Medical Center. He also oversaw the care of all patients with Pulmonary Hypertension at Boston Medical Center. He is currently the director of the pulmonary embolism emergency response team (PERT) at Tufts New England Medical Center.

Dr. Farber's research focuses on the response of the pulmonary vasculature (the disposition or arrangement of blood vessels in an organ or part) to injury and endothelial cell biology. He has extensive government and private funding. He is a member of several research groups both within the Pulmonary Center and in other divisions within the Department of Medicine: the Pulmonary Vascular Biology Group (Pulmonary Center); the Center for Excellence in Sickle Cell Disease (Hematology), the Scleroderma Vascular Disease Group (Rheumatology) and Pulmonary Vascular/Left Ventricular Study Group (Cardiology). Dr. Farber's laboratory is investigating the response of the pulmonary vasculature in different etiologies of pulmonary hypertension using genomic and proteomic approaches to identify unique molecules as potential targets for new therapies for pulmonary hypertension associated.

== Selected publications ==
- Fisher KA, Serlin DM, Wilson KC, Walter RE, Berman, JS, Farber HW. Sarcoidosis associated pulmonary hypertension: Outcome with long-term epoprostenol treatment (submitted).
- Klings ES, Odhiambo, A, Li, G, Adewoye AH, Ieong, MH, Leopold JA, Steinberg MH, Farber HW. Reactive oxygen species-dependent induction of VCAM-1 expression in cultured pulmonary artery endothelial cells: Effects of sickle cell plasma (submitted)
- Wilson KW, Reardon C, Theodore AC, Farber HW. Propylene glycol toxicity: A severe iatrogenic illness in intensive care unit patients receiving intravenous benzodiazepines. Chest 2005; 128: 1674–1681.
- Farber HW, Loscalzo J. Pulmonary Hypertension (Mechanisms of Disease). N Engl J Med 2004; 351:1655-1665
