= John Dewey Society =

The John Dewey Society was founded in 1935, and was the first organization focused on philosophy of education. Its goal is to "keep alive John Dewey's commitment to the use of critical and reflective intelligence in the search for solutions to crucial problems in education and culture." The Society conducts a variety of activities, produces a peer-reviewed journal, and hosts the annual John Dewey Lecture at the American Educational Research Association conference, and offers the John Dewey Memorial Lecture at the annual Association for Supervision and Curriculum Development conference.

== Works about the JDS ==
- Axtelle, G.E. (2007) "H. Gordon Hullfish and the John Dewey Society," Educational Theory. 13;3, pp 220 – 221.
- Harap, H. (1970) "The Beginnings of the John Dewey Society," Educational Theory. 20;2, pp 157–63.

== See also ==
- Center for Dewey Studies
- Democratic education
- Democratic school
- Progressive education
