= Hospital and Healthsystem Association of Pennsylvania =

The Hospital and Healthsystem Association of Pennsylvania (HAP) is a statewide membership services organization in Harrisburg, Pennsylvania, that advocates for over 230 Pennsylvania acute and specialty care, primary care, subacute care, long-term care, home health, and hospice providers, as well as the patients and communities they serve. HAP is part of the Pennsylvania Health Care Quality Alliance.

== Leadership ==
In June 2023 Nicole Stallings was named CEO of HAP, succeeding Andy Carter.
