= Joseph Torrey (academic) =

American professor (1797–1867)

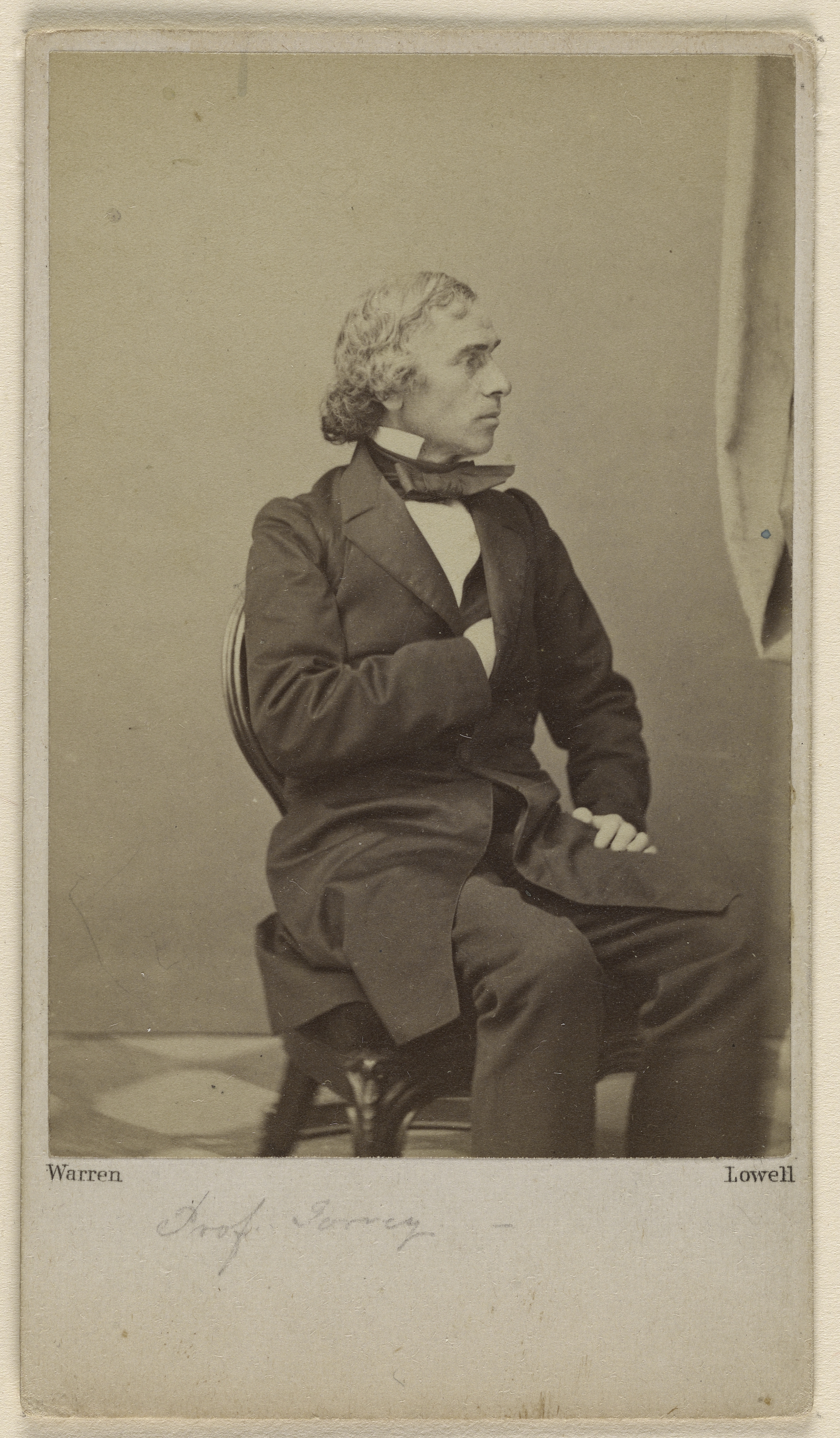

President of the University of Vermont
- In office 1862–1866

Personal details
- Born: February 2, 1797 Rowley, Massachusetts
- Died: November 26, 1867 (aged 70) Burlington, Vermont
- Spouse: Mary Mosley Paine
- Children: 5
- Education: Dartmouth College; Andover Theological Seminary
- Occupation: Philosopher, educator

Joseph Torrey (1797–1867) was an American professor of philosophy at the University of Vermont and acting president of that university for five years.

== Biography ==
Torrey was born in Rowley, Massachusetts on February 2, 1797. He received his education at Dartmouth College and Andover Seminary; later in his life he was honored by Harvard University with a Doctor of Divinity degree. Torrey joined the faculty of the University of Vermont in 1827, and remained there for the rest of his life, serving as its acting president from 1862 until his death.

Torrey and his wife, Mary Mosley Paine, were the parents of five children.

He died in Burlington, Vermont on November 26, 1867.

== Sources ==
- Carlton, Hiram. Genealogical and family history of the state of Vermont: a record of the achievements of her people in the making of a commonwealth and the founding of a nation. (New York: Lewis Publishing Company, 1903) p. 238.
- American philosophy.net Article on the work of James Marsh
