= Alice Chipman Dewey =

American educator and feminist (1858–1927)

- Born: September 7, 1858; Fenton, Michigan, U.S.
- Died: July 14, 1927 (aged 68); New York City, U.S.
- Occupation: Educator
- Spouse: John Dewey
- Children: 6

Alice Chipman Dewey (September 7, 1858 – July 14, 1927) was an American education reformer, philosopher, and feminist. She was instrumental in the development of progressive educational practices alongside her husband, philosopher John Dewey. Chipman played a significant role at the University of Chicago Laboratory School and was involved in various social and educational movements.

== Biography ==
=== Early life and education ===
Alice Chipman was born in Fenton, Michigan to Gordon Orlen Chipman, a cabinetmaker, and Lucy Riggs. After her parents died at a young age, Alice and her younger sister were raised by their maternal grandparents, Fred and Evalina Riggs, who encouraged social responsibility and self-reliance. Alice completed her high school education in Fenton and briefly attended the Fenton Baptist Seminary, where she studied music, before teaching school in Flushing, Michigan. In 1882, she enrolled in the University of Michigan, inspired by a desire for further education and an interest in women's rights.

=== Relationship with John Dewey ===
While a student at the University of Michigan, Chipman met John Dewey, a philosophy instructor who had recently joined the faculty. They developed a close friendship, with Chipman taking several of Dewey's advanced philosophy courses. By 1885, their relationship had deepened, and they married in the summer of 1886, after Chipman's graduation and Dewey's promotion to assistant professor. The couple settled in Ann Arbor, where Dewey advanced in his academic career while Chipman managed their household and raised their three children. Together, they had a total of six children.

=== University of Chicago Laboratory School ===
In 1894, the Dewey family moved to Chicago when John Dewey was appointed to lead a new department at the University of Chicago that combined philosophy, psychology, and education. This transition provided Chipman with the opportunity to play a key role in establishing the University of Chicago Laboratory School. She was heavily involved in bringing her husband's educational theories into practice, overseeing various aspects of the school's operations.

By 1901, Chipman had become the principal of the Laboratory School and also directed its Department of English and Literature. In this role, she was responsible for curriculum development, teaching, and managing the daily functions of the school. However, Chipman's leadership style, which included the quick dismissal of teachers she deemed unsatisfactory, led to tensions with some colleagues. There were also concerns that the school had become too closely tied to the Dewey family.

These tensions came to a head in 1904 when the university decided to merge the Parker Chicago Institute with the Laboratory School. This merger provided an opportunity to address the criticisms of Chipman's leadership, and in March 1904, University President William Rainey Harper informed Chipman that she was expected to resign. Following this development, both Chipman and John Dewey resigned from their positions, with John Dewey leaving all his roles at the university.

=== Later life ===
After leaving Chicago, the Dewey family relocated to New York, where John Dewey joined the faculty of Columbia University. In their new home, Chipman continued her work in education and social causes, including actively participating in the women's suffrage movement.

The Deweys faced personal tragedies during this period, including the deaths of their sons Morris and Gordon. These losses had a significant impact on Chipman, with accounts describing her as increasingly "querulous, resentful, and bitter" in her later years, though her children disputed this portrayal.

Despite her declining health, Alice Chipman remained committed to her advocacy work, including a notable trip to Japan and China from 1919 to 1921, where she lectured on women's rights and education. She continued this work until her death in New York City on July 14, 1927.

== Sources ==
=== Books ===
- Wood, JoAnn (February 2000). "Putnam, Helen Cordelia". American National Biography. New York: Oxford University Press. doi:10.1093/anb/9780198606697.article.0900891. (subscription required)
