= List of The New York Times number-one books of 1943 =

This is a list of books that topped The New York Times best-seller list in 1943.

The date of publication for the weekly lists changed from Monday to Sunday on November 28, 1943.

== Fiction ==
The following list ranks the number-one best-selling fiction books.

Date	Book	Author
January 4	The Robe	Lloyd Douglas
January 11	The Robe	Lloyd Douglas
January 18	The Robe	Lloyd Douglas
January 25	The Robe	Lloyd Douglas
February 1	The Valley of Decision	Marcia Davenport
February 8	The Robe	Lloyd Douglas
February 15	The Valley of Decision	Marcia Davenport
February 22	The Valley of Decision	Marcia Davenport
March 1	The Valley of Decision	Marcia Davenport
March 8	The Robe	Lloyd Douglas
March 15	The Robe	Lloyd Douglas
March 22	The Robe	Lloyd Douglas
March 29	The Robe	Lloyd Douglas
April 5	The Robe	Lloyd Douglas
April 12	The Robe	Lloyd Douglas
April 19	The Robe	Lloyd Douglas
April 26	The Robe	Lloyd Douglas
May 3	The Robe	Lloyd Douglas
May 10	The Robe	Lloyd Douglas
May 17	The Robe	Lloyd Douglas
May 24	The Robe	Lloyd Douglas
May 31	The Robe	Lloyd Douglas
June 7	The Robe	Lloyd Douglas
June 14	The Robe	Lloyd Douglas
June 21	The Robe	Lloyd Douglas
June 28	The Robe	Lloyd Douglas
July 5	The Robe	Lloyd Douglas
July 12	The Robe	Lloyd Douglas
July 19	The Robe	Lloyd Douglas
July 26	The Robe	Lloyd Douglas
August 2	The Robe	Lloyd Douglas
August 9	The Robe	Lloyd Douglas
August 16	The Robe	Lloyd Douglas
August 23	The Robe	Lloyd Douglas
August 30	The Robe	Lloyd Douglas
September 6	So Little Time	John P. Marquand
September 13	So Little Time	John P. Marquand
September 20	A Tree Grows in Brooklyn	Betty Smith
September 27	A Tree Grows in Brooklyn	Betty Smith
October 4	So Little Time	John P. Marquand
October 11	A Tree Grows in Brooklyn	Betty Smith
October 18	So Little Time	John P. Marquand
October 25	A Tree Grows in Brooklyn	Betty Smith
November 1	A Tree Grows in Brooklyn	Betty Smith
November 8	A Tree Grows in Brooklyn	Betty Smith
November 15	A Tree Grows in Brooklyn	Betty Smith
November 22	A Tree Grows in Brooklyn	Betty Smith
November 28	A Tree Grows in Brooklyn	Betty Smith
December 5	A Tree Grows in Brooklyn	Betty Smith
December 12	A Tree Grows in Brooklyn	Betty Smith
December 19	A Tree Grows in Brooklyn	Betty Smith
December 26	A Tree Grows in Brooklyn	Betty Smith

== Nonfiction ==
The following list ranks the number-one best-selling nonfiction books.

Date	Book	Author
January 4	See Here, Private Hargrove	Marion Hargrove
January 11	Our Hearts Were Young and Gay	Cornelia Otis Skinner and Emily Kimbrough
January 18	Our Hearts Were Young and Gay	Cornelia Otis Skinner and Emily Kimbrough
January 25	Our Hearts Were Young and Gay	Cornelia Otis Skinner and Emily Kimbrough
February 1	Our Hearts Were Young and Gay	Cornelia Otis Skinner and Emily Kimbrough
February 8	Our Hearts Were Young and Gay	Cornelia Otis Skinner and Emily Kimbrough
February 15	Our Hearts Were Young and Gay	Cornelia Otis Skinner and Emily Kimbrough
February 22	Guadalcanal Diary	Richard Tregaskis
March 1	Guadalcanal Diary	Richard Tregaskis
March 8	Guadalcanal Diary	Richard Tregaskis
March 15	Guadalcanal Diary	Richard Tregaskis
March 22	Guadalcanal Diary	Richard Tregaskis
March 29	Guadalcanal Diary	Richard Tregaskis
April 5	Guadalcanal Diary	Richard Tregaskis
April 12	Between the Thunder and the Sun	Vincent Sheean
April 19	One World	Wendell Willkie
April 26	One World	Wendell Willkie
May 3	One World	Wendell Willkie
May 10	One World	Wendell Willkie
May 17	One World	Wendell Willkie
May 24	One World	Wendell Willkie
May 31	One World	Wendell Willkie
June 7	One World	Wendell Willkie
June 14	One World	Wendell Willkie
June 21	One World	Wendell Willkie
June 28	One World	Wendell Willkie
July 5	One World	Wendell Willkie
July 12	U.S. Foreign Policy	Walter Lippmann
July 19	U.S. Foreign Policy	Walter Lippmann
July 26	Journey Among Warriors	Ève Curie
August 2	Journey Among Warriors	Ève Curie
August 9	Under Cover	John Roy Carlson
August 16	Under Cover	John Roy Carlson
August 23	Under Cover	John Roy Carlson
August 30	Under Cover	John Roy Carlson
September 6	Under Cover	John Roy Carlson
September 13	Under Cover	John Roy Carlson
September 20	Under Cover	John Roy Carlson
September 27	Under Cover	John Roy Carlson
October 4	Under Cover	John Roy Carlson
October 11	Under Cover	John Roy Carlson
October 18	Under Cover	John Roy Carlson
October 25	Under Cover	John Roy Carlson
November 1	Under Cover	John Roy Carlson
November 8	Under Cover	John Roy Carlson
November 15	Under Cover	John Roy Carlson
November 22	Under Cover	John Roy Carlson
November 28	Under Cover	John Roy Carlson
December 5	Under Cover	John Roy Carlson
December 12	Under Cover	John Roy Carlson
December 19	Under Cover	John Roy Carlson
December 26	Under Cover	John Roy Carlson

== See also ==
- Publishers Weekly list of bestselling novels in the United States in the 1940s
