= Lippmann–Dewey Debate =

20th-century American political science debate

The Lippmann–Dewey Debate is a term applied in the late 20th century to a virtual debate between Walter Lippmann and John Dewey over the nature and viability of democracy and the role of the media in a world that was becoming more and more complicated.

Lippmann was worried that within democracies public opinion based on citizens' mental constructs, termed pseudo-environments was moulded by the media and a range of stereotypes, and that this made the public poor arbiters of good decision making. He argued that democracies would tend to be driven by emotional reactions rather than informed understanding. The media and lack of time and the constraints of language add to the complications.

Dewey's response to this was not to dismiss Lippmann's worries but to argue for a reframing of democracy. It should, in his view, be not just a political system but rather an interconnected organism through which the citizenry can participate in a democracy which is both a form of social cooperation and an ethical ideal.

Lippmann's worries led him to, in Dewey's view, retreat from democratic ideals and to justify the manufacturing of consent by managing public opinion by a technocratic elite. Dewey himself thought that democracy should be conceived as involving mutual growth, with each citizen making their own contribution and where the antidote to authoritarianism lies in cultivating thoughtful, empowered citizens, and in advancing and deepening democratic ideals, rather than retreating from them.

James W. Carey, a noted American communication theorist, was perhaps the person most responsible for framing these contributions as a debate, at the center of which was a fundamental disagreement over the roles of experts versus the public in democracies with respect to:

- nature of competence and knowledge required of for citizens to engage usefully in popularly governed political system,
- the ability of citizens to obtain and use knowledge in a politically competent way.

== See also ==
- Almond–Lippmann consensus, a political science statement on public opinion and foreign policy partially based on Lippmann's work

== Original sources ==
Dewey

- Dewey, J. (1922). “Public Opinion,” The New Republic 30 (May 3) 286–288.
- Dewey, J. (1925). “Practical Democracy,” The New Republic 45 (Dec. 2), 52–54.
- Dewey, J. (1927). The Public and Its Problems. New York:

Lippmann

- Lippmann, W. (1922). Public Opinion. New York: Harcourt, Brace.
- Lippmann, W. (1925). The Phantom Public. New York: Harcourt, Brace.

Carey

- Carey, James W. (1982) ‘‘Mass Media: The Critical View,’’ Communication Yearbook V, Beverly Hills, CA: Sage

== Other sources ==
- Schudson, M. (2008). The" Lippmann–Dewey Debate" and the Invention of Walter Lippmann as an Anti-Democrat 1985–1996. International Journal of communication, 2, 12.
- Marres, N. (2005). Issues spark a public into being: A key but often forgotten point of the Lippmann-Dewey debate. Making things public: Atmospheres of democracy, 208–217.
- Bybee, C. (1999). Can democracy survive in the post-factual age?: A return to the Lippmann-Dewey debate about the politics of news. Journalism & Communication Monographs, 1(1), 28–66.
- DeCesare, T. (2012). The Lippmann-Dewey “debate” revisited: The problem of knowledge and the role of experts in modern democratic theory. Philosophical Studies in Education, 43, 106–116.
- Jansen, S. C. (2009). Phantom conflict: Lippmann, Dewey, and the fate of the public in modern society. Communication and Critical/Cultural Studies, 6(3), 221–245.
- Crick, N. (2009). The search for a purveyor of news: The Dewey/Lippmann debate in an Internet age. Critical Studies in Media Communication, 26(5), 480–497.
