= A Test of the News =

1920 work by Walter Lippmann and Charles Merz

A Test of the News is a study of the objectivity and neutrality of press coverage, written by Walter Lippmann and Charles Merz, later editor of The New York Times. It was prepared with the assistance of Faye Albertson Lippmann, Lippmann's first wife.

The subject was the portrayal of the Russian Revolution. The study appeared on August 4, 1920, as a 42-page supplement to The New Republic. In a kind of content analysis, the authors examined several thousand newspaper articles in more than 1,000 issues published over a period of three years, beginning in March 1917 and ending in March 1920.

== Objectives ==
The occasion was the widespread doubt about media coverage, which was to be verified by an empirical study:

There is today a widespread and growing doubt whether there exists such an access to the news about contentious affairs. This doubt ranges from accusations of unconscious bias to downright charges of corruption, from the belief that the news is coloured to the belief that the news is poisoned. On so grave a matter evidence is needed. (p. 1)

The New York Times was chosen because it was the most influential newspaper, because it had the ability to investigate, because the technical editing of the news was admirable, the index facilitated systematic study, it was easily accessible and it was one of the greatest newspapers in the world. The Russian Revolution had been chosen as a subject, because it was so significant and aroused the passions that put the objectivity of the reports most to the test. The question to be answered was:

... whether the reader of the news was given a picture of various phases of the revolution which survived the test of events, or whether he was misled into believing that the outcome of events would be radically different from the actual outcome.

The study was devoted to seven periods of time and, in retrospect, to undisputed main events. For each time period, the main tendency of press coverage is worked out.

Sections 1 to 3 : Purposeful optimism

Section 4: Disappointment and propaganda for a military intervention

Section 5: Fear of the "Red Scare" as a further motive for intervention

Section 6: Generals of the "whites" are propagated as saviours

Section 7: The fear of the Germans is replaced by the fear of the "Reds"

== Conclusions ==
The study concluded that the Times' reporting was neither unbiased nor accurate. The newspaper's news stories were not based on facts, but "were determined by the hopes of the men who made up the news organisations." The newspaper referred to events that had not taken place, atrocities that did not exist, and reported no fewer than 91 times that the Bolshevik regime was on the verge of collapse.

Lippmann's biographer Ronald Steel sums it up: "The news about Russia is an example of what people wanted to see, not what happened," Lippmann and Merz noted critically. "The main censor and the main propagandist was the hope and fear in the minds of reporters and editors."

== Journalistic standards ==
Lippmann and Merz see the cause of the deficiencies in failing to meet journalistic standards. The analysis shows, according to the authors in the final chapter,

- how seriously misguided the Times was in relying on official sources of information. It is clear that an independent press cannot treat factual claims by governments and governmental circles, as well as by leaders of political movements, as factual judgements. This points to opinions that are guided by a particular purpose, that they are not reliable news. (...) Measured by high journalistic standards, a minister's statement on a matter of vital importance is a call for an independent investigation. It is even more misleading to rely on semi-official anonymous statements instead of official communications. Journalists should not have too close ties to politics. (see p. 41)
- Not even a newspaper like the Times could meet the need for suitable correspondents. In extraordinary times, one needs extraordinary correspondents. Reporting is one of the most difficult professions, requiring expert knowledge and serious training. (see p. 42)
- In critical times the separation of editorials and news breaks down. The Russian policy of the editors had influenced the news deeply and in a blatant way. The text design of the news in terms of emphasis and captions was clearly determined by standards other than professional ones. This fact is seen as so obvious by the authors, so striking the influence of the editors' bias, that "serious reform is needed until the code that was violated can be restored". (p. 42)

== Solutions ==
Lippmann and Merz do not see the solution in a legal regulation of the press, but rather in the orientation towards a professional ethos which is reinforced by readers not by writing letters to the editor, but rather by speaking "through organizations which will become centers of resistance." (see p. 42)

== Quotation ==
"In the large, the news about Russia is a case of seeing not what was, but what men wished to see. (...) The chief censor and the chief propagandist were hope and fear in the minds of reporters and editors. They wanted to win the war; they wanted to ward off bolshevism. (...) For subjective reasons they accepted and believed most of what they were told by the State Department, (...) reports of governmentally controlled news services abroad, and of correspondents who were unduly intimate with the various secret services and with members of the old Russian nobility. From the point of view of professional journalism the reporting of the Russian Revolution is nothing short of a disaster. On the essential questions the net effect was almost always misleading, and misleading news is worse than none at all. (...) They were performing the supreme duty in a democracy of supplying the information on which public opinion feeds, and they were derelict in that duty. Their motives may have been excellent. They wanted to win the war; they wanted to save the world. They were nervously excited by exciting events.They were baffled by the complexity of affairs, and the obstacles created by war. But whatever the excuses, the apologies, and the extenuation, the fact remains that a great people in a supreme crisis could not secure the minimum of necessary information on a supremely important event."
