= Creative Democracy =

1939 essay by American philosopher John Dewey

"Creative Democracy: The Task Before Us" is a 1939 essay by American philosopher John Dewey. Dewey's essay was originally delivered as a speech by philosopher Horace Kallen on October 20, 1939, at a dinner in honor of Dewey's 80th birthday that he was unable to attend. Dewey argues that democracy is a way of life and an experience built on faith in human nature, faith in human beings, and faith in working with others. Democracy, in Dewey's view, is a moral ideal requiring actual effort and work by people; it is not an institutional concept that exists outside of ourselves. "The task of democracy", Dewey concludes, "is forever that of creation of a freer and more humane experience in which all share and to which all contribute."

== Publication history ==
- Dewey, John. 1939. John Dewey and the Promise of America, Progressive Education Booklet No. 14. Columbus, Ohio: American Education Press.

== See also ==
- Associative democracy
- Deliberative democracy
- The Public and its Problems
