= Drift and Mastery =

Book by Walter Lippmann

Drift and Mastery: An Attempt to Diagnose the Current Unrest
- Author: Walter Lippmann
- Language: English
- Publisher: Mitchell Kennerley
- Publication date: 1914
- Publication place: United States
- Media type: Print (hardback & paperback)
- Pages: 177
- ISBN: 978-0299106041
- OCLC: 12837367

Drift and Mastery: An Attempt to Diagnose the Current Unrest is the second book by American journalist and political thinker Walter Lippmann. Published in the Fall of 1914, Drift and Mastery argues that rational scientific governing can overcome forces of societal drift. Lippmann argued that due to the profound social and economic change old ideas and institutions lacked relevance.

Specifically, Drift and Mastery warns against a reliance on broad theories and the framework of competition and self-interest. Democracy and society at large, he argued, was unable to address problems because it was adrift, lacking intentionality and discipline. Lippmann's prescription in Drift and Mastery was deliberate and scientific governing, what he termed mastery. This forward-looking progressive vision sought a better society through rational, scientific order, while rejecting Marxist, Utopian and traditionalist thinking.

Drift and Mastery received enormously positive reviews, establishing Lippmann as an important public intellectual and figure within the progressive movement. Although Lippmann later lost faith in the promise of science and rationality in government, Drift and Mastery was and is regarded as an important document of the progressive movement.

== Summary ==
=== Part One ===
The Themes of Muckraking

Lippmann examines the trend of muckraking journalism as emblematic of the underlying social conditions in America. Lippmann argues the increasing scope of government and integration of society led to the proliferation of muckraking. According to Lippmann, corruption had always existed in politics, but social change and the expansion of government made it relevant and scandalous. He argues muckraking is therefore neither "progressive or reactionary", but simply a manifestation of the bewilderment of society at evolving social and economic arrangements.

New Incentives

Lippmann argues against commercial competition as the best incentive for industry. Opposing systematic anti-trust policies, he believes well-managed trusts can increase cooperation while minimizing waste. Lippmann advocates scientific experimentation to find the most efficient mode of business. Increased power for labor and the consumer he argues will lead to a new system of incentives. Lippmann also notes the development of school of business administration may encourage a scientific ethic to replace businesses' reliance on competition.

The Magic of Property

Lippmann asserts that old definitions of property are outmoded by the advances of industrial capitalism, especially stock ownership in corporations. As a solution he proposes government ownership of some industry (steel, oil, coal, etc.) combined with the application of managerial skill. Lippmann further challenges the view that private ownership and especially stock ownership leads to efficiency. Citing the construction of the Panama Canal, he argues government can work efficiently when given the means.

Caveat Emptor

Lippmann addresses the concerns of consumers as part of the new economic order. He argues that because of lack of information and the misinformation of advertising current patterns of consumption were inefficient. Lippmann sees several ways of correcting this problem. According to Lippmann, centralization and conglomeration of business will create greater accountability to consumers by focusing their attention. Politically, Lippmann argues that voting rights for women, the primary household consumer, will increase the importance of the consumer in the political realm. Lippmann speculates that consumers are, "destined to be stronger than the interests either of labor or of capital."

A Key to the Labor Movement

Lippmann argues that labor unions form a necessary safeguard against tyrannical capitalism and bring democracy to industry. As Lippmann states, "Without unions industrial democracy is unthinkable. Without democracy in industry, that is where it counts most, there is no such thing as democracy in America." Lippmann goes on to criticize radical unions such as the IWW, arguing they do not value tangible gains for their members.

The Funds of Progress

Lippmann addresses the question of how increased social programs can be paid for. He argues there is a social surplus that can be created by increasing efficiency using management and science. Lippmann argues that business when forced to account for the interest of the worker, the consumer and the government will refrain from "reducing wages or raising prices" and will instead focus on industrial efficiency. Science and management, he argues, will allow business to find the "funds of progress" by reducing waste, increasing cooperation and simply being industrially efficient.

A Nation of "Villagers"

Lippmann begins by examining the hostility to trusts. He argues that much hostility can be attributed not to trusts unethical actions, but to their relative newness. In this vein Lippmann criticizes politicians who appeal to a sense of outrage in trusts and new economic arrangements. He specifically mentions both William Jennings Bryan and Woodrow Wilson, who he believes falsely idealize the small-scale agrarian past. Lippmann states this view quite succinctly at the end of the chapter writing,

Those who cling to the village view of life may deflect the drift, may batter the trusts around a bit, but they will never dominate business, never humanize its machinery, and they will continue to be playthings of industrial change. At the bottom the issue is between those who are willing to enter upon effort for which there is no precedent, and those who aren't.

=== Part Two ===
A Big World and Little Men

In this chapter Lippmann contrasts the complexity of societal problems with simplistic institutions. He argues just as a city dweller is unaccustomed to dealing with the countryside, our institutions are unable to deal with the "big" modern world. Lippmann therefore asserts institutions should, and in democracies already have, adapt themselves to these changed conditions. More personally, Lippmann claims this "big world" causes individual turmoil as, "Those changes distract him so deeply that the more 'advanced' he is, the more he flounders in the bogs of his own soul."

Drift

Lippmann begins by asserting that Wilson's New Freedom is flawed because it assumed an older form of democracy can be retrieved. This looking backwards for a golden age is fruitless and is essentially childish according to Lippmann. On similar grounds Lippmann goes on to criticize Marxian socialists who he sees as unrealistic in their assumptions. Lippmann ends by defining the challenge of "drift." He calls drift a "spiritual problem," which is caused by the combination of social/economic change and the freedom from the old order.

The Rock of Ages

In this chapter Lippmann criticizes the dogmatic clinging to tradition and further outlines the challenge of modern social and economic arrangements. Lippmann goes on to examine immigration and uses the metaphor of immigration to describe all people are immigrants in the rapidly changing modern world.

=== Part Three ===
A Note on the Women's Movement

Lippmann cites the women's movement as a perfect example of how the "rock of ages" has given way to a modern dilemma where freedom must be exercised rationally. Women's rights he argues, are necessary simply because society has already moved past demarcated "spheres." He emphasizes the movement towards women's rights and rationality in housework and child rearing will be especially dramatic because women have heretofore been irrational and conservative in their actions. Noticeably, Lippmann is not completely on board with a feminist agenda. He states plainly that female participation in the labor force is a societal ill that will hopefully come to an end.

Bogeys

Lippmann examines how, especially in an increasingly complex world, fear prevents society from addressing problems rationally. He argues that removing everyday concerns and fears will lead to greater rationality and boldness on the part of citizens. Invoking Freud, he argues that constructed fears unconsciously hold people and society back from achievement.

Poverty, Chastity, Obedience

Lippmann argues poverty, chastity and obedience are a more primitive and brutal means of controlling a society, compared with self-government. Notably, he argues that, "To create a minimum standard of life below which no human being can fall is the most elementary duty of the democratic state." Lippmann extends the implications of this argument asserting that those afflicted by poverty are "unfit for self-government."

Similarly, Lippmann advocates moving beyond valuing chastity. Instead he argues, "Our interest in sex is no longer to annihilate it, but to educate it, to find civilized opportunities for its expression." Summing up this line of argument, Lippmann asserts old virtues sought to restrain citizens whereas true democratic virtues should provide people with a rich life where they deal with life in all its complexity.

Mastery

Lippmann begins this chapter by citing the example of a primitive tribe who had traditionally chopped down trees with the ineffective method of straight cuts. When the more effective "western" method of using V-shaped cuts was introduced, Lippmann relates, the tribe insisted on the less effective method for the sake of tradition. Lippmann argues current society clinging to traditional methods and economic approach to are as irrational as tribesmen refusing to make V-shaped cuts. Lippmann goes on to define the scientific and rational application of new methods and approaches as mastery. Notably, he argues science is inextricably linked to democracy, that "The scientific spirit is the discipline of democracy."

Modern Communion

Lippmann begins examining the individual implications of his societal framework. He argues that science, unlike socialism, provides a means for collective cooperation for the betterment of society. Science, according to Lippmann, allows people worldwide to approach problems within the same framework and come to similar conclusions. Spelling out his pragmatic understanding Lippmann argues science, "distinguishes between fact and fancy, and works always with the implied resolution to make the best out of what is possible."

Fact and Fancy

In his final chapter, Lippmann fully takes on the impact of science. He notes that science may seem ill-suited to social concerns and generally impersonal. Lippmann differentiates the scientific viewpoint from a complete rejection of tradition. He argues that past, because of its variety of ways of life and societies, can be a source of inspiration. Instead of an "abrupt break with the accumulated wisdom of the past," Lippmann favors taking what is rational and useful from tradition. Lippmann concludes by affirming the power of science to encompass the full range of human experience and materially improve upon it. He argues that science is the means to make "reality bend to our purposes."

== Themes ==
=== Social Change ===
Lippmann grounds his argument in the supposition that the world had changed radically. Lippmann draws a steep distinction between the modern world, and the world in which traditions and institutions were created. He asserts the modern world is, "brain-splitting in its complexity," to the point where no individual or institution can understand it. Therefore, he argues, institutions and ideas must evolve to keep pace with these changes. This sentiment is perhaps best encapsulated by the noted quotation from Chapter 10 The Rock of Ages,

We are all of us immigrants in the industrial world, and we have no authority to lean upon. We are an uprooted people, newly arrived, and nouveau riche. As a nation we have all the vulgarity that goes with that, all the scattering of soul. The modern man is not yet settled in this world. It is big. The evidence is everywhere: the amusements of the city; the jokes that pass for jokes; the blare that stands for beauty, the folklore of Broadway, the feeble and apologetic pulpits, the cruel standards of success, raucous purity. We make love to ragtime and we die to it. We are blown hither and thither like litter before the wind. Our days are lumps of experience.

Lippmann therefore sees attempts to restore first principles or traditional values as both quixotic and counterproductive. Lippmann saw a new world in the twentieth century that required new means of control and improvement.

=== Science and Management ===
Lippmann relies heavily on the ability of the scientific method to reform and improve society. Drift and Mastery continually proposes science as both a means of improving society and an alternative to dogma and outmoded means to governing. Lippmann associates science with democracy, writing "It is self-government." Within the shared discipline of science Lippmann sees hope for a cosmopolitan society. Scientific innovations and ideas that hold a common language and legitimacy that appeal strongly to Lippmann.

Lippmann's reform prescriptions often involve improving management and efficiency of bureaucratic institutions. Specifically, he believes introducing the scientific method and a professional ethic to business holds tremendous promise. Looking to the beginnings of schools of business administration, Lippmann asserts planning and rational management holds the key to the promise of democracy and modern society.

=== Criticism of Private Property and Profit Motives ===
Lippmann opposes the universality and ideas of the sanctity of private property. Economically, he argues repeatedly against schemes of competition and free markets. Competitive capitalism to Lippmann is inefficient and wasteful, an outdated system in the modern world. Although he opposes Marxism, he frequently voices support of increased economic cooperation and central control. For Lippmann, the trend towards conglomeration and trusts is a rational and scientific step towards greater efficiency. Where private excess in trusts failed, he asserts that management and government control of "large-scale" industries can yield huge gains for society.

== Reaction ==
Upon its publishing, Drift and Mastery received enthusiastic reviews. The New York Times called it "a brilliant production, both in style and content." Leaders of the progressive movement hailed Drift and Mastery both for its content and literary style. Theodore Roosevelt, who had met and consulted with Lippmann during the writing, said that "No man who wishes seriously to study our present social, industrial and political life can afford not to read it through and through and ponder and digest it." Similarly effusive praise came from Oliver Wendell Holmes Jr. who said that the book was "devilishly well-written . . . altogether a delightful fresh piece of writing and thinking."

Outside the community of progressives and reformers, reactions to Drift and Mastery were more mixed. The religious community criticized Lippmann's rejection of traditional values and dismissal of contemporary religion. These religious commentators specifically criticized both Lippmann's implicit break with religious teachings and his self-assured tone. A small minority of reviewers criticized Lippmann for his reliance on the power of science, accusing him of a dogmatic adherence to experts over "the people." Common to these criticisms was a sense that Lippmann was premature in pronouncing the death of old institutions and ideas. Although Lippmann had captured the feeling of dynamism in the reform movement of his time, many arguably severely underestimated the durability of the old order.

== Publication history ==
- 1914: Mitchell Kennerley (New York, NY) Full text available.
- 1917: Henry Holt and Company (New York, NY) Full text available.
- 1961: Prentice-Hall, Inc. (Englewood, NJ) Full text available.
