= U.S. Foreign Policy (book) =

Book by Walter Lippmann

- First edition
- Author: Walter Lippmann
- Language: English
- Subject: Foreign policy of the United States
- Genre: non-fiction
- Publisher: Little, Brown and Company
- Publication date: 1943
- Publication place: United States
- Media type: Book
- Pages: 663–665

U.S. Foreign Policy: Shield of the Republic is a 1943 book by Walter Lippmann. It was published by Little, Brown and Company.
