= Walter Lippmann =

American journalist (1889–1974)

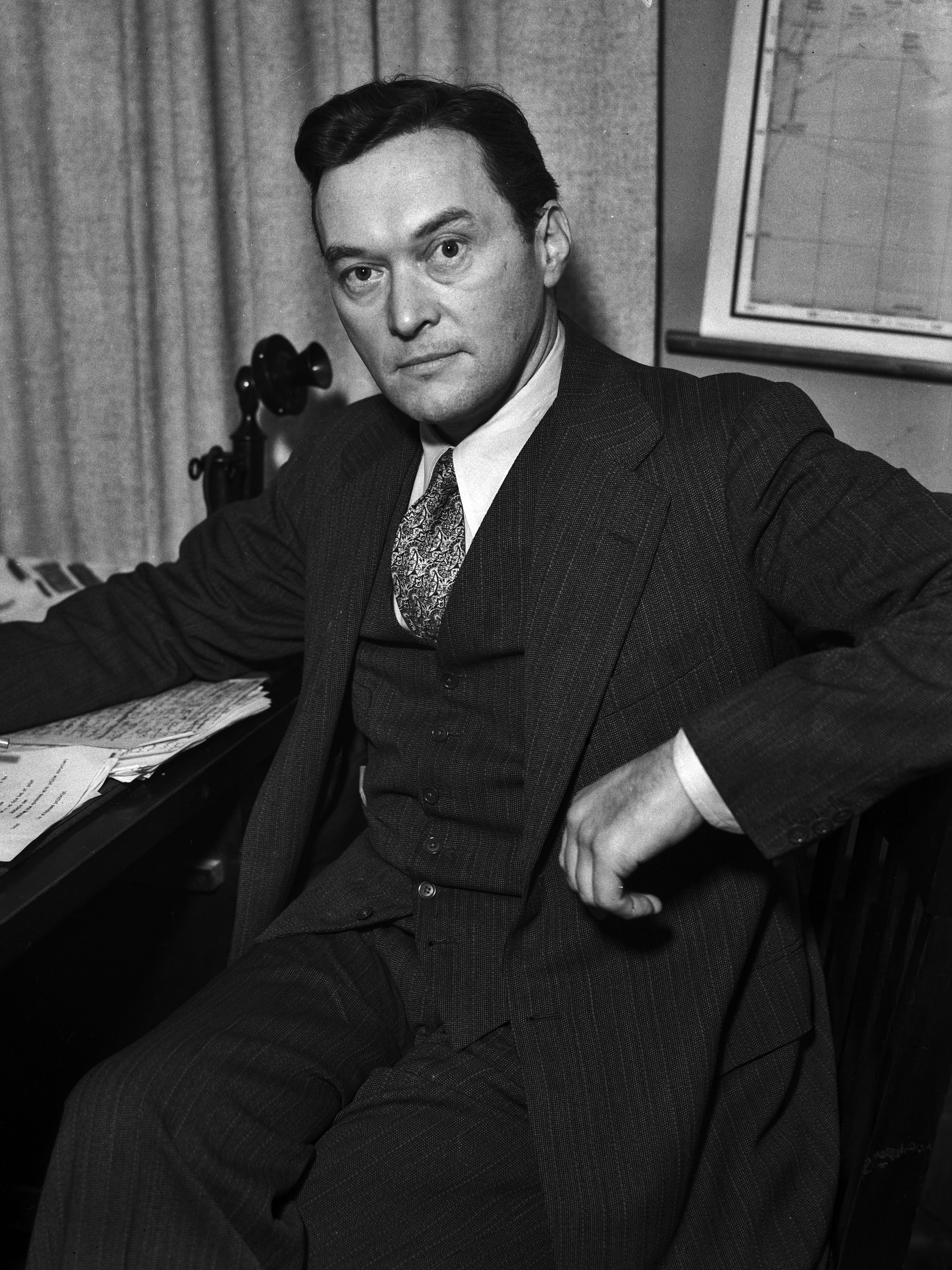
- Lippmann in 1936
- Born: September 23, 1889; New York City, U.S.
- Died: December 14, 1974 (aged 85); New York City, U.S.
- Education: Harvard University (AB)
- Occupation: Journalist
- Spouses: Faye Albertson (m. 1917; div. 1937) Helen Byrne (m. 1938)
- Writing career
- Years active: 1911–1971
- Notable works: Founding editor of New Republic, Public Opinion
- Notable awards: Pulitzer Prize (1958, 1962) Presidential Medal of Freedom (1964)

Walter Lippmann (September 23, 1889 – December 14, 1974) was an American journalist. With a career spanning 60 years, he is famous for being among the first to introduce the concept of the Cold War, coining the term "stereotype" in the modern psychological meaning, as well as critiquing media and democracy in his newspaper column and several books, most notably his 1922 Public Opinion.

Lippmann also played a notable role as research director of Woodrow Wilson's post–World War I board of inquiry. His views on the role of journalism in a democracy were contrasted with the contemporaneous writings of John Dewey in what has been retrospectively named the Lippmann–Dewey Debate. Lippmann won two Pulitzer Prizes, one for his syndicated newspaper column "Today and Tomorrow" and one for his 1961 interview of Nikita Khrushchev.

He has also been highly praised with titles ranging from "most influential" journalist of the 20th century to "Father of Modern Journalism". Michael Schudson writes that James W. Carey considered Walter Lippmann's book Public Opinion as "the founding book of modern journalism" and also "the founding book in American media studies".

== Early life and education ==
Lippmann was born on New York's Upper East Side as the only child of Jewish parents of German origin. According to his biographer Ronald Steel, he grew up in a "gilded Jewish ghetto". His father, Jacob Lippmann, was a rentier who had become wealthy through his father's textile business and his father-in-law's real estate speculation. His mother, Daisy Baum, cultivated contacts in the highest circles, and the family regularly spent its summer holidays in Europe. The family had a Reform Jewish orientation; averse to "orientalism", they attended Temple Emanu-El. Walter had his Reform Jewish confirmation instead of the traditional Bar Mitzvah at the age of 14. Lippmann was emotionally distanced from both parents, but had closer ties to his maternal grandmother. His family was Republican.

From 1896 Lippmann attended the Sachs School for Boys, followed by the Sachs Collegiate Institute, an elite and strictly secular private school in the German Gymnasium tradition, attended primarily by children of German-Jewish families and run by the classical philologist Julius Sachs, a son-in-law of Marcus Goldmann from the Goldman-Sachs family. Classes included 11 hours of ancient Greek and 5 hours of Latin per week.

Shortly before his 17th birthday, he entered Harvard University where he wrote for The Harvard Advocate and studied under George Santayana, William James, and Graham Wallas, concentrating upon philosophy and languages (he spoke German and French). While at Harvard, he tried out for The Harvard Crimson but was rejected. He took only one course in history and one in government. He was a member of the Phi Beta Kappa society, though important social clubs rejected Jews as members.

Lippmann became a member, alongside Sinclair Lewis, of the New York chapter of the Socialist Party of America. In 1911, Lippmann served as secretary to George R. Lunn, the first Socialist mayor of Schenectady, New York, during Lunn's first term. Lippmann resigned his post after four months, finding Lunn's programs to be worthwhile in and of themselves, but inadequate as socialism.

== Career ==
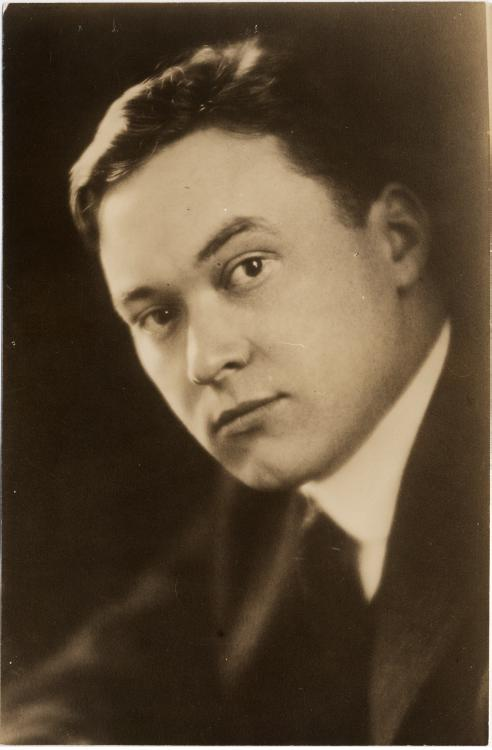
Lippmann in 1914, shortly after the establishment of The New Republic

Lippmann was a journalist, a media critic and an amateur philosopher who tried to reconcile the tensions between liberty and democracy in a complex and modern world, as in his 1920 book Liberty and the News. In 1914, Lippmann, Herbert Croly, and Walter Weyl became the founding editors of The New Republic.

During World War I, Lippmann was commissioned a captain in the Army on June 28, 1918, and was assigned to the intelligence section of the AEF headquarters in France. He was assigned to the staff of Edward M. House in October and attached to the American Commission to negotiate peace in December. He returned to the United States in February 1919 and was immediately discharged.

Through his connection to House, Lippmann became an adviser to Wilson and assisted in the drafting of Wilson's Fourteen Points speech. He sharply criticized George Creel, whom the President appointed to head wartime propaganda efforts at the Committee on Public Information. While he was prepared to curb his liberal instincts because of the war, saying he had "no doctrinaire belief in free speech," he nonetheless advised Wilson that censorship should "never be entrusted to anyone who is not himself tolerant, nor to anyone who is unacquainted with the long record of folly which is the history of suppression."

Lippmann examined the coverage of newspapers and saw many inaccuracies and other problems. He and Charles Merz, in a 1920 study entitled A Test of the News, stated that The New York Times' coverage of the Bolshevik Revolution was biased and inaccurate. In addition to his newspaper column "Today and Tomorrow", he wrote several books.

Lippmann was the first to bring the phrase "Cold War" to a common currency, in his 1947 book by the same name. He may also have coined the metaphor about newspaper reporters, " ...‘the fly on the wall,’ seeing all, feeling nothing, utterly detached, utterly objective ...’’.

=== Political thought ===
Lippmann saw nationalist separatism, imperialist competition, and failed states as key causes of war. He envisioned the eventual decline of the nation-state and its replacement with large inclusive and democratic political units.

As solution to the problem of failed states, he proposed the creation of regional authorities to provide political control, as well as education of public opinion to build support for these regional governments. He called for the creation of international organizations for each crisis region in the world: "there should be in existence permanent international commissions to deal with those spots of the earth where world crises originate."

He saw the creation of the United States in 1789 as a model for a proposed World State or supranational government, as it was possible to create a constitution to bring order to an otherwise anarchic area. Commerce and regular interactions between people from different nations would alleviate the adverse aspects of nationalism.

== Later life ==
After the fall of the British colony Singapore in February 1942, Lippmann authored an influential Washington Post column that criticized empire and called on western nations to "identify their cause with the freedom and security of the peoples of the East" and purge themselves of "white man's imperialism".

Following the removal from office of Secretary of Commerce (and former Vice President of the United States) Henry A. Wallace in September 1946, Lippmann became the leading public advocate of the need to respect a Soviet sphere of influence in Europe, as opposed to the containment strategy being advocated at the time by George F. Kennan.

Lippmann was elected to the American Philosophical Society in 1947 and the American Academy of Arts and Sciences in 1949.

Lippmann was an informal adviser to several presidents. On September 14, 1964, President Lyndon Johnson presented Lippmann with the Presidential Medal of Freedom. He later feuded with Johnson over his handling of the Vietnam War of which Lippmann had become highly critical.

He won a special Pulitzer Prize for journalism in 1958, as a nationally syndicated columnist, citing "the wisdom, perception and high sense of responsibility with which he has commented for many years on national and international affairs." In 1961, Lippmann won a Peabody Award for an interview on CBS Reports. In 1962, he won the annual Pulitzer Prize for International Reporting citing "his 1961 interview with Soviet Premier Khrushchev, as illustrative of Lippmann's long and distinguished contribution to American journalism."

Lippmann retired from his syndicated column in 1967.

Lippmann died in New York City due to cardiac arrest in 1974.

== Journalism ==
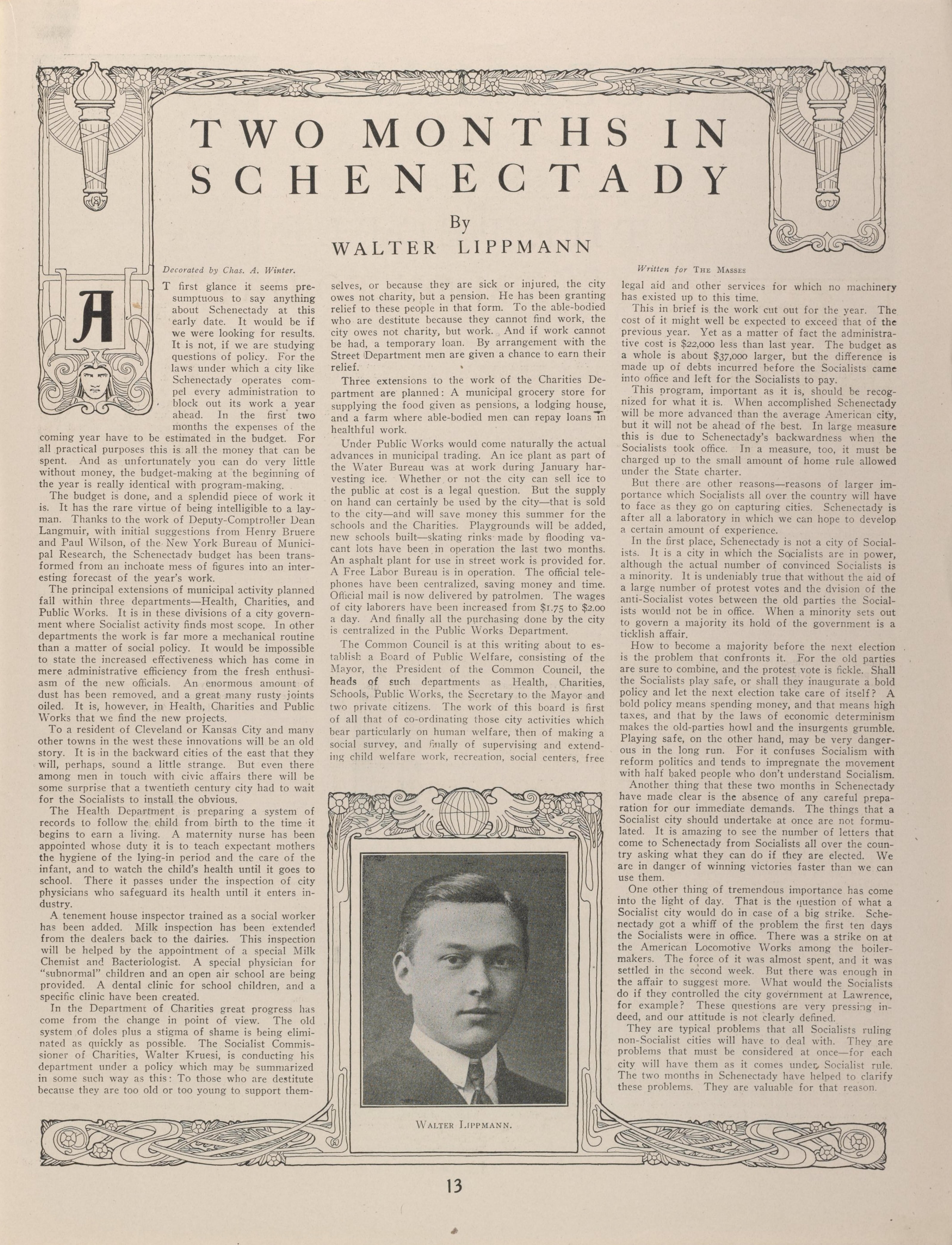
"Two Months In Schenectady," an article written by Lippmann published in The Masses, April 1912

Though a journalist himself, Lippmann did not assume that news and truth are synonymous. For Lippmann, the "function of news is to signalize an event, the function of truth is to bring to light the hidden facts, to set them in relation with each other, and make a picture of reality on which men can act." A journalist's version of the truth is subjective and limited to how they construct their reality. The news, therefore, is "imperfectly recorded" and too fragile to bear the charge as "an organ of direct democracy."

To Lippmann, democratic ideals had deteriorated: voters were largely ignorant about issues and policies and lacked the competence to participate in public life and cared little for participating in the political process. In Public Opinion (1922), Lippmann noted that modern realities threatened the stability that the government had achieved during the patronage era of the 19th century. He wrote that a "governing class" must rise to face the new challenges.

The basic problem of democracy, he wrote, was the accuracy of news and protection of sources. He argued that distorted information was inherent in the human mind. People make up their minds before they define the facts, while the ideal would be to gather and analyze the facts before reaching conclusions. By seeing first, he argued, it is possible to sanitize polluted information. Lippmann argued that interpretation as stereotypes (a word which he coined in that specific meaning) subjected us to partial truths. Lippmann called the notion of a public competent to direct public affairs a "false ideal." He compared the political savvy of an average man to a theater-goer walking into a play in the middle of the third act and leaving before the last curtain.

John Dewey in his book The Public and Its Problems, published in 1927, agreed about the irrationality of public opinion, but he rejected Lippmann's call for a technocratic elite. Dewey believed that in a democracy, the public is also part of the public discourse. The Lippmann-Dewey Debate started to be widely discussed by the late 1980s in American communication studies circles. Lippmann also figured prominently in the work Manufacturing Consent by Edward S. Herman and Noam Chomsky who cited Lippmann's advocacy of "manufacture of consent" which referred "to the management of public opinion, which [Lippmann] felt was necessary for democracy to flourish, since he felt that public opinion was an irrational force."

=== Remarks about Franklin D. Roosevelt ===
In 1932, Lippmann famously dismissed future President Franklin D. Roosevelt's qualifications and demeanor, writing: "Franklin D. Roosevelt is no crusader. He is no tribune of the people. He is no enemy of entrenched privilege. He is a pleasant man who, without any important qualifications for the office, would very much like to be President." Despite Roosevelt's later accomplishments, Lippmann stood by his words, saying: "That I will maintain to my dying day was true of the Franklin Roosevelt of 1932." He believed his judgment was an accurate summation of Roosevelt's 1932 campaign, saying it was "180 degrees opposite to the New Deal. The fact is that the New Deal was wholly improvised after Roosevelt was elected."

== Influence on mass culture ==
Lippmann was an early and influential commentator on mass culture, notable not for criticizing or rejecting mass culture entirely but discussing how it could be worked with by a government licensed "propaganda machine" to keep democracy functioning. In his first book on the subject, Public Opinion (1922), Lippmann said that mass man functioned as a "bewildered herd" who must be governed by "a specialized class whose interests reach beyond the locality." The elite class of intellectuals and experts were to be a machinery of knowledge to circumvent the primary defect of democracy, the impossible ideal of the "omnicompetent citizen".

Later, in The Phantom Public (1925), Lippmann recognized that the class of experts were also, in most respects, outsiders to any particular problem, and hence not capable of effective action. Philosopher John Dewey (1859–1952) agreed with Lippmann's assertions that the modern world was becoming too complex for every citizen to grasp all its aspects, but Dewey, unlike Lippmann, believed that the public (a composite of many "publics" within society) could form a "Great Community" that could become educated about issues, come to judgments and arrive at solutions to societal problems.

However, note that in 1942, Lippmann published his syndicated newspaper column, Today and Tomorrow: The Fifth Column on the Coast, which argued for all persons of Japanese descent, both citizens and noncitizens, to be removed from the West Coast. He argued the lack of reported sabotage by Japanese Americans on the West Coast was not evidence of their loyalty, but rather proof that a disciplined strategy was waiting for a synchronized signal from Japan.

In 1943, George Seldes described Lippmann as one of the two most influential columnists in the United States.

From the 1930s to the 1950s, Lippmann became even more skeptical of the "guiding" class. In The Public Philosophy (1955), which took almost twenty years to complete, he presented a sophisticated argument that intellectual elites were undermining the framework of democracy. The book was very poorly received in liberal circles.

== Legacy ==
The Walter Lippmann House at Harvard University, which houses the Nieman Foundation for Journalism, is named after him.

=== Almond–Lippmann consensus ===
Similarities between the views of Lippmann and Gabriel Almond produced what became known as the Almond–Lippmann consensus, which is based on three assumptions:

1. Public opinion is volatile, shifting erratically in response to the most recent developments. Mass beliefs early in the 20th century were "too pacifist in peace and too bellicose in war, too neutralist or appeasing in negotiations or too intransigent"
2. Public opinion is incoherent, lacking an organised or a consistent structure to such an extent that the views of US citizens could best be described as "nonattitudes"
3. Public opinion is irrelevant to the policy-making process. Political leaders ignore public opinion because "most Americans can neither understand nor influence the very events upon which their lives and happiness are known to depend."

=== Liberal/neoliberal debate ===
French philosopher Louis Rougier convened a meeting of primarily French and German liberal intellectuals in Paris in August 1938 to discuss the ideas put forward by Lippmann in his work The Good Society (1937). They named the meeting after Lippmann, calling it the Colloque Walter Lippmann. At the meeting, the term neoliberalism was coined by German sociologist and economist Alexander Rüstow, referring to the rejection of the old laissez-faire liberalism, and Lippmann and Rustow argued for a social liberalism against the neoclassical liberalism advocated by Friedrich von Hayek. The meeting is often considered the precursor to the first meeting of the Mont Pèlerin Society, convened by Hayek in 1947.

== Private life ==
Lippmann was married twice, the first time from 1917 to 1937 to Faye Albertson (1893–1975). Faye was the daughter of Ralph Albertson, a pastor of the Congregational Church. He was one of the pioneers of Christian socialism and the social gospel movement in the spirit of George Herron. During his studies at Harvard, Walter often visited the Albertsons' estate in West Newbury, Massachusetts, where they had founded a socialist cooperative, the (Cyrus Field) Willard Cooperative Colony.

Lippmann was divorced by Faye Albertson to be able to marry Helen Byrne Armstrong in 1938 (died 16 February 1974), daughter of James Byrne. She divorced her husband Hamilton Fish Armstrong, the editor of Foreign Affairs. He was the only close friend in Lippmann's life. The friendship and involvement in Foreign Affairs ended when a hotel in Europe accidentally forwarded Lippmann's love letters to Mr. Armstrong.

== Selected works ==
=== Articles ===
- "The Campaign Against Sweating". The New Republic, March 27, 1915.
- "What Program Shall the United States Stand for in International Relations?". Annals of the American Academy of Political and Social Science, Vol. 66, July 1916, pp. 60–70. JSTOR 1013427
- "The World Conflict in its Relation to American Democracy." Annals of the American Academy of Political and Social Science, Vol. 72, July 1917, pp. 1–10. JSTOR 1013638
- "The Basic Problem of Democracy: What Liberty Means", The Atlantic Monthly, Vol. 124, 1919, pp. 616.
- "Liberty and the News", The Atlantic Monthly, Vol. 124, 1919, pp. 779.
- "Democracy, Foreign Policy and the Split Personality of the Modern Statesman." Annals of the American Academy of Political and Social Science, Vol. 102, July 1922, pp. 190–193. JSTOR 1014825
- "Today and Tomorrow." Archived August 24, 2019, at the Wayback Machine Washington Post, February 12, 1942. Full text available Archived August 24, 2019, at the Wayback Machine.
- "A Talk With Mr. K." November 10, 1958.
- "Nearing the Brink in Vietnam." Newsweek, April 12, 1965, pp. 25–46.

=== Book reviews ===
- Review of The Intimate Papers of Colonel House by Charles Seymour Archived February 7, 2020, at the Wayback Machine. Foreign Affairs, Vol. 4, No. 3, April 1926. JSTOR 20028461 doi:10.2307/20028461

=== Essays ===
- "The Basic Problem of Democracy." November 1919, pp. 616–627 – this essay later became the first chapter Liberty and the News.
- "Concerning Senator Borah." Archived February 7, 2020, at the Wayback Machine Foreign Affairs, Vol. 4, No. 2, January 1926, pp. 211–222. JSTOR 20028440 doi:10.2307/20028440
- "Vested Rights and Nationalism in Latin-America." Archived February 7, 2020, at the Wayback Machine Foreign Affairs, Vol. 5, No. 3, April 1927, pp. 353–363. JSTOR 20028538 doi:10.2307/20028538
- "Second Thoughts on Havana." Archived February 7, 2020, at the Wayback Machine Foreign Affairs, Vol. 6, No. 4, July 1928, pp. 541–554. JSTOR 20028641 doi:10.2307/20028641
- "Church and State in Mexico: The American Mediation." Archived February 7, 2020, at the Wayback Machine Foreign Affairs, Vol. 8, No. 2, January 1930. pp. 186–207. JSTOR 20030272 doi:10.2307/20030272
- "The London Naval Conference: An American View." Archived February 7, 2020, at the Wayback Machine Foreign Affairs, Vol. 8, No. 4, July 1930, pp. 499–518. JSTOR 20030304 doi:10.2307/20030304
- "Ten Years: Retrospect and Prospect." Archived February 7, 2020, at the Wayback Machine Foreign Affairs, Vol. 11, No. 1, October 1932, pp. 51–53. JSTOR 20030482 doi:10.2307/20030482
- "Self-Sufficiency: Some Random Reflections." Archived February 7, 2020, at the Wayback Machine Foreign Affairs, Vol. 12, No. 2, January 1934, pp. 207–217. JSTOR 20030578 doi:10.2307/20030578
- "Britain and America: The Prospects of Political Cooperation in the Light of Their Paramount Interests." Archived June 2, 2021, at the Wayback Machine Foreign Affairs, Vol. 13, No. 3, April 1936, pp. 363–372. JSTOR 20030675 doi:10.2307/20030675
- "Rough-Hew Them How We Will." Archived February 7, 2020, at the Wayback Machine Foreign Affairs, Vol. 15, No. 4, July 1937, pp. 586–594. JSTOR 20028803 doi:10.2307/20028803
- "The Cold War." Foreign Affairs, Vol. 65, No. 4, Spring 1987, pp. 869–884. JSTOR 20043099 doi:10.2307/20043099

=== Reports ===
- "A Test of the News." The New Republic, Vol. 23, No. 296, August 1920. 42 pages.

=== Books ===
- A Preface to Politics. Mitchell Kennerley, 1913. ISBN 1591022924. Audiobook available.
- Drift and Mastery. University of Wisconsin Press, 1914. ISBN 0299106047. Full text available.
- The Stakes of Diplomacy. New York: Henry Holt & Co., 1915.
- The Political Scene. New York: Henry Holt & Co., 1919.
- Liberty and the News. New York: Harcourt, Brace & Howe, 1920.
- Public Opinion. New York: Harcourt, Brace & Co., 1922. ISBN 0029191300. Audiobook available.
- The Phantom Public. Piscataway, NJ: Transaction Publishers, 1925. ISBN 1560006773
- Men of Destiny. New York: The Macmillan Company, 1927. ISBN 0295950269. Excerpts available Archived May 13, 2023, at the Wayback Machine.
- American Inquisitors. New York: The Macmillan Company, 1928.
- A Preface to Morals. London: George Allen & Unwin, 1929. ISBN 0878559078
- Interpretations, 1931–1932. New York: The Macmillan Company, 1932.
- The United States in World Affairs, 1931. New York: Harper & Bros, 1932.
- The United States in World Affairs, 1932. New York: Harper & Bros, 1933.
- The Method of Freedom. New York: The Macmillan Company, 1934.
- Interpretations, 1933–1935. New York: The Macmillan Company, 1936.
- The Good Society Archived January 16, 2021, at the Wayback Machine. New York: Atlantic Monthly Press, 1937. ISBN 0765808048
- U.S. Foreign Policy: Shield of the Republic. Boston: Atlantic Monthly Press, 1943.
- U.S. War Aims. Boston: Atlantic Monthly Press, 1944. ISBN 978-0306707735
- The Cold War. New York: Harper & Row, 1947. ISBN 0061317233
- The Public Philosophy, with William O. Scroggs. New York: New American Library, 1955. ISBN 0887387918
- The Coming Tests With Russia. Boston: Atlantic Monthly Press, 1961. LCCN 61-14950

=== Pamphlets ===
- Notes on the Crisis (No. 5). New York: John Day, 1932. 28 pages.
- A New Social Order (No. 25). John Day, 1933. 28 pages.
- The New Imperative. New York: The Macmillan Company, 1935. 52 pages.

== See also ==
- Harold Lasswell
- Edward Bernays
- Progressivism
- Liberal democracy
