= Public Opinion (book) =

1922 book by Walter Lippmann

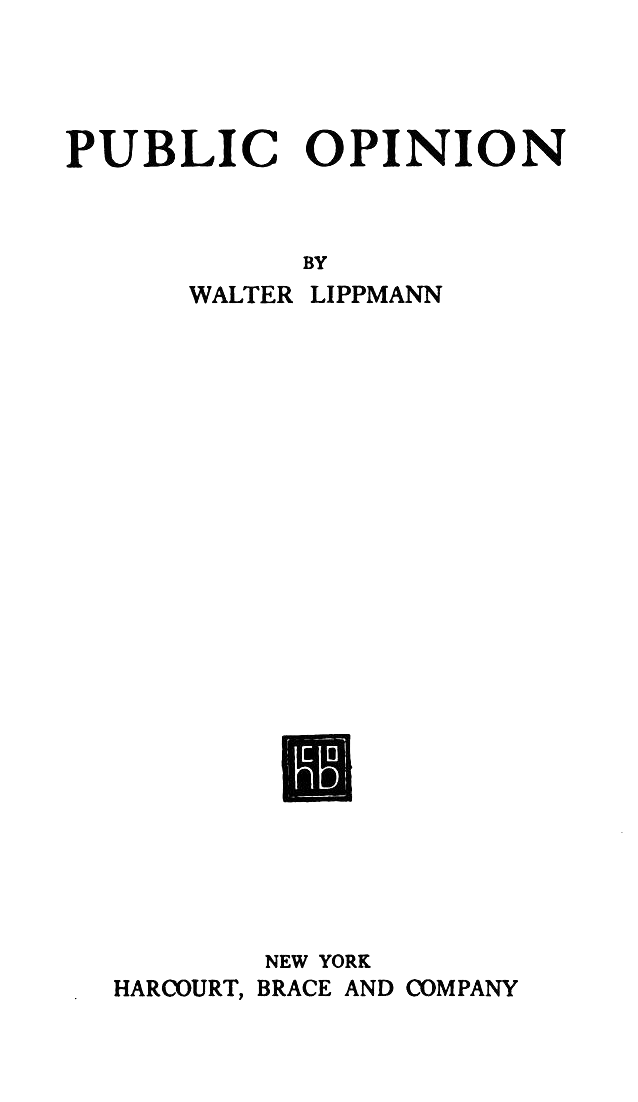
- Title page of the first edition
- Author: Walter Lippmann
- Language: English
- Subject: Public opinion
- Genre: Nonfiction
- Publisher: Harcourt, Brace & Co.
- Publication date: 1922
- Publication place: United States
- Text: Public Opinion at Wikisource

Public Opinion is a book by Walter Lippmann published in 1922 which explores the formation and management of public opinion. The source of the term the manufacture of consent, It is a critical assessment of functional democratic government, especially of the irrational and often self-serving social perceptions that influence individual behavior. As these shortcomings prevent optimal societal cohesion, leadership and opinion shaping by political elites is required to stabilize and steer a democracy.

The detailed descriptions of the cognitive limitations people face in comprehending their sociopolitical and cultural environments, leading them to apply an evolving catalogue of general stereotypes to a complex reality, rendered Public Opinion a seminal text in the fields of media studies, political science, and social psychology, and in the understanding of propaganda and social manipulation.

== Introduction ==
The introduction describes the human inability to interpret the world: "The real environment is altogether too big, too complex, and too fleeting for direct acquaintance" between people and their environment. Instead, people construct a pseudo-environment that is a subjective, biased, and necessarily abridged mental image of the world, and to a degree, everyone's pseudo-environment is a fiction. People "live in the same world, but they think and feel in different ones."

Human behavior is stimulated by the person's pseudo-environment and then is acted upon in the real world. The book highlights some general implications of the interactions among one's psychology, environment, and the mass communications media.

The modern concept of "social constructionism" or "constructed reality" has emerged as a field of study for what Lippmann (1922) called "pseudo-environment".

== News and truth ==
According to Lippmann, by definition, pertinent facts are never provided completely and accurately; by necessity they are arranged to portray a certain subjective interpretation of an event. Those who are most familiar with the greatest number of facts about a certain environment construct a pseudo-environment that aligns with their own 'stereotypes' and convey this to the public, knowingly or not, to suit their own private needs. This is inescapable human nature. Propaganda inherently exploits the disconnect between the event and the public, which can be aggravated by the barrier of censorship. Thus mass communication media, by their nature as vehicles for informational transmission, are essentially vulnerable to manipulation.

The blame for that perceptual parallax falls not upon the mass media technology (print, radio, cinema, or, inferentially, television) or logistical concerns, but upon certain members of society who attend to life with little intellectual engagement. That causes the following:

1. The buying public: the "bewildered herd" (a term here borrowed from Lippmann's The Phantom Public (1925)) must pay the mass communications media in order to understand the unseen environment. "For a dollar, you may not even get an armful of candy, but for a dollar or less people expect reality/representations of truth to fall into their laps." The media have the social function of transmitting public affairs information, and do so for a profit.
2. Nature of news: already published news is generally less disputable. Officially-available public matters will constitute "the news" and unofficial (private) matters are unavailable, are less available, or are used as "issues" for propaganda.
3. News truth and conclusion: the production and conveyance of news is a consequence of editorial selection and judgement; journalism creates and sows the seeds (news) that establish public opinion.

== Manufacture of consent ==
Lippman argues that, when properly deployed in the public interest, the manufacture of consent is useful and necessary for a democratic society, because, in many cases, "the common interests" of the public are not obvious except upon careful analysis of the collected data, a critical intellectual exercise in which most people are uninterested or are incapable of doing.

That the manufacture of consent is capable of great refinements no one, I think, denies. The process by which public opinions arise is certainly no less intricate than it has appeared in these pages, and the opportunities for manipulation open to anyone who understands the process are plain enough. . . . [a]s a result of psychological research, coupled with the modern means of communication, the practice of democracy has turned a corner. A revolution is taking place, infinitely more significant than any shifting of economic power.... Under the impact of propaganda, not necessarily in the sinister meaning of the word alone, the old constants of our thinking have become variables. It is no longer possible, for example, to believe in the original dogma of democracy; that the knowledge needed for the management of human affairs comes up spontaneously from the human heart. Where we act on that theory we expose ourselves to self-deception, and to forms of persuasion that we cannot verify. It has been demonstrated that we cannot rely upon intuition, conscience, or the accidents of casual opinion if we are to deal with the world beyond our reach.

— Walter Lippmann, Public Opinion, Chapter XV

The political elite are members of the class of people who are incapable of accurately understanding, by themselves, the complex "unseen environment" wherein the public affairs of the modern state occur; thus, Lippmann proposes that a professional, "specialized class" collect and analyze data, and present their conclusions to the society's decision makers, who, in their turn, use the "art of persuasion" to inform the public about the decisions and circumstances affecting them.

== Influence ==
In his 1927 book The Public and Its Problems, philosopher and educational reformer John Dewey, agreed that the general public is irrational, but rejected Lippman's call for a technocratic elite. Dewey believed that in a democracy, the people are also part of the public discourse. These contrasting opinions were discussed in the Lippmann-Dewey debate, which started to be widely discussed by the late 1980s in American communication studies circles.

Lippmann also figured prominently in work by academics Edward S. Herman and Noam Chomsky, notably in their 1988 book, Manufacturing Consent: The Political Economy of the Mass Media. The pair argued that Lippmann's advocacy of "manufacture of consent" was rooted in "the management of public opinion, which Lippmann felt was necessary for democracy to flourish, since he felt that public opinion was an irrational force."
