= Journey Among Warriors =

1943 book by Ève Curie

- First edition (US)
- Author: Ève Curie
- Language: English
- Genre: Literary reportage
- Publisher: Doubleday (US); Heinemann (UK)
- Publication date: 1943
- Publication place: United States
- Media type: Print (Hardcover)
- Pages: 501
- Preceded by: Madame Curie

Journey Among Warriors is a book of war reportage by the French-American journalist and writer Ève Curie, first published in 1943, in which the author described her experiences during her trip to Africa, the Near East, Soviet Union, China, Burma and India, where she traveled from November 1941 to April 1942.

== Origin of the book ==
The author of Journey Among Warriors, French pianist, journalist and writer Ève Curie (daughter of Marie and Pierre Curie), fled to the United Kingdom after the surrender of France in June 1940, where she joined the Free French Forces and General Charles de Gaulle. She fought Nazism mainly as a journalist, publishing articles and giving lectures. She spent the war years mostly in Britain and the United States, writing articles for New York Herald Tribune.

In November 1941, her employers – Herald Tribune Syndicate from New York City and Allied Newspapers Limited from London – decided to send Ève Curie as a reporter on a journey to the countries in which warfare had already been waging. Ève was to visit Africa, the Near East, the Soviet Union, China and to return via Singapore, the Pacific Ocean and San Francisco to the East Coast of the US, her planned journey being, in fact, a trip around the world.

The Japanese attack on Pearl Harbor on December 7, 1941 resulted in modifying these plans. After Ève Curie had reached China, she could not continue her journey to Singapore, which had already been taken by the Japanese, so she returned, also via Asia and Africa, to the US. She systematically wrote reports from the journey to the newspapers which employed her, and on the basis of these reports, the book Journey Among Warriors was published in 1943.

== Synopsis ==
Journey Among Warriors consists of five parts, each describing one stage in the author's journey.

=== Part I – Africa ===
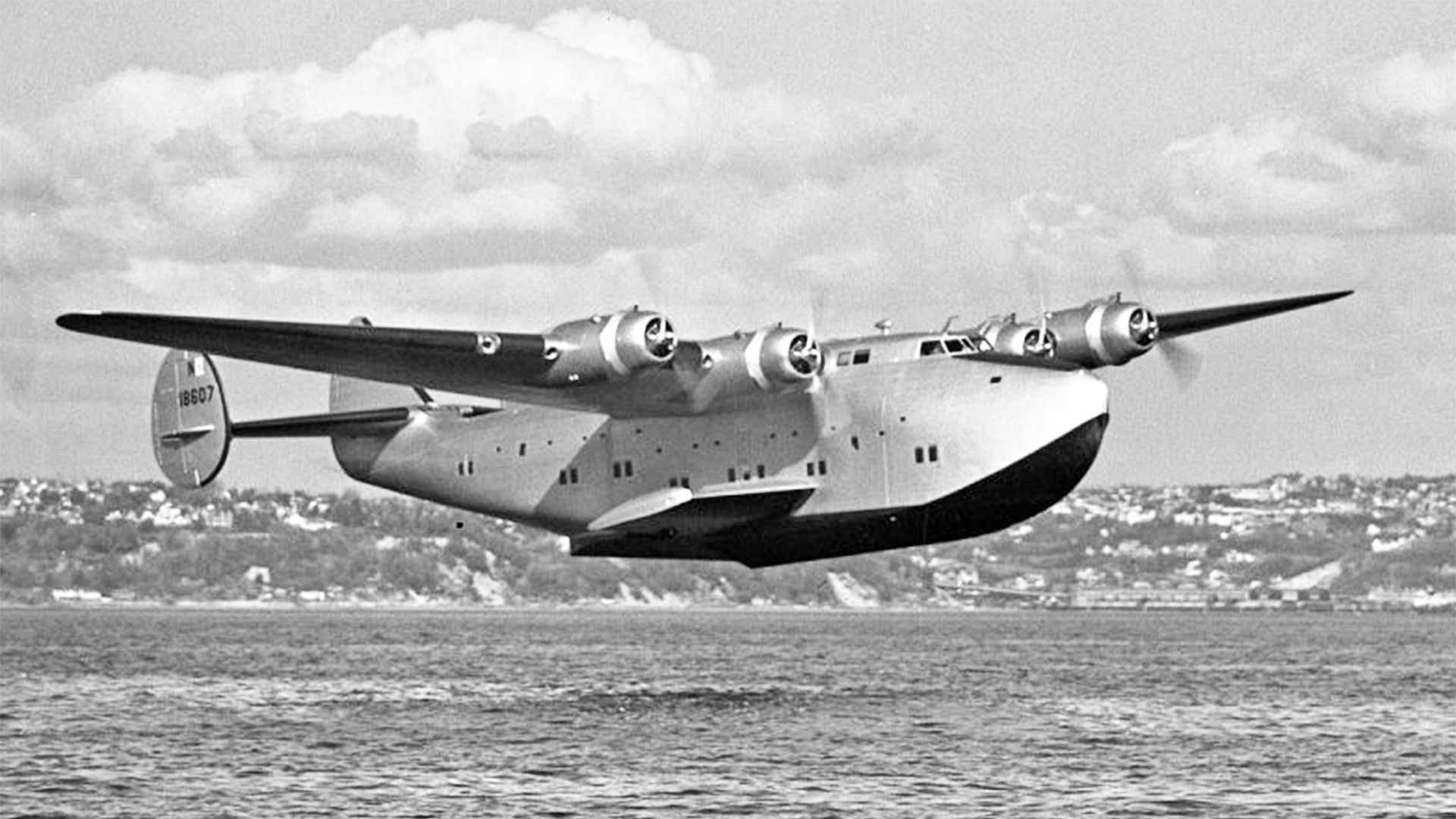
Boeing 314 Clipper, on which Ève Curie reached Africa

Ève Curie's journey started on November 10, 1941 when she set off from New York to Africa on board a Boeing 314 Clipper. This was the first, experimental flight of this huge flying boat from America to the west coast of the African continent, which was why it was kept secret both by Pan American World Airways, which operated the airline, and the American government. Ève was the only woman and the only journalist among the 40 passengers or so of the flying boat; most of her travel companions being members of the staff of Pan Am who were flying to Africa to prepare the infrastructure for the planned flight service on which war supplies (including military planes) were to be transported from the US to the Middle East (even though the United States was a non-belligerent country at that time, it actively supported the Allies with supplies of war equipment).

Via Bermuda, Puerto Rico, Trinidad and the Brazilian coast Ève Curie reached Bathurst in the Gambia and then Lagos in Nigeria (which were British colonies then). Even though there was no warfare waged on the West African coast at that time, the threat from the Axis powers was felt everywhere in the region, and everybody worked at full steam to provide supplies to the front. In Nigeria, Ève also first met her Polish half-compatriots – a Captain Izicki told her how Polish and British pilots ferried the planes assembled in West Africa in convoys over the jungles and deserts to Sudan and later to Egypt.

From Nigeria, Ève Curie flew to Khartoum in Sudan, with stopovers, among others, in Kano, where she met the local emir, and Fort-Lamy in Chad, which was controlled by the Free French. In Khartoum she learned about the offensive the British had started in Cyrenaica, and she left for Egypt to write a report about the fights.

Despite the initial reservations of the military, who opposed to a woman being so close to the front line, Ève, thanks to the help of Randolph Churchill (Winston Churchill's son), managed to come near the places in Libya where the British fought the German and Italian troops in desert areas, in very unfavorable climatic conditions.

Having returned to Egypt, Ève also visited a harbor on the Red Sea where American ships with supplies for the fighting British were being unloaded, and on December 8 she was shocked to learn about the Japanese attack on Pearl Harbor. When she later heard about further conquests of the Japanese in the Far East, she realized that she might not fulfill her plans to reach Singapore.

=== Part II – The Near East ===
From Cairo, Ève Curie flew first to Beirut where she met General Georges Catroux, who had been appointed by de Gaulle High Commissioner to the Levant. The reporter also made herself acquainted with the situation in Syria and Palestine. Even though the Free French controlled these territories, they still had to cope with the problem of political sabotage operations conducted by the Germans and the Italians, who were broadcasting radio programs aimed at the local Arab population. These acts of sabotage also took on graver forms – anti-British feeling in nearby Iraq, which had been growing for some time, resulted in breaking out of the Anglo-Iraqi War in 1941.

After several days, Ève flew from Lydda Airport farther to the east, to Teheran, the capital of Iran. Formally, during the World War II, Iran was an independent and neutral country; in fact, since August 1941, it had been under common British-Soviet occupation. The concern about the growing German influence in Iran, the willingness to secure the local oil deposits and, first of all, the importance of Iran as a transit country for supplies of war equipment to the Soviet Union resulted in an Anglo-Soviet intervention. The British and Soviet troops occupied the country, forced Reza Shah Pahlavi to abdicate and brought his son, Mohammad Reza Pahlavi to the throne. Since then to the end of the war, Iran was a very important communication hub – a transit country via which Western militaries and diplomats were traveling to the Soviet Union and one of the channels through which American war equipment was sent to the USSR under the Lend-Lease Act.

In Teheran, Ève Curie had to wait for several weeks for an opportunity to leave for the Soviet Union. She spent this time, meeting politicians and soldiers, including the Prime Minister of the Republic of Poland in exile and the Commander-in-Chief of the Polish Army Władysław Sikorski, who, despite his country's negative experiences with the USSR (in September 1939, Poland had been invaded both by Nazi Germany and the Soviet Union, and many Poles were deported by the Soviets to Siberia, Kazakhstan and other regions of the interior of the USSR), still hoped for a common fight of Polish soldiers on the side of the Soviets against the Germans. In Teheran, Curie also had a meeting with Shah Reza Pahlavi, who, probably because of his young age (he was only 22 years old), did not feel fully comfortable on the throne yet.

=== Part III – Russia ===
Ève left Teheran on January 6, 1942, flying via Baku to Kuybyshev (now Samara), where the embassies and many Soviet central offices had been evacuated to from Moscow because of the threatening German offensive at the end of 1941. Already on board the plane she could observe the frozen Caspian Sea; biting frost and snow were to accompany her during her whole stay in the USSR. In Kuybyshev she met wounded soldiers in the local hospital, visited a bearings factory evacuated from Moscow where workers labored and lived in extremely difficult conditions, she also attended a service in an Orthodox church and talked to its priest (after the outbreak of the war, Joseph Stalin had slightly alleviated his policy of persecutions of religion). Both in Baku, Kuybyshew and later in Moscow, Ève could see how important culture, even though much ideologized, was for the fighting Soviet Union – she watched theatrical and opera performances and went to other cultural events, in Kuybyshew she also interviewed Olga Lepeshinskaya, an outstanding Soviet ballerina of that time.

During her stay in the USSR Ève Curie was constantly "looked after" by Lieutenant Liuba Mieston, who was officially her translator, but in fact, as Curie was guessing, worked for NKVD and supervised her contacts with the inhabitants of the Soviet Union. Despite this, both women became friends, Ève wrote very warmly about Liuba in her memoirs.

After several days of efforts, Ève succeeded in obtaining a permission to visit the front line. On January 12 (before other foreign correspondents, who stayed in Kuybyshev) she flew on a military plane with Liuba to Moscow, and on January 15 she could leave the capital for the places where fights were going on. In December 1941, as a result of the so-called Battle of Moscow, the Soviets had managed to repel the Germans from the capital; the hostilities were now going on around 60 miles from the borders of the city. On her way to the front, Curie could see many examples of atrocities the Germans committed on civilians – burnt down villages and towns; their inhabitants who were now coming back told her about robberies and mass executions conducted by the Nazis. Now, the German troops were withdrawing, and their defeat was also the result of harsh climatic conditions – this was the first winter for the Germans on the east front for which they were not prepared either in terms of clothing or military equipment. Many times, Ève saw corpses of German soldiers on the snow.

After they had arrived in Volokolamsk, Ève and Liuba also had an interesting meeting with General Andrey Vlasov, the commander of the Soviet troops fighting at Moscow. Vlasov appeared to her as a faithful soldier and Soviet patriot; she did not know yet that after a few months he would be taken prisoner by the Germans and defect to the Nazis as the commander of the Russian Liberation Army.

On January 18, Ève again left Moscow to visit just relieved Tula (it had been besieged by the Germans from October to December 1941) and Lev Tolstoy's house in Yasnaya Polyana. In Tula, the local secretary of the Communist party Zhavoronkov told her about the hardships of the three-month siege; in the town, Ève also met one of local Soviet partisans (guerillas) – Esipov, a carpenter, who had fought the Germans behind the frontline. On the next day (January 19), Ève and Liuba, accompanied by Sophia Andreyevna Tolstoy (Lev Tolstoy's grandniece), who supervised all Tolstoy's museums in the USSR, visited Tolstoy's family house in Yasnaya Polyana, which the Germans had converted into a mess for Wehrmacht officers and tried to burn down when they were withdrawing.

Ève also wanted to see the siege of Leningrad but was refused a permit to fly to the city, so she stayed in the capital for some time, observing the daily life of its inhabitants, taking part in Moscow's cultural life (she saw for example the opera Eugene Onegin by Tchaikovsky) and meeting scientists at the Geological Institute and the Academy of Sciences of the USSR, where she learnt about huge losses (running into millions) of the Soviet army on the front.

The last trip to the areas where hostilities were going on was a short visit to Mozhaysk, where she went on January 23, just one day after the Germans had been driven from it. Again, she could hear about the atrocities of the Nazis, who had buried 200 people alive in the blown-up cathedral and tried to burn down the town. Ève also had the opportunity to talk to German soldiers who were taken prisoner and see how much their morale had lowered, because of the severe winter and defeats on the front.

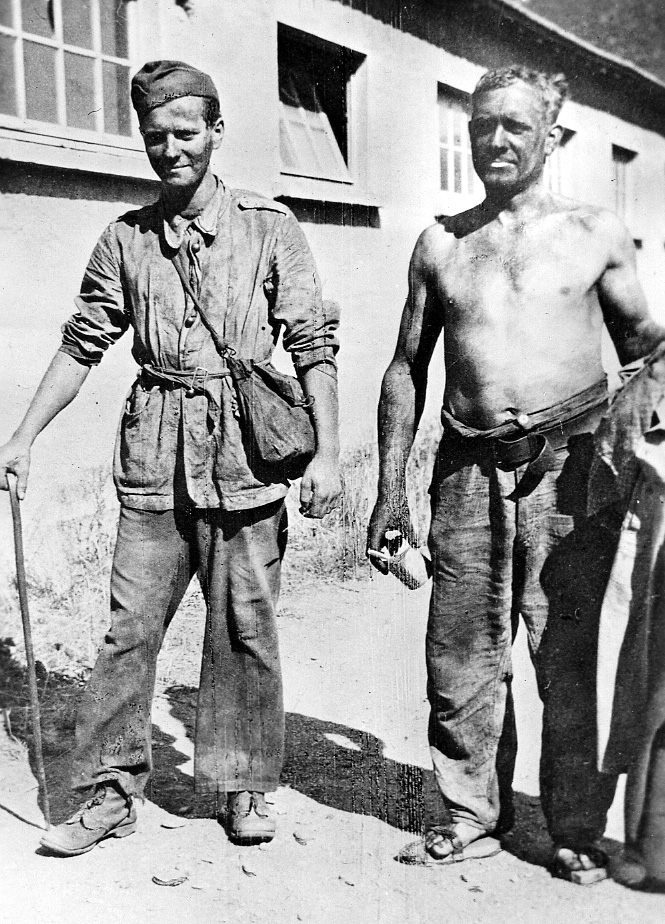
Polish volunteers to the Anders Army, released from Gulag labor camps

On January 26, Ève flew back from Moscow to Kuybyshev to catch the return plane to Iran. She spent the time of waiting for the plane mostly in the Polish embassy where she met the ambassador Stanisław Kot and many Polish soldiers who had just been released from Gulag labor camps and wanted to join the Polish army which was just being formed under the command of General Władysław Sikorski. She learnt from an officer named Grzybowski (who was also a pianist, like Ève) about the life in an officers' camp in Vologda in northern Russia; an unnamed aristocrat, who was arrested in 1939 and also spent a long time in a Soviet prison, told her about the comfort religion gave him during that time. Ève also learnt about the tragic fate of many other Poles who were deported to remote regions of the country and about the difficulties the Polish authorities had to cope with to find them in the depths of Russia. She could also see how determined both the Polish military and the civilians were to get out of the USSR and return to Poland. In a conversation with her, General Anders gave voice to this desire saying: "We will get to Poland. Not all of us, of course, But Poland will live."

Ève Curie's description of her stay in the Soviet Union took up most space in her book; this was also the stage of her journey which most impressed her. Ève's attitude towards the Soviet reality was ambivalent. On the one hand, she perceived the authoritarian character of the Soviet political system, the political and religious persecutions, she realized that many of the people she talked to (for example the priest in the Orthodox church in Kuybyshev) were afraid to tell even her – a Western correspondent – openly what they thought about the life in the USSR; meeting Polish exiles in the USSR, she also learned the truth (or at least part of it) about Communist crimes in the Soviet Union. On the other hand, she was full of admiration for the sacrifice of ordinary soldiers and civilians fighting the invaders; her fascination for the Soviet system, which was so different from the systems in other countries which were known to her, can be seen in many places of the book. Ève Curie certainly was not one of the "fellow travelers", who sympathized with Communist ideology and the Soviet Union, but she was not their fierce critic either.

=== Part IV – Asia ===
Ève Curie flew back from Kuybyshev to Iran on January 29, 1942. In Teheran, she learnt about furthers conquests of the Japanese in the Far East; nevertheless, she made an attempt to reach Singapore. She went by train to Abadan, the seat of the Anglo-Persian Oil Company, then by plane to Basra, where she again heard about the pro-German sympathies of the Iraqis, finally from Basra by flying boat to Calcutta in India, which she reached on February 8. The journey to Singapore was no longer possible (the Japanese conquered the city on February 15, after a week's siege), so instead Ève flew to Burma, which was also a British colony then.

In Burma, Curie was staying in Lashio, in the north-eastern part of the country, at the house of Arthur Porter, the British Commissioner for the Northern Shan States. She also visited Rangoon and other places; throughout the country she could feel tension because of the attacking Japanese. In Burma, for the third time during her journey, Ève was also in close proximity of the front. On the 15th of February she drove in a station wagon forward of the British positions at the Bilin River with the intention of traveling to Thaton which was in the process of being evacuated. She was eventually ordered to turn around by British officers at an outpost along the road as she was approaching the no mans land between the British and Japanese armies. The British army was commanded in this area by General John George Smyth, who told her about the difficult situation of his troops – the Japanese had better equipment than the British, they also fought fanatically and ruthlessly in the jungle. Because of these factors, all the bravery and dedication to fight of the British and Indian soldiers were in vain: Ève witnessed the chaotic evacuation of the British and other foreigners from Rangoon, who were escaping the approaching Japanese.

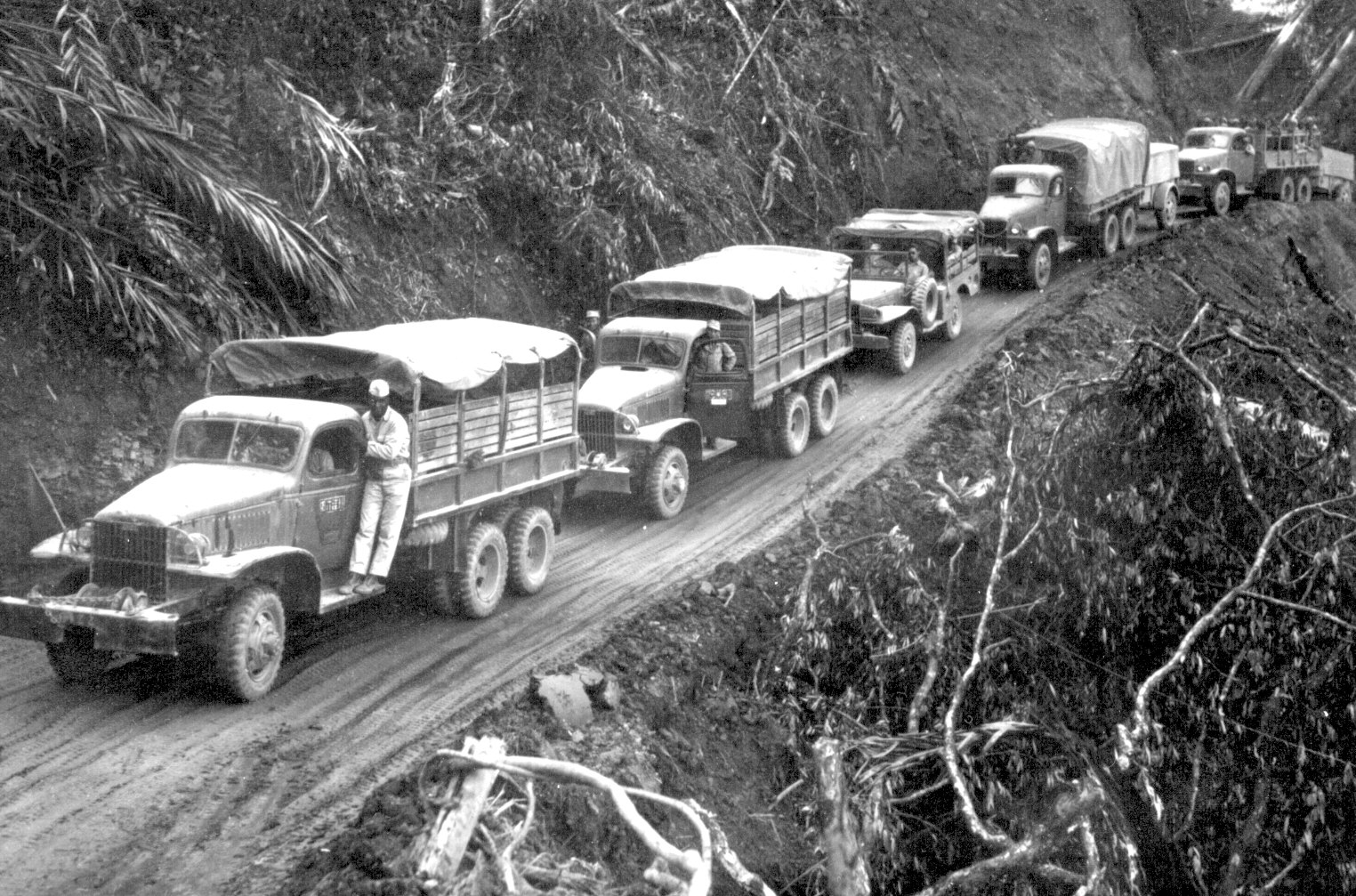
Convoy of army trucks on the Ledo Road

In her book, Ève Curie also described in detail the Burma Road, running through mountainous areas from Lashio to the Chinese province of Yunnan. This was the main road on which Chinese drivers, in difficult terrain conditions, often at the risk of their lives, transported war supplies for their country, which had been warring with Japan since 1937.

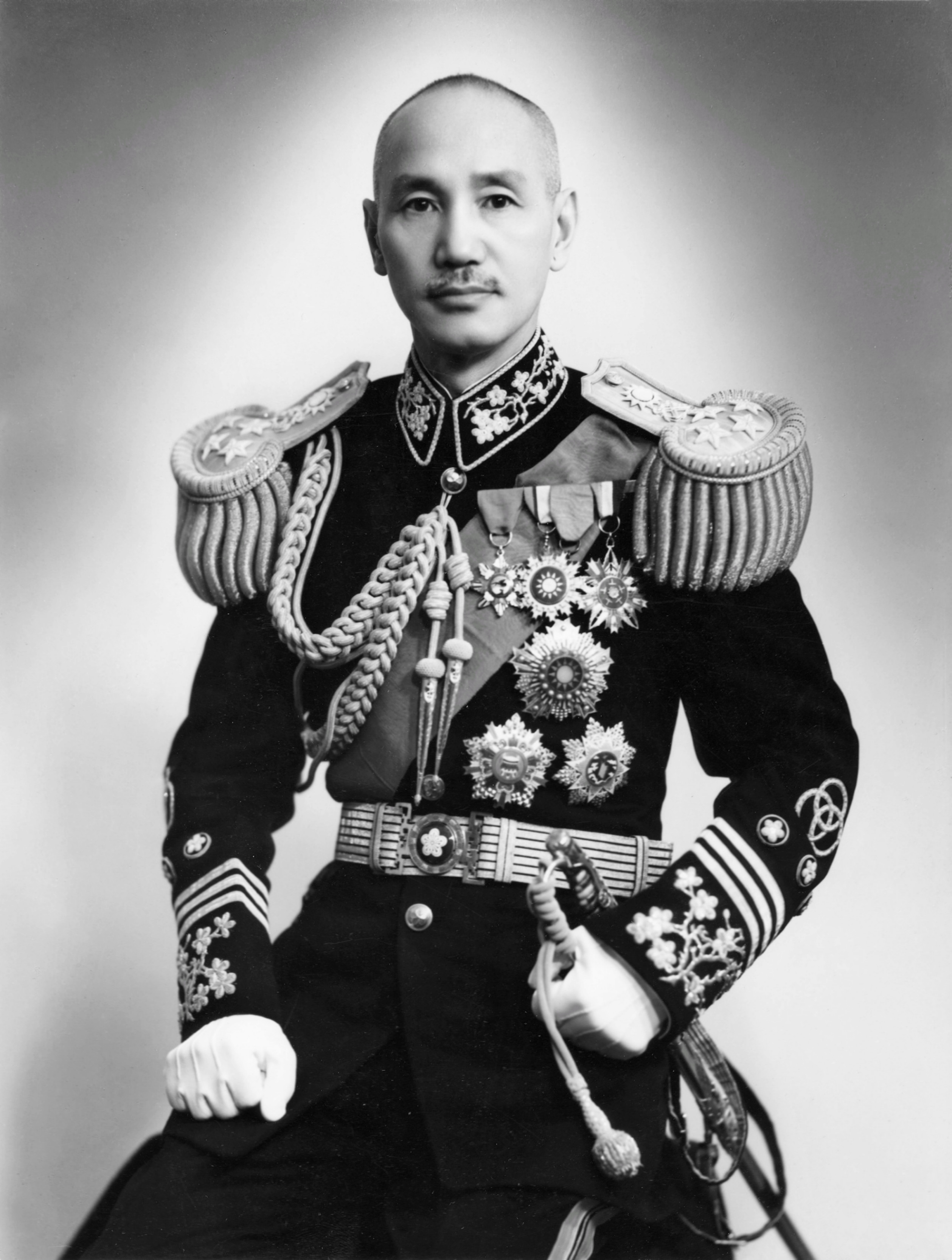
Chiang Kai-shek

The next stage in Ève Curie' journey was her visit to China, where to she flew by plane from Lashio. She spent most of the time in this country in Chungking, which was the provisional capital during the Second Sino-Japanese War in the years 1937-1945 and the seat of the government of Generalissimo Chiang Kai-shek, which was the reason why it was often bombed by Japanese planes. China had been in a grave political crisis since the 1920s; the war with the external aggressor overlapped with the Chinese Civil War against Mao Zedongs Communists, which started in 1927. Ève also visited the Province of Sichuan with its capital Chengtu, where she could see the difficult living condition (often extreme poverty) of the local population and where she also visited Chinese military schools.

Back in Chungking, Ève also met the Communist General Zhou Enlai, who was a sort of envoy of the Communists to Chiang Kai-shek' central government, the widow of Sun Yat-sen (the Father of the Republic of China), finally Chiang Kai-shek himself and his Americanized wife Soong Mei-ling, known as Madame Chiang Kai-shek.

On her way back from China to India, Ève Curie also met one of the so-called Flying Tigers, and during a stopover in Kunming she could interview their commander – Claire Lee Chennault. The Flying Tigers were American pilots who had been fighting the Japanese voluntarily in the ranks of the Chinese air force since 1941; they were known as daring, even though often undisciplined soldiers.

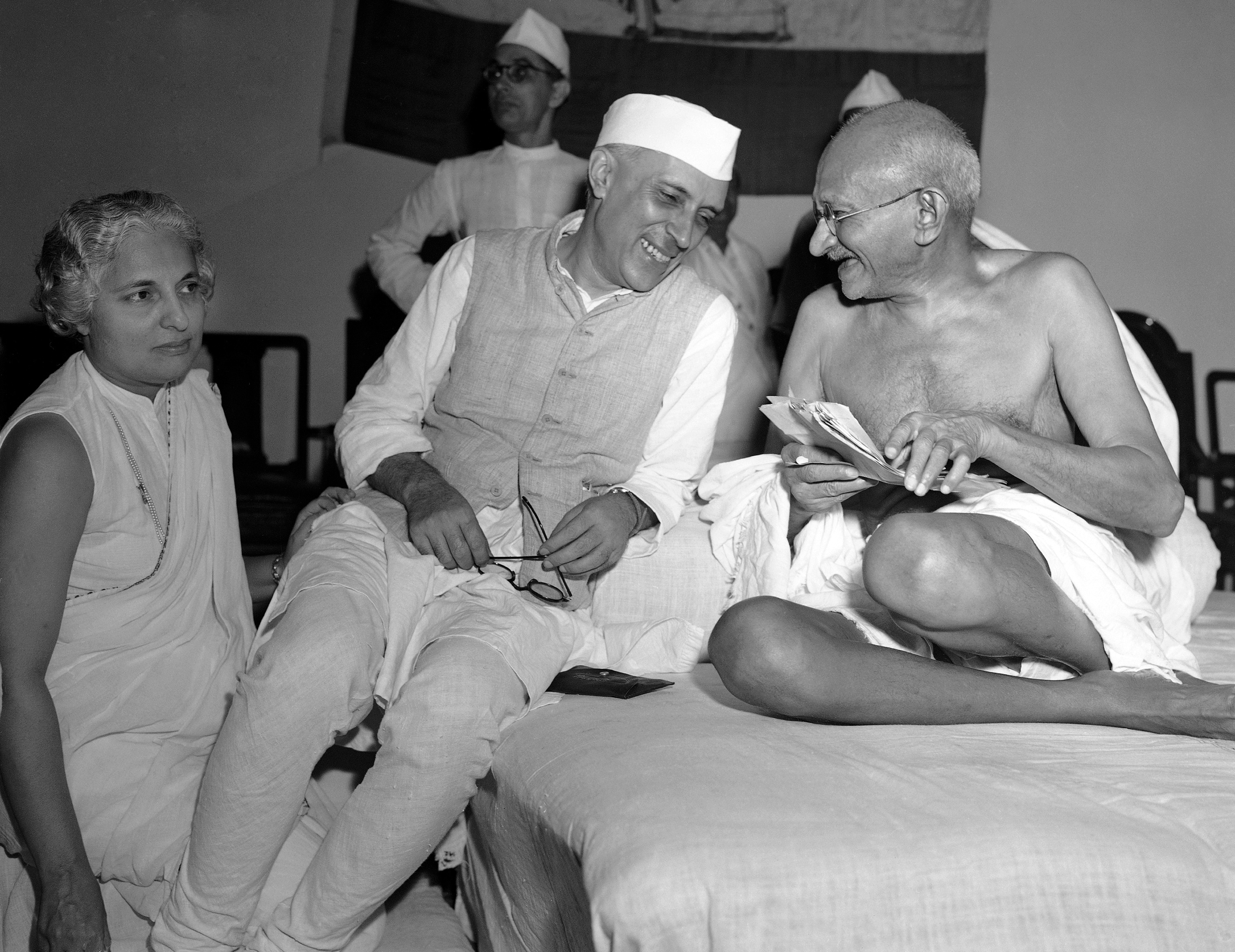
Gandhi and Nehru in 1942

Having returned from China to Calcutta, Ève could observe the growing fear of the Japanese invasion which could be felt in the city and the whole of Bengal. India's economy had already been mobilized for war production since 1939; the Indians themselves, however, were not fully convinced of the necessity of this war effort and sacrificing their lives for Britain. Already flying from Basra to Calcutta in February, during a stopover in Karachi, Ève Curie had first met sympathizers of the Indian National Congress; now she could talk to more and more nationalists demanding independence for their country. Going by train from Calcutta to Delhi, Curie also made a short visit to Allahabad, where she met Jawaharlal Nehru, a prominent member of the Congress, representing its left wing, and his daughter Indira Gandhi (the future Prime Minister of India), who was just getting ready for her wedding (on the following day she was to marry Feroze Gandhi). Nehru explained to Curie his views on India's independence, which was becoming a more and more urgent issue in the British Empire. Curie's stay in India coincided with the visit of Stafford Cripps, Lord Privy Seal, who came from Britain to present some new proposals of the British government aiming at increasing India's autonomy (Ève also had a meeting with him in New Delhi). The British proposals, however, were received rather coolly by the Indians, who demanded "independence now", as their slogan went.

After arriving in New Delhi, Ève was staying in the residence of General Archibald Wavell, commander of the British forces in the Far East. There she also met Victor Hope, 2nd Marquess of Linlithgow, the reigning Viceroy of India; the most important event on this stage of her journey was, however, her meeting with Mahatma Gandhi on March 28. During that meeting, which greatly impressed her, Gandhi presented her his philosophy of nonviolent resistance and non-opposing the evil, even facing the German and Japanese threat and the danger of physical elimination by the enemy.

Soon after this conversation, Ève also met Muhammad Ali Jinnah, the leader of the Muslim League and the future founder of Pakistan. As a result of the meeting, she became aware of how great the scale of religious conflicts between the Hinduists and the Muslims is and realized that the country may disintegrate after regaining independence.

=== Part V – Back to America ===
Ève Curie set off on her return journey from New Delhi to America on April 4, 1942, on a flying boat traveling via the Near East, Africa and South America. The United States was already openly taking part in the war, so everywhere she met American soldiers, pilots and technicians, in service along with the British, Free French and soldiers from other countries. The last pages of the book are a hymn praising the cooperation of the Allies, American values, freedom and democracy in the fight with the German and Japanese invaders.

== Significance of Journey Among Warriors ==
Journey Among Warriors is not a piece of war reportage in the strict sense of the word. During her 5-month journey Ève Curie was only three times in the immediate vicinity of the front line: during the fights in the Libyan Desert, in the Soviet Union and in Burma. Nevertheless, the book is an important document showing the events of the Second World War, not only in the direct combat zone but also in the hinterland. Ève Curie wrote not only about military operations but also logistic processes supporting them (for example Lend-Lease supplies of American equipment), problems connected with equipping of millions of soldiers etc. During her journey, Ève often met high military commanders and politicians, which gives the reader insight into the behind-the-scenes of World War II. Some of Curie's interlocutors became widely known already after the publication of the book, for example the Shah of Iran Mohammad Reza Pahlavi, the commander of the Russian Liberation Army Andrey Vlasov, or the Chinese military and politician Zhou Enlai, which only increases the value of the book as a historical source quoting their opinions.

Another value of Journey Among Warriors is its documentary character – the book depicts the life of civilians in the warring countries, their sacrifice, daily toil, joys and hardships. The descriptions of the life in the Soviet Union and China are especially valuable here. The author does not always remain objective, displaying a fascinated view of the Soviet Union; however, even in this respect, her book is an important historical source.

== Reception of Journey Among Warriors ==
Journey Among Warriors, which was published in 1943 (the war was still going on then), received a favorable reception by the public and critics, even though it was sometimes criticized for its excessive length (the book is over 500 pages long). In 1944, Journey Among Warriors was nominated for the Pulitzer Prize for Correspondence; eventually, it was not awarded the prize, which went to Ernest Taylor Pyle, also for war correspondence. After the war, the book was not reissued and it was largely forgotten.

== Bibliography ==
- Curie, Ève (1943). Journey Among Warriors. Doubleday, Doran and Co., Inc.
