= The Phantom Public =

Book by Walter Lippmann

- Author: Walter Lippmann
- Language: English
- Subject: Political philosophy
- Genre: Nonfiction
- Publisher: Transaction Publishers
- Publication date: 1925
- Publication place: United States
- Media type: Print
- Pages: 195
- ISBN: 1-56000-677-3
- LC Class: HM 261 .L74 1993

The Phantom Public is a book published in 1925 by journalist Walter Lippmann in which he expresses his lack of faith in the democratic system by arguing that the public exists merely as an illusion, myth, and inevitably a phantom. As Carl Bybee wrote, "For Lippmann the public was a theoretical fiction and government was primarily an administrative problem to be solved as efficiently as possible, so that people could get on with their own individualistic pursuits".

== Context ==
The Phantom Public was published in 1925 following Lippmann's experiences observing the manipulation of public opinion during World War I and the rise of fascism in Benito Mussolini's Italy. It followed his better-known work Public Opinion (1922) and moves further toward disillusionment with democratic politics. The book provoked a response from philosopher John Dewey, who argued in The Public and its Problems (1927) that the public was not a phantom but merely "in eclipse" and that robust democratic politics are possible. Today, the exchange between Lippmann and Dewey continues to be important for the critique of contemporary journalism, and press critics such as New York University's Jay Rosen invoke it to support moves toward civic journalism.

== Synopsis ==
Lippmann’s book is a forceful critique of what he takes to be mistaken conceptions of "the public" found in democratic theory like that it is made up of sovereign and omnicompetent citizens (21); "the people" are a sort of superindividual with one will and one mind (160) or an "organism with an organic unity of which the individual is a cell" (147); the public directs the course of events (77); it is a knowable body with fixed membership (110); it embodies cosmopolitan, universal, disinterested intuition (168-9); and it is a dispenser of law or morals (106). Lippmann counters that the public is none of those things but a "mere phantom," an abstraction (77) embedded in a "false philosophy" (200) that depends on a "mystical notion of society" (147). Democratic theories, he argues, vaguely assert that the public can act competently to direct public affairs and that the functioning of government is the will of the people, but Lippmann dismisses such notions of the capacities of the public as a fiction.

Against the idealizations and obfuscations, Lippmann posits that society is made up of two types of people: agents and bystanders (also referred to as insiders and outsiders). The agent is someone who can act "executively" on the basis of his own opinions to address the substance of an issue, and the bystander is the public, merely a spectator of action. Only those familiar enough with the substance of a problem are able to then analyze it and propose solutions, to take "executive action." No one is of executive capacity at all times, the myth of the omnicompetent sovereign democratic citizen. Instead, individuals move in and out of these capacities: "The actors in one affair are the spectators of another, and men are continually passing back and forth between the field where they are executives and the field where they are members of a public. The distinction between agents and bystanders... is not an absolute one" (110). Most of the time, however, the public is just a "deaf spectator in the back row"(13) because, for the most part, individuals are more interested in their private affairs and their individual relations than in those matters that govern society, the public questions about which they know very little.

According to Lippmann, however, the public has one specific role and one particular capacity, to intervene during a moment of social disturbance or "a crisis of maladjustment.... It is the function of public opinion to check the use of force" (74) by using its own force. Public opinion responds to failures in the administration of government by deciding, through voting, whether to throw one party out in favor or another. The public, however, moves to such action not by its own volition but by being led there by the insiders who can identify and assess the situation for them. The public is incapable of deciding rationally about whether there is a crisis: "Public opinion is not a rational force.... It does not reason, investigate, invent, persuade, bargain or settle" (69). It can exert force upon those capable of direct action only by making a judgment as to which group is better able to address the problem at hand: "When men take a position in respect to the purposes of others they are acting as a public" (198). That check on arbitrary force is the most that can be expected of the public. It is the highly circumscribed but "special purpose" of public opinion.

== Quotes ==
The public must be put in its place [...] so that each of us may live free of the trampling and the roar of a bewildered herd.

— p.145

The fundamental difference which matters is that between insiders and outsiders. Their relations to a problem are radically different. Only the insiders can make decisions, not because he is inherently a better man but because he is so placed that he can understand and can act. The outsider is necessarily ignorant, usually irrelevant and often meddlesome, because he is trying to navigate the ship from dry land. [...] In short, like the democratic theorists, they miss the essence of the matter, which is, that competence exists only in relation to function; that men are not good, but good for something.; that men cannot be educated, but only educated for something

— p.140

== See also ==
- Social influence
- Types of democracy
  - Liberal democracy
  - Procedural democracy
- Neoliberalism
- Post-factual politics
