= The Public and Its Problems =

1927 book by John Dewey

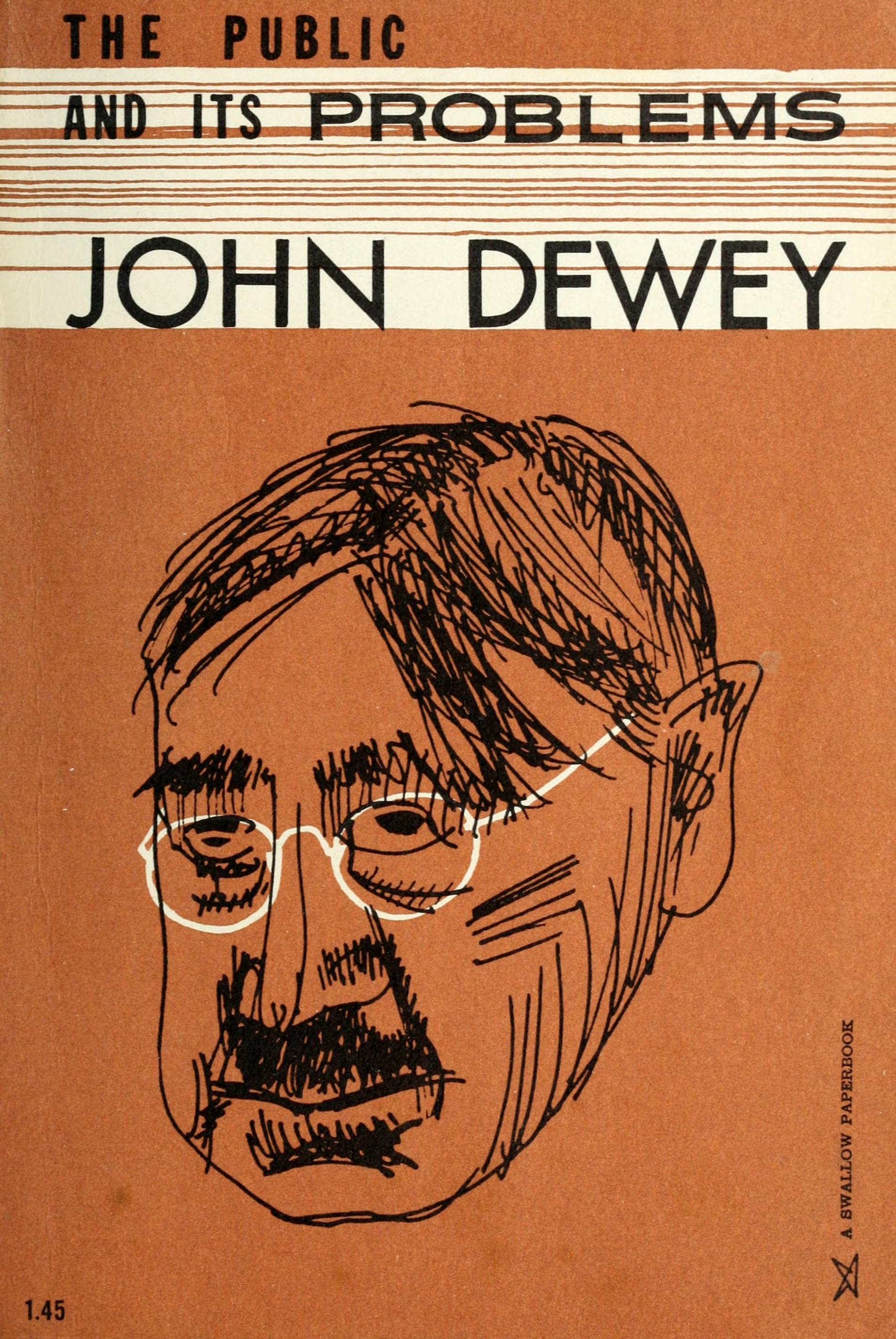
- Author: John Dewey
- Language: English
- Subject: Political philosophy
- Genre: non-fiction
- Publisher: Henry Holt and Company
- Publication date: 1927
- Publication place: United States
- Media type: Print
- Pages: 195

The Public and Its Problems is a 1927 book by American philosopher John Dewey. In his first major work on political philosophy, Dewey explores the viability and creation of a genuinely democratic society in the face of the major technological and social changes of the 20th century, and seeks to better define what both the 'public' and the 'state' constitute, how they are created, and their major weaknesses in understanding and propagating their own interests and the public good. Dewey rejects a then-popular notion of political technocracy as an alternative system of governing an increasingly complex society, but rather sees democracy as the most viable and sustainable means to achieving the public interest, albeit a flawed and routinely subverted one. He contends that democracy is an ethos and an ongoing project that requires constant public vigilance and engagement to be effective, rather than merely a set of institutional arrangements, an argument he would later expand upon most influentially in his essay "Creative Democracy: The Task Before Us". The Public and its Problems is a major contribution on pragmatism in political philosophy and continued to promote discussion and debate long after its publication.

== Background ==
The Public and Its Problems was Dewey's first major work concerned exclusively with political philosophy, though he had both commented and written on politics frequently for much of his career, and made forays into the subject as it related to education in Democracy and Education in 1916, and would go on to publish numerous works on the subject, including Individualism: Old and New (1930) and Liberalism and Social Action (1935) and Freedom and Culture (1939). Dewey was an ardent democrat who while still at university in 1888 had contended "Democracy and the one, ultimate, ethical ideal of humanity are to my mind synonymous."

Dewey was moved to write in defence of democracy in the wake of two widely read and influential works written by journalist Walter Lippmann in the 1920s which echoed a rising intellectual trend both in the United States and Europe that was critical of the potential for self-governing democratic societies. In the first, Public Opinion (1922), Lippmann contends that public opinion suffers from two major problems – that regular citizens have insufficient access to or interest in the facts of their environment, and that what information they receive is heavily distorted by cognitive biases, manipulation by the media, inadequate expertise and cultural norms. Lippmann contends that citizens construct a pseudo-environment that is a subjective, biased, and necessarily abridged mental image of the world, and to a degree, everyone's pseudo-environment is a fiction. Subsequently, because of the near impossibility of developing an adequately informed public that a democracy requires to make effective public policy in a world of increasingly complex policy problems, Lippmann contends that a technocratic elite is better placed to work for the public interest without necessarily undermining the notion of consent of the governed. Lippmann expanded upon his critiques of democracy and the public as an illusory and often dangerous force in The Phantom Public (1925), contending famously that "the public must be put in its place...so that each of us may live free of the trampling and the roar of a bewildered herd." He dismisses the notion of the existence of "the public" as used in democratic theory, and advances again a notion that elites are the only force capable of effectively achieving something akin to the 'public interest' in practice.

Dewey saw Lippmann's work as "perhaps the most effective indictment of democracy as currently conceived ever penned" but felt compelled to come to the defence of democratic theory and to reject what he saw as argumentation on the part of Lippmann that was particularly doctrinaire and absolutist in its judgements, and saw his own philosophical pragmatism as a means by which a more accurate and realistic conception of what the public and democracy was capable of it, and its limitations.

The spirit of Lippmann's critique of democracy was not new to Dewey. One of his first essays, "The Ethics of Democracy," was a response to the jurist and historian Sir Henry Maine, whose Popular Government anticipated many of Lippmann's critique. Written in 1888 at the age of twenty-nine, "The Ethics of Democracy" was Dewey's first defence of democracy, one that can be read as a direct predecessor of The Public and Its Problems.

== Overview ==
=== Part I: Origins of the Public, Society, and "The State" ===
Dewey opens with a critique of abstract accounts of the state’s origins — be it the Aristotelian idea that man is a political animal or social contract theories – which, he argues, devolve into "mythology" and "story-telling." Instead, Dewey thinks of the state as a way to respond to human actions and their consequences: “We take our point of departure from the objective fact that human actions have consequences upon others, that some of these consequences are perceived, and that their perception leads to subsequent effort to control action so as to secure some consequences and avoid others.” Certain actions merely affect the parties involved in a specific exchange, transaction, or arrangement; but others affect people with no direct involvement in the action itself. For Dewey, this distinction between direct and indirect consequences underpins the public-private distinction: “The public consists of all those who are affected by the indirect consequences of transactions to such an extent that it is deemed necessary to have those consequences systematically cared for.” There, Dewey argues, lies the nature and office of the state. The res publica, or commonwealth, is the aggregation of the funds, buildings, and institutions required to manage the consequences of actions that affect the public at large.

Dewey criticizes aggregative theorists who believe that there exists a collective, impersonal “public will.” As he puts it, “when the public or state is involved in making social arrangements like passing laws, enforcing a contract, conferring a franchise, it still acts through concrete persons.” In this sense, the relevant difference is not between individual wills and what Rousseau calls the "general will," but between actions performed as private citizens, and actions performed in positions of public authority. Any viable theory of the state needs to proceed from the realization that individual actions – done in positions of authority – are required to counterbalance other individual actions – done in private, but with indirect consequences on the public. These individual actions can only be understood in their socio-cultural context. Theorists must neither forget that the state is an aggregation of concrete persons doing concrete things, nor claim that individual actions are independent from one another. As Dewey puts it, "singular things act, but they act together." In particular, political actions necessarily carry a collective dimension, for they are analysed in terms of the consequences upon the public (i.e. others). Going further, Dewey argues that the content of our thoughts and actions is shaped by our associations – political or otherwise. In a well-known passage, he writes:

“While singular beings in their singularity think, want and decide, what they think and strive for, the content of their beliefs and intentions is a subject-matter provided by association. Thus man is not merely de facto associated, but he becomes a social animal in the make-up of his ideas, sentiments and deliberate behavior. What he believes, hopes for and aims at is the outcome of association and intercourse.”

For Dewey, political associations can be judged according to two distinct criteria: the degree to which the public is organized as an efficient means of collective action, and the degree to which the state — which regulates public affairs — is constituted in a way that serves the interests of the public itself. In this sense, the state as an organization “is equivalent to the equipment of the public with official representatives to care for the interests of the public.”

Dewey accepts that the public-private distinction has evolved over time. For instance, he cites the transition from England’s feudal order, in which local lords imposed private forms of justice upon the public, to the establishment of the state’s monopoly of justice, which transferred the judiciary power to distinctly public courts. Similarly, Dewey notes the gradual relegation of religion, once a matter of public concern, to the private sphere. No matter where the line between public and private is drawn, however, Dewey concludes that “the only constant is the function of caring for and regulating the interests which accrue as the result of the complex indirect expansion and radiation of conjoint behaviour." In other words, the increasing scale and complexity of human associations creates a need to coordinate widely distributed indirect consequences, a need that the state is to address.

Dewey provides a wide array of criteria to determine whether consequences should be of sufficient importance to concern the state. First are consequences that are far-reaching in time or space — e.g. harmful cultural or economic practices that harm a specific group on a large scale. Second are consequences that affect the most vulnerable (e.g. children). Third are consequences that are recurrent, repeated, systematic, or ingrained in people’s habits. Focusing on the third kind of consequence — which can and does overlap with the first two — allows the state to focus on patterns of behaviour that shape society at large. Nevertheless, Dewey argues that the state’s regulatory focus on the recurrent and the habitual creates an implicit status quo bias. By organizing itself to regulate the indirect consequences of human behaviour, the state relies upon a set of institutions, formal and informal, that are reluctant to accept fundamental change. For Dewey, innovations will thus never come from the state itself: “The most we can ask of the state, judging from states which have so far existed, is that it put up with their production by private individuals without undue meddling.”

=== Part II: Democratic Needs and the Public ===
For Dewey, whether elected in a democracy or not, the state’s officers claim to represent the public. But they remain individuals with their own private interests — many of which are tied to their class, family, and so on. In this sense, the only difference between a “representative” government and other types of government is that the public is organized to secure its own dominance over private interests. Most rulers in history obtained their power ipso facto, by accident or conquest, on the basis of largely arbitrary factors such as military ability, age, or lineage. In non-democratic systems, after the establishment of power-structures, “custom consolidates what accident has originated” and “established power legitimizes itself." In this sense, democracy marks an exception in the course of human events, for its distinctively political character lies in the way in which it selects its public officials, as well as the way it keeps them in check.

Dewey argues that the origins of democracy have little to do with democratic ideals and theories, and much to do with a series of “religious, scientific and economic changes” that reshaped politics. The development of science accompanied the decline of ecclesiastical authority as the rise of mercantilism externalized the power of the nobility to an ascending class of bourgeois merchants. Dewey argues that while ideals such as freedom presented themselves as ends to be attained for their own sake, early-democratic theories rationalized a strictly negative desire to do away with crumbling institutions. From these trends emerged a general distrust of authority, a fear of government and a desire to elevate individual autonomy. For Dewey, this desire to escape from deficient forms of association was manifest in all areas of life. From Descartes’s theory of knowledge to John Locke’s political philosophy, all appealed to the self as "the court of ultimate resort." This individualist ethos also served the rising world of commerce that Adam Smith defends in his Wealth of Nations, which places the individual and its desires at the centre of all economic transactions. For Dewey, where most pre-modern states made a mockery of the public-private distinction, liberal democracies fear the state and its encroachments upon the lives of individuals. Popular election of officials, short terms of office, frequent elections, all are attempts to restrict the scope and power of government. Elections align the interests of public officials as private citizens and the interests of the public at large; as for short terms, they allow the people to hold officeholders accountable on a regular basis.

Dewey argues that this individualistic ethos is neither necessary nor desirable for democracies to thrive. He recognizes that the convergence of individualism and democracy made sense in the 18th century, but argues that its premises were inaccurate then and now. First, Dewey criticizes the idea that there ever existed a pre-political state of nature, that we possess natural rights independently of human associations, and that we can ever exist without collective attachments. Second, he points to a shift that makes individualism even less appropriate now than it was in the 18th century. Then, Dewey argues, human beings had mostly "face-to-face" interactions that helped perpetuate the illusion that human associations operated between independent individuals. Now, our interactions have become more impersonal and indirect. Our economic and political lives are controlled by institutions which we cannot see, people whom we have never met, and forces beyond our control. Dewey writes that "the Great Society created by steam and electricity may be a society, but it is no community. The invasion of the community by the new and relatively impersonal and mechanical modes of combined human behavior is the outstanding fact of modern life."

For Dewey, the emancipatory desire that led to the rise of individualism destroyed communal bonds while liberating people from deficient institutions. In other words, the moderns discovered the individual by forgetting the community. But as modern life becomes more and more impersonal, the disappearance of a properly organized public and the artifice of individualism will continue to be on full display. Further, the displacement of the political by economic forces calls into question the extreme fear of the state that early-liberal democratic theorists embraced. While some expected the market to liberate people from oppression, Dewey argues, market-structures have created their own problems – as he puts it, "the same forces which have brought about the forms of democratic government, general suffrage, executives and legislators chosen by majority vote, have also brought about conditions which halt the social and humane ideals that demand the utilization of government as the genuine instrumentality of an inclusive and fraternally associated public."

More specifically, Dewey focuses upon the fact that the democratic public remains unorganized. Analysing the evolution of democracy in America, Dewey laments the abandonment of the localism that characterized early-American townships. Then, American democracy articulated itself around communal life on a small scale. Neighbourly sociability facilitated the formation of an organized public, which assembled at regular township meetings. People knew one another, knew their leaders, and knew the immediate issues facing the town.

The problem, Dewey continues, is that while America's foundations were resolutely localist, its present administration is not. Politically and otherwise, America has become a nation-state whose institutions are patched together in an ad hoc way. Where Plato and Rousseau believed that states could not exist on a large-scale, modern technologies – railway networks, interdependence, newspapers, telegraphs, etc. — have made personal acquaintance irrelevant in the political process. For Dewey, institutions have struggled to keep up with this gradual centralization that industrial transformations both enabled and required. Centralization created social and intellectual uniformity, both of which, Dewey argue, breed mediocrity. The centralization of information-gathering and narrative-setting has also regimented public opinion, which finds itself shaped by a series of newspapers and external influences. The administrative state has grown, as has the power and influence of large-scale businesses. In all these respects, the public as a coherent unit has been fragmented, eclipsed, and lost. Dewey considers the fact that fewer and fewer people exercise their right to vote deeply symbolic – for this abdication mirrors the disappearance of the public as a community that controls democratic life. As Dewey puts it, "the machine age has so enormously expanded, multiplied, intensified and complicated the scope of the indirect consequences, have formed such immense and consolidated unions in action, on an impersonal rather than a community basis, that the resultant public cannot identify and distinguish itself."

Dewey links the two phenomena by arguing that a public is only capable of organizing itself when the consequences of indirect actions are clearly perceived, and when the causes of indirect actions are clearly identifiable. But in a world of ever-increasing complexity and opacity, indirect consequences are felt rather than perceived, their causes are obscure, and the public thus remains amorphous. Worse still, Dewey argues, instead of questioning the abandonment of localism and the disappearance of an organized public, theorists focus upon the need for non-democratic experts. While Dewey appreciates the need for experts in modern societies, he rejects the idea that technocracy is the panacea for modern ills. For Dewey, the fact of mass-depoliticization is not an inescapable result of modern industrial life, but a choice that can be altered.

=== Part III: Democracy Depends on Education, Effective Communication, and Decentralized Localism ===
Dewey seeks to re-organize the public by linking democracy as a system of government — that is, as a way to choose leaders and organize institutions — and democracy as a way of life. As Dewey puts it, “the idea of democracy is a wider and fuller idea than can be exemplified in the state even at its best; to be realized it must affect all modes of human association, the family, the school, industry, religion." In other words, democracy must shape the lives of people, educate them as citizens, and make them play an integral role in the political process. Rejecting conventional forms of large-scale representative democracy, Dewey advocates smaller-scale, participatory models in which citizens and communities shape every political process.

For Dewey, the main difficulty lies in the reconstitution of a public that is a meaningful community — as opposed to a scattered set of atomized individuals. To do so, he claims, democracy must become community life itself, that is, it must become a communal attachment that is as significant to people as their family or their faith. To reinstate this sense of community is to establish what Dewey calls “the clear consciousness of a communal life.” Where modern life abstracts politics away, Dewey defends the development of a real sense of fraternity, without which none of the benefits of democracy can be achieved. For him, true democracies must convert organic and disorganized forms of associative behaviour into real communities of action united by common symbols, concerns, interests, and problems.

Dewey then lists two requirements for this new form of democracy to emerge. First is the universalization of the kind of education that equips citizens with the ability to participate in political affairs. Where Walter Lippmann dismissed the idea of the “omnicompetent individual” as a fiction perpetuated by naïve theorists, Dewey argues that it is both possible and necessary to cultivate faculties of effectual observation and reflection in everyone. Such are habits, cultural norms, and values around which democratic institutions — within and beyond the state — should organize themselves. As Dewey puts it, “habit is the mainspring of human action, and habits are formed for the most part under the influence of the customs of a group.” Just as the status quo cultivates short attention-lifespans, insatiability, and depoliticization, Dewey believes that we can cultivate the necessary qualities of democratic life. Dewey does not neglect the role of expertise and science; nor does he claim that ordinary citizens will ever be able to understand complex scientific questions as well as experts. But he does claim that the public can be educated enough to understand the indirect consequences that scientists are trying to address — to an extent that is sufficient for expertise not to become a barrier to true democracy.

Dewey’s second requirement for democracy as a way of life is the proper dissemination of information. He criticizes conformism and censorship, thereby arguing that the circulation of facts and ideas should be facilitated. Dewey claims that censorship and conformism tend to be weaponized by those in power, which makes intellectual innovation necessary for democratic equality to persist. He then argues that the eclipse of interdisciplinary work in academia, as well as the centralization of information-gathering in journalism, have both negatively impacted democratic norms — Dewey proposes to reverse both these trends. More broadly, all of Dewey’s proposals seek to make genuine communication of facts and ideas possible. As he puts it, “communication of the results of social inquiry is the same thing as the formation of public opinion.” In other words, by facilitating the dissemination of facts and ideas, democracies encourage the organization of the public into a coherent political force.

Dewey’s third requirement is some degree of localism. As aforementioned, Dewey laments the end of face-to-face interactions, which allowed communal bonds to form more easily. While Dewey does not advocate the fragmentation of the nation-state, he does insist upon the importance of local associations. Since local interactions are most direct, they shape human beings in important ways, and often serve as a blueprint for large-scale associations. In this sense, the revitalization of the public as a cohesive entity will necessarily start at the local level.

All these proposals serve a single goal: To turn the apathy of the “Great Society" (not to be confused with the Lyndon Johnson policy program of the same name) into a meaningful "Great Community.”

== Reception and influence ==
The main innovation of The Public and Its Problems is to present a vision of democracy not merely as a tool of political legitimacy or as a way to organize political systems, but as a way of life and an ethos. By affirming that democracies ought to cultivate certain virtues and habits in the citizenry, Dewey seems to be proposing a more illiberal conception of democracy than that of classical liberal theorists – in that Dewey's conception of democracy blurs the public-private distinction by requiring the development of democratic habits. As Melvin L. Rogers puts it, "Dewey is critical of the extent to which classical liberalism, with its atomistic psychology, narrow understanding of individuality, and limited role for the state, undermines the communal dimension of democracy." Siding with the likes of L. T. Hobhouse and W. E. B. Du Bois, Dewey stands ready to combat economic deprivations and political exclusions by restricting individual autonomy. In this sense, Dewey belongs to what L. T. Hobhouse calls "new liberalism." Where classical liberals separate the individual sphere of action from the public sphere at large, new liberals try to find the right balance between the two. Like Hobhouse, Dewey retains the classical liberal aspiration to emancipate individuals and free their potential. Unlike most classical liberals, however, Dewey does not bracket the question of the good life to build political institutions. He takes the flourishing of life to require certain pre-conditions, and seeks to use the state to ensure that these pre-conditions are met. The Public and Its Problems follows this approach by defending the cultivation of a participatory, democratic ethos in all spheres of life.

Whether Dewey's communitarian bent makes his conception of democracy incompatible with liberalism is a matter of scholarly debate. On the one hand, Dewey belongs to a pluralist tradition that views the individual as the intersecting fusion of diverse social groups and overlapping associations – including the state itself. In this sense, Dewey's liberalism follows the likes of Arthur Bentley, Ernest Barker and Mary Parker Follett. On the other hand, by arguing that proper democracy requires the cultivation of certain personal qualities in all spheres of life, Dewey departs from the kind of liberal neutrality that some associate with John Rawls. Robert B. Talisse, for instance, argues that Dewey's conception of democracy as a way of life is incompatible with genuine pluralism. Talisse claims that Dewey's conception of democracy imposes a specific vision of good onto others, thereby relinquishing the pluralist aspirations of liberalism. Joshua Forstenzer has replied to Talisse's objection by holding that Deweyan democracy relies upon only a "thin" definition of the good – as opposed to a robust, comprehensive doctrine. For Forstenzer, no political system can ever be neutral vis-à-vis substantive definitions of the good; on his view, Deweyan democracy may invite the cultivation of certain democratic virtues, but it remains sufficiently broad for people of diverse backgrounds, faiths, and cultural traditions to live according to their own principles — to a large extent at least. Similarly, Shane J. Ralston argues that Deweyan democracy and pluralism are entirely compatible. More specifically, Ralston claims that Dewey offers a set of pluralist procedures that allow democracy as a way of life to include a robust respect of value-diversity, illustrating her argument with a real-life case studies.

More broadly, The Public and Its Problems has been put in dialogue with a variety of historical and contemporary political theorists. In his pluralist critique of Dewey, Talisse compares Dewey's communitarian bent with Michael Sandel's civic republicanism, later mobilising Rawls and Isaiah Berlin to argue against both. Both Melvin L. Rogers and Shane J. Ralston claim that the second and third chapters of The Public and Its Problems flirt with both deliberative and participatory conceptions of democracy. For Rogers, Dewey ties the very idea of representation to deliberation among the citizenry, a connection that contemporary theorists of deliberation à la Hélène Landemore also defend. Lastly, Naoko Saito has put Dewey in dialogue with Henry David Thoreau and Stanley Cavell to compare their competing conceptions of democracy as a way of life.
