= Ève Curie =

French–American journalist and pianist (1904–2007)

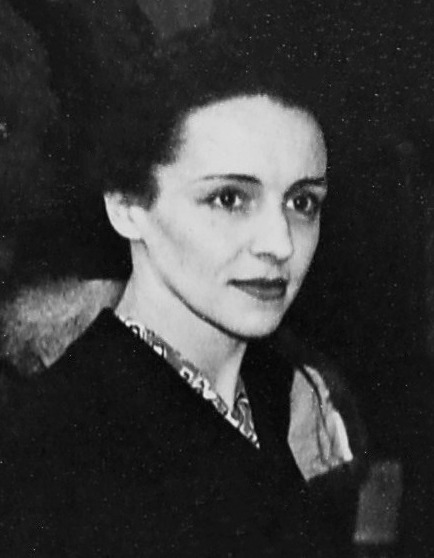
- Curie in 1937
- Born: Ève Denise Curie; December 6, 1904; Paris, France
- Died: October 22, 2007 (aged 102); New York City, U.S.
- Resting place: Metairie Cemetery; New Orleans, Louisiana, U.S.
- Citizenship: France (1904–2007); United States (1958–2007)
- Education: Collège Sévigné
- Occupations: Journalist, pianist
- Spouse: Henry Richardson Labouisse Jr. (m. 1954; died 1987)
- Relatives: Marie Curie (mother); Pierre Curie (father); Irène Joliot-Curie (sister)
- Writing career
- Notable works: Madame Curie (1937); Journey Among Warriors (1943)
- Notable awards: National Book Award (1937); Croix de guerre Légion d'Honneur (2005)

Ève Denise Curie Labouisse (French pronunciation: [ɛv dəniz kyʁi labwis]; December 6, 1904 – October 22, 2007) was a French and American writer, journalist and pianist. Ève Curie was the younger daughter of Marie Curie and Pierre Curie. Her sister was Irène Joliot-Curie and her brother-in-law was Frédéric Joliot-Curie. She worked as a journalist and authored her mother's biography Madame Curie and a book of war reportage, Journey Among Warriors. From the 1960s she committed herself to work for UNICEF, providing help to children and mothers in developing countries. Ève was the only member of her family who did not choose a career as a scientist and did not win a Nobel Prize, although her husband, Henry Richardson Labouisse Jr., did collect the Nobel Peace Prize in 1965 on behalf of UNICEF, completing the Curie family legacy of five Nobel Prize winners.

== Childhood ==
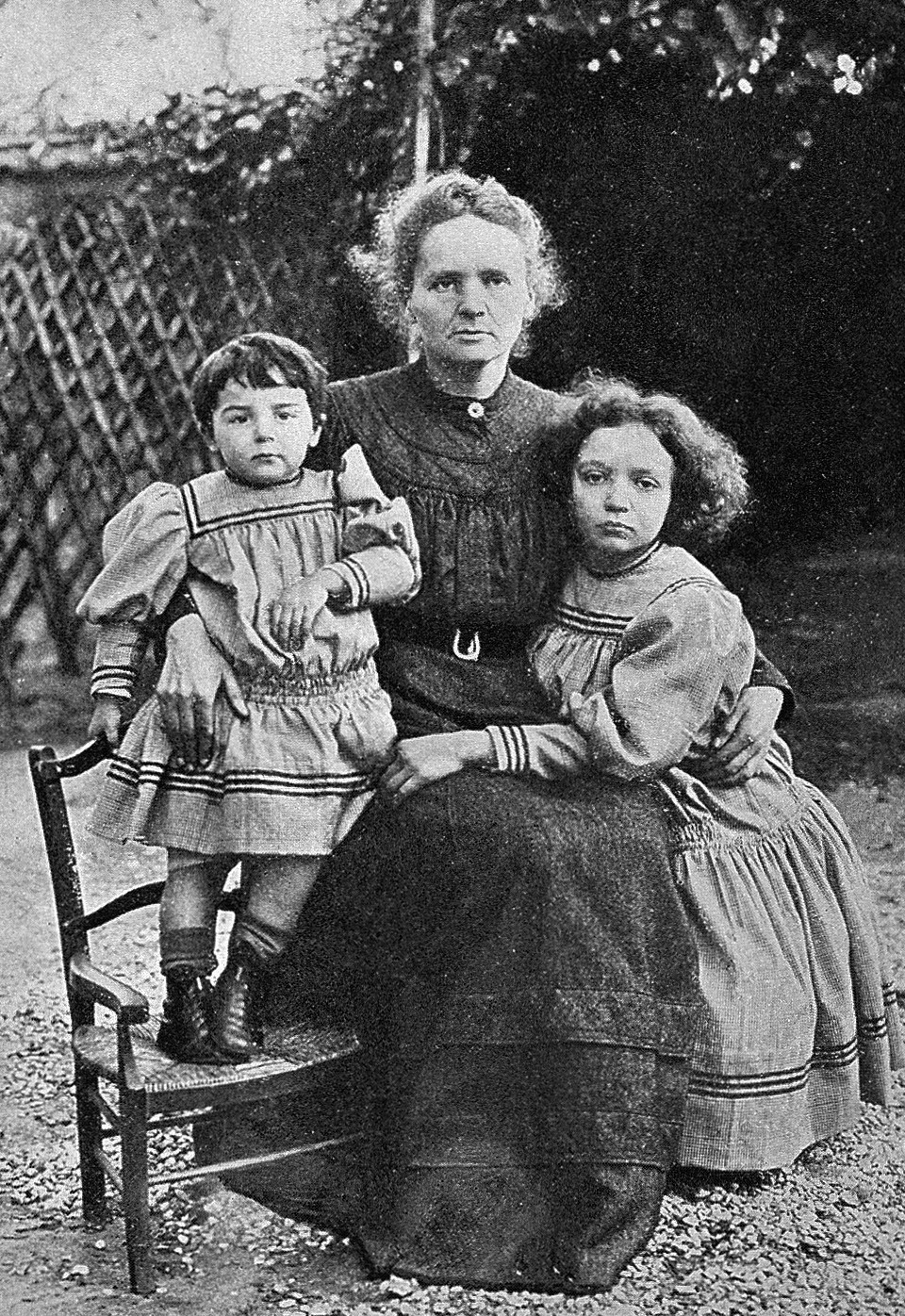
Ève, Marie, and Irène Curie in 1908

Ève Denise Curie was born in Paris, France, on December 6, 1904. She was the younger daughter of the scientists Marie and Pierre Curie, who also had another daughter Irène (born 1897). Ève did not know her father, who died in 1906 in an accident, run over by a horse cart. After this accident, Marie Curie accepted her husband's teaching position at La Sorbonne. Her father-in-law, Dr. Eugène Curie, moved in with the family when his wife died, and he took care of the children while Pierre and Marie, and then Marie only, went to work. When he died in 1910, Marie Curie remained alone to bring up her daughters with the help of governesses. Ève later said that as a child she had suffered from a lack of sufficient attention of her mother and only later, in her teens, she developed a stronger emotional bond with her. Marie took great care for the education and development of interests of both her daughters. Irène followed in her mother's footsteps and became an eminent scientist (she was awarded the Nobel Prize in Chemistry with her husband Frédéric Joliot-Curie in 1935), while Ève showed more artistic and literary interests. Even as a child she displayed a particular talent for music.

Whatever the weather, they went on long walks and rode on bikes. They went swimming in summer, and Marie had gymnastics equipment installed in the garden of their house in Sceaux, Hauts-de-Seine. Ève and Irène also learned sewing, gardening and cooking.

Although the girls were French nationals (Ève later became an American citizen), and their first language was French, they were familiar with their Polish origins and spoke Polish. In 1911 they visited Poland (the southern part, which was then under Austrian rule). During this visit, they rode horses and hiked in the mountains.

== Youth ==
In 1921, Ève set off on her first journey across the Atlantic Ocean: that spring, she sailed with her sister and mother on board the ship RMS Olympic to New York City. Marie Curie, as a two-time laureate of the Nobel Prize, the discoverer of radium and polonium, was welcomed there with all due ceremony; her daughters were also very popular with American high society. Radiant at parties and joyous, Ève was dubbed by the press "the girl with radium eyes". During the trip Ève and Irène also acted as their mother's "bodyguards" – Marie, usually focused on research work and preferring a simple life, did not always feel comfortable facing the homage paid to her. While in the United States, Marie, Irène and Ève met President Warren G. Harding in Washington, D.C., saw Niagara Falls and went by train to see the Grand Canyon. They returned to Paris in June 1921.

Ève, like her sister Irène, graduated from the Collège Sévigné, a non denominational private high school in Paris, where she obtained her baccalaureate in 1925. Meanwhile, she also improved her piano skills and gave her first concert in Paris in 1925. Later, she performed on stage many times, giving concerts in the French capital, in the provinces and in Belgium.

After Irène married Frédéric Joliot in 1926, Ève stayed with her mother in Paris, taking care of her and accompanying her on trips throughout France, Italy, Belgium, and Switzerland. In 1932, they also accompanied the President of Czechoslovakia, Tomáš Masaryk, on his trip to Spain.

Although she loved her mother, Ève had a quite different personality from her (and from her sister Irène). She was not interested in science, preferring the humanities. Unlike her mother, she was always attracted by refined life. Whereas Marie usually wore simple, black dresses, Ève cared about smart clothes, wore high-heeled shoes and make-up, and loved shining at parties. However, both Ève and Irène nursed their mother with devotion until her death. Marie, ill with aplastic anemia, probably caused by her long-term exposure to ionizing radiation, died on July 4, 1934.

== After mother's death ==
After Marie Curie's death, Ève wrote a biography about her mother. She temporarily withdrew from social life and moved to a small flat in Auteuil, Yvelines, where she gathered and sorted documents and letters. In autumn 1935, she visited her family in Poland, looking for information about her mother's childhood and youth. The biography, Madame Curie, was simultaneously published in France, Britain, Italy, Spain, the United States and other countries in 1937.

Madame Curie was instantly popular and became a bestseller in many countries including the United States. In the U.S. it won the third annual National Book Award for Non-Fiction (Note: After two U.S. National Book Award cycles, the Non-fiction and Biography categories were combined beginning 1937.) voted by the American Booksellers Association. There was a film adaptation in 1943 by Metro-Goldwyn-Mayer, with Greer Garson in the title role.

Ève became more engaged in literary and journalistic work. Apart from her mother's biography, she published musical reviews in the Candide weekly and articles on theater, music, and film in other Paris newspapers.

== Second World War ==
After the outbreak of the Second World War in 1939, the novelist and playwright Jean Giraudoux, who had become the French Information Commissioner (Commissaire général à l'information) in the same year, appointed Ève Curie head of the feminine division in his office. After Germany invaded France, Ève left Paris on June 11, 1940, and after the surrender of France, fled with other refugees to England on board an overcrowded ship, which was strafed by German aircraft. There she joined the Free French Forces of General Charles de Gaulle and started her active fight against Nazism, which resulted in the Vichy government's depriving her of French nationality and confiscating her property in 1941.

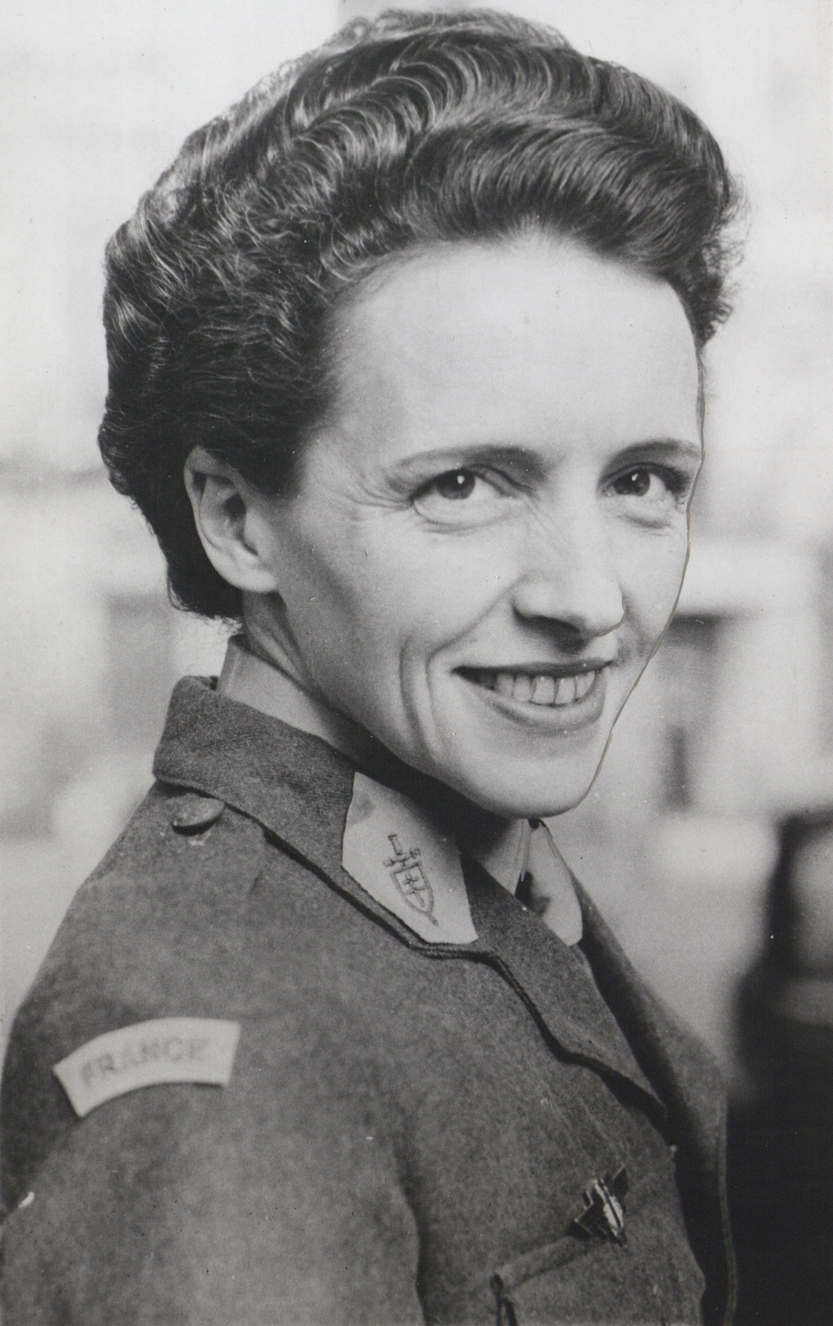
Ève Curie in a private's uniform, 1943

Ève Curie spent most of the war years in Britain, where she met Winston Churchill, and the United States, where she gave lectures and wrote articles to American newspapers (mostly the New York Herald Tribune). In 1940 she met Eleanor Roosevelt at the White House. Inspired by this visit, she later gave a series of lectures on "French Women and the War"; in May 1940 The Atlantic Monthly published her essay under the same title.

From November 1941 to April 1942, Ève Curie traveled as a war correspondent to Africa, the Soviet Union and Asia, where she witnessed the British offensive in Egypt and Libya in December 1941 and the Soviet counter-offensive at Moscow in January 1942. During this journey she met the Shah of Iran, Mohammad Reza Pahlavi, the leader of Free China, Chiang Kai-shek, fighting the Japanese, and Mahatma Gandhi. Several times she had the opportunity to meet her half-compatriots, Polish soldiers, who fought on the side of the British or organized the Polish Army in the Soviet Union.

Curie's reports from this journey were published in American newspapers, and in 1943 they were gathered in the book Journey Among Warriors, which was nominated for the Pulitzer Prize for Correspondence in 1944 (eventually losing to Ernie Pyle). An article in the autumn 1943 issue of The Russian Review critiqued Curie's book. The reviewer, Michael Karpovich, complimented her enthusiastic and sympathetic style of writing about people she met and interviewed in the Soviet Union. However, Karpovich felt that Curie did not characterize believably the Russians she described. In Journey Among Warriors she wrote about her conversations with a Greek Orthodox bishop, a noted ballerina, a Red Army general, factory workers, local communist leaders, and scientists. Karpovich thought that Curie's exuberance distorted both her judgment and her vision for the book.

After her return to Europe, Ève Curie served as a volunteer in the women's medical corps of the Free French during the Italian Campaign, where she was promoted to the rank of lieutenant in the French 1st Armored Division. In August 1944 she took part in landing with her troops in Provence in southern France. She was decorated with the Croix de guerre for her services.

== After the war ==
After the liberation of France, Ève Curie first worked as a co-editor of the daily newspaper Paris-Presse from 1944 to 1949, but was also active in the political sphere. For example, she was responsible for women's affairs in de Gaulle's government, and in 1948 along with other prominent European intellectuals, she appealed to the United Nations for recognition of the state of Israel. In the years 1952–1954, she was a special advisor to Hastings Lionel Ismay, the first Secretary General of NATO. On 19 November 1954 she married the American politician and diplomat Henry Richardson Labouisse Jr., who served as the United States Ambassador to Greece from 1962 to 1965. Ève Curie became an American citizen in 1958.

== Work for UNICEF ==
In 1965, Ève's husband gave up his job in the U.S. government when the Secretary General of the United Nations U Thant offered him the position of the executive director of the United Nations Children's Fund UNICEF. Labouisse held this office until 1979, actively supported by his wife, who also worked for the organization and was often called "the First Lady of UNICEF". Together, they visited more than 100 countries, mostly in the Third World, which were beneficiaries of UNICEF's help. In 1965, Labouisse, accompanied by his wife, accepted the Nobel Peace Prize, which was awarded to his organization.

== Last years of life ==
After her husband's death in 1987, Ève lived in New York City. She had no children from her marriage to Henry Labouisse, but she had a stepdaughter, Anne Peretz from Labouisse's first marriage. Anne Peretz's children considered her their grandmother, and their children considered her their great-grandmother.

In December 2004, Ève Curie celebrated her one-hundredth birthday. On this occasion, she was visited in her New York flat by the Secretary General of the United Nations Kofi Annan. She also received congratulatory letters from the Presidents of the United States – George W. Bush – and France – Jacques Chirac.

In July 2005, Ève Curie Labouisse was promoted for her work in UNICEF to the rank of 'Officier de la Légion d'Honneur' of the Republic of France – the country's highest decoration. She expressed thanks for the decoration, saying:

I feel honoured, I feel proud. I'm a little embarrassed because I don't think I deserve all those wonderful compliments, so I just don't quite know how to behave. But it's a really wonderful day for me and I will remember it for a very long time.

She sometimes joked that she brought shame on her family, saying "There were five Nobel Prizes in my family, two for my mother, one for my father, one for [my] sister and brother-in-law and one for my husband. Only I was not successful ...".

Ève Curie died in her sleep on 22 October 2007 in her residence on Sutton Place in Manhattan. She was 102 years old. Ann Veneman, the executive director of UNICEF, said after her death:

Mrs. Labouisse was a talented professional woman who used her many skills to promote peace and development. While her husband headed UNICEF, she played a very active role in the organization, traveling with him to advocate for children and to provide support and encouragement to UNICEF staff in remote and difficult locations. Her energy and her commitment to the betterment of the world should serve as an inspiration to us all.

She and her husband are buried at Metairie Cemetery in his native New Orleans.
