= Ronald Steel =

American historian (1931–2023)

- Born: Ronald Lewis Sklut; March 25, 1931; Morris, Illinois, U.S.
- Died: May 7, 2023 (aged 92); Washington, D.C., U.S.
- Education: Northwestern University (BA); Harvard University (MA)
- Occupations: Author, journalist, historian, professor
- Writing career
- Years active: 1959–2008
- Subjects: American history; foreign policy

Ronald Lewis Steel (né Sklut; March 25, 1931 – May 7, 2023) was an American writer, historian, and professor. He is the author of the definitive biography of Walter Lippmann. (Note: Walter Lippmann won the 1982 award for paperback "Autobiography/Biography". From 1980 to 1983 in National Book Award history there were dual hardcover and paperback awards in most categories, and several nonfiction subcategories including General Nonfiction. Most of the paperback award-winners were reprints, including this one.)

== Early life ==
Ronald Lewis Sklut was born on March 25, 1931, in Morris, Illinois, outside of Chicago. He was Jewish and his father immigrated to the United States from Russia.

Steel earned his Bachelor of Arts degree in Political Science and English from Northwestern University (1953) and a Master of Arts degree in political economy from Harvard University (1955). He served in the United States Army, stationed in Paris and was a diplomat in the United States Foreign Service, stationed in Hamburg.

== Career ==
Steel was an editor for the Scholastic Corporation from 1959 to 1962. By 1960, he had begun writing under the pen name Ronald Steel. After leaving Scholastic, he lived in Europe, working in Paris and London as a writer and translator.

Steel was the author of Walter Lippmann and the American Century, the definitive biography of Lippmann. For this book, he was awarded the 1980 National Book Critics Circle Award in General Nonfiction, a National Book Award, the Bancroft Prize, and the Los Angeles Times Book Prize for History. The book was also nominated for the Pulitzer Prize in Biography.

He was awarded a Guggenheim Fellowship in 1973.

Steel was a professor of International Relations, History, and Journalism at the University of Southern California, where he taught from 1986 to 2008. Before teaching at USC, he taught at Yale University, Rutgers University, Wellesley College, Dartmouth College, George Washington University, UCLA, and Princeton University.

Steel wrote for The New Republic in the 1980s. He has also written for the Atlantic Monthly, The New York Times and The New York Review of Books.

== Later life and death ==
In 2016, Steel moved to a nursing home in Washington, D.C., due to increasing cognitive impairment from dementia. He died there on May 7, 2023, at the age of 92.

== Works ==
- U.S. Foreign Trade Policy, 1962
- Italy, 1963
- The End of Alliance: America and the Future of Europe, 1964
- North Africa, 1967
- Pax Americana, 1967
- Imperialists and other Heroes: A chronicle of the American Empire, 1971
- Walter Lippmann and the American century, 1980
- Temptations of a Superpower, 1995
- In Love with Night: the American romance with Robert Kennedy, 2000
