= Transactionalism: An Historical and Interpretive Study =

1966 book by Trevor J. Phillips

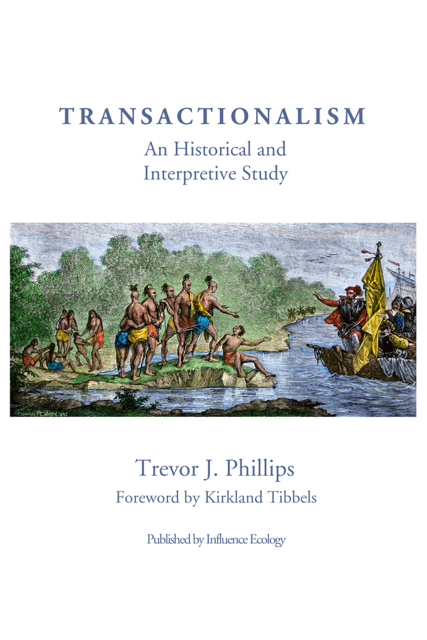
- First edition
- Editor: John Patterson and Kirkland Tibbels
- Author: Trevor J. Phillips
- Cover artist: North Wind Picture Archives
- Language: English
- Genre: Philosophy
- Publisher: Influence Ecology, LLC
- Publication date: 2013
- Publication place: United States
- Media type: image of Columbus's hospitable reception by Guacanagaríx, Caribbean chief, after shipwreck of Santa Maria, 1492. Hand-colored woodcut.
- Pages: 222 p.
- ISBN: 978-0-9904417-0-0
- LC Class: Control Number: 1-1006506061
- Website: www.transactionalism.com

Transactionalism: An Historical and Interpretive Study, was written in 1966 by philosopher Trevor J. Phillips (1927–2016) and first published in December 2013. At the time of its publication, it was the first, most comprehensive account of the origins and evolution of the modern historical, philosophical, psychological, and educational philosophy known as transactionalism.

== About the philosophy ==
Transactionalism is about the mutual transactions that make up our human condition. It is about the co-constitutive, reciprocal acts required to satisfy various unavoidable conditions of life. The philosophy of transactionalism appears across a wide range of disciplines from anthropology to zoology. Though "transactionalism" never appears in the works of educational philosopher, pragmatist, and psychologist John Dewey, Phillips documents his conceptualization of "transactions," which stems primarily from his work and collaboration with political philosopher Arthur Bentley in the 1949 book Knowing and the Known. "Dewey and Bentley don’t use or define ‘transactionalism’ explicitly in their work. Dewey was, as is illustrated in my thesis, against the use of such things as -isms."

"Transactionalism" was first used by Norwegian-born social anthropologist Frederick Barth. He never claims to originate the term or concept, but his definition is useful: "[M]ost of our basic relationships, all of our basic relationships, are social relations that are built around mutual transactions" built upon the "biological constraints of ecology" and understood within a context of economics and politics. Transactionalism is exemplified in Barth's ethnographic observations of the Swat Pathans in Pakistan.

== About the publication ==
Published by the founders of a learning ecology steeped in the philosophy of transactionalism and training others in transactional competence, the book Transactionalism: An Historical and Interpretive Study re-presents the 1966 dissertation of educational philosopher Trevor J. Phillips (1927–2016). Using its original title, the entirety of the text is as it originally appeared (with a few minor edits) in 222 pages. Without any pictures or figures, the prose is dense and not an easy read, but its rich explications are valuable in understanding how human beings tend towards complicating our condition through the persistent liability of our dualistic thinking.

After completing his dissertation in 1966, Phillips joined the U.S. professoriate and ended his career as a professor emeritus in educational foundations and inquiry at Bowling Green State University from 1963 to 1996. His dissertation was retrieved by the founders of Influence Ecology and published as a hardbound text in 2013.

== Summary of the contents ==
There are five main chapters followed by the author's biography and a bibliography of books and articles referenced in the book.

Chapter I is an introduction to the pragmatic philosophy of transactionalism. Chapter 2 traces its historical roots. Chapter 3 outlines its evolution in contemporary philosophy. Chapter 4 discusses how transactionalism took its forms in contemporary psychology. Finally, Chapter 5 examines its place in the educative process given its formulations in philosophy and psychology before the 1970s. Overall, the book traces the philosophical roots of transactionalism through various well-known figures including Polybius, Galileo, and Newton; it frames an understanding of transactionalism through field theory, Darwinism, theories of inquiry, truth, and symbols, as well as the pragmatism of William James and the sociological theory of George Herbert Mead, to name a few. Phillips demonstrates and justifies the need for transactionalism as an educational philosophy that was initially shaped and charted by John Dewey in collaboration with Arthur F. Bentley.

The following provides a broad sense of each chapter's content.

=== Chapter I: Introduction ===
The philosophical roots of transactionalism, from Greek historians Polybius and Plato to 7th century polymath and architect of the scientific revolution Galileo, are explicated in this chapter. "The schools of transactional philosophy and psychology represent a relatively new approach to the ancient and perennial problems of perceiving and knowing," writes Phillips in the introduction. He adds that the current thinking at the time of his writing was one that denied the uniqueness and human dignity of all people. Society was facing the strife of resistance to the U.S. civil rights movement and anti-war protests in the late 1960s. The introduction was designed to provide a historical perspective on the philosophical roots of a transactional approach to a complex way of life that demands on-going inquiry and examination to fulfill our basic and complex needs.

=== Chapter II: Transactionalism Viewed Historically ===
The book Knowing and the Known by philosophers John Dewey and Arthur Bentley (1949) is recognized as a critical source in defining the concept that is the basis of transactionalism. The term "trans-action" appears repeatedly throughout the text in ways distinct from its uses in economics as a representation of exchange or value in an economy. In this early chapter of his dissertation, which appears in its original form in this historical and interpretive book, educational philosopher Trevor Phillips distinguishes viewing a transaction not as a form of economic exchange but rather as a way to invite human beings to inquiry into situations for which we presume ourselves as divisible separates. If a human is an organism-environment, then she/he is only an aspect of situations known as "borrowing-lending, buying-selling, writing-reading, parent-child, and husband-wife."

Borrowing, for example, is an aspect of the borrowing-lending transaction, and cannot, without serious distortion, be regarded as an independent element. That is to say, one cannot “borrow” except with the help of a “loan.” The term is not strictly a modern creation.

This chapter explores the historical roots and foundations of the philosophy initially discovered in the writings of the Greek historian Polybius by British historian and philosopher of history Arnold J. Toynbee. Toynbee believed that Polybius's references to "transaction" with regards to the history of the Roman conquest parallel the meaning intended by Dewey and Bentley. Transactionalism is a focus on the "why" and "how" as well as the reasoning for any given action whether it be conquest or merely requesting a loan. Transactions of any kind "ought to concentrate attention less upon the bald narrative of transactions than upon the antecedents, concomitants and consequences of any give action". This chapter outlines a historical lineage of thinkers whose work lays the foundation for transactional thought and competence as a way of living life. The findings of Polybius, and perhaps most importantly Galileo, as well as Aristotle and Isaac Newton, are considered as historical antecedents. More modern contributions are discussed from the contemporary use of the term "transaction" in a non-economic context by physicist J. Clerk Maxwell. Field theory, referencing the work of physicists Albert Einstein and Leopold Infeld in The Evolution of Physics, is also discussed as a modern precursor of transactionalism philosophy.

=== Chapter III: Transactionalism In Contemporary Philosophy ===
From birth to death every human being is a Party, so that neither he nor anything done or suffered can possibly be understood when it is separated from the fact of participation in an extensive body of transactions.

Transactionalist philosophy was based on a foundational series of exchanges between John Dewey and Arthur Bentley beginning in 1932. Their exchange resulted in the 1949 book Knowing and the Known. Transactionalists believe that errors in perceiving what is (or is not) real stem from oversimplifications and bifurcations, or from categorizing things or what we know into dualities. Dualisms limit facts to "interaction" or "merely action-and-reaction," which does not encompass the transactional nature of life (not to be confused with an economic understanding of transaction). Transactionalists dismiss as inappropriate any inclination towards bifurcating knowledge leading to a need to discover the words, tenets, errors, and weaknesses in our thinking that may prevent us from any legitimate inquiry into knowing what is a "satisfying" versus "satisfactory" experience or transaction small or large. To meet our basic needs for survival, mankind must constantly inquire into the transactional nature of who we are as an ever-evolving organism in ever-evolving world of experience.

To experience is to transact; in point of fact, experience is a transaction of organism-environment....The happenings which affect individuals and the actions they consciously effect in response constitute the domain know[n] as experience.

By unpacking inherited meanings and accepted or assumed ways of knowing assigned through words like "fact" and "mind," transactionalists explicate how humans tend to privilege the signification of something over acting and doing something. Our access to understanding reality demands a comprehensive way of knowing and existing. Scholars supporting a transactionalist philosophical approach include William James, Charles Sanders Peirce, naturalist George Ellett Coghill, and sociologist George Herbert Mead.

Dualisms distance us from reality separating object and subject, the known and the knower. In transactionalism, "knowledge is dependent upon the autonomous existence of a knower on the one hand, and something to be known on the other," and any separation of the two leads away from reality. Thus, any inquiry into knowledge starts with the assumption that "man as the knower is a part of the world as it is known." Man as organism in both an external and skin-bounded environment can only exist in this assumed reality as man as organism-environment realizes the need to act together-at-once in her/his ecology. Any inner or outer knowing-ness happens as a result of transaction, of exchange and value that comes from experience.

Author Trevor Phillips also references independent approximations of transactionalism found in the research of atomic physicist Niels Bohr and biologist Ludwig von Bertalanffy, which substantiates the rejection of any dualism that segregates behavior and interaction as if they are separates rather than parts of a unified transactional system or whole. The chapter examines the resulting theory of knowledge and subsequent theories of inquiry, truth, and value designed to help mankind more reliably grasp the "knowings" and "existings" of a transactional world of experience.

The chapter closes with 10 tenets of transactional metaphysics including:

1. Rejecting any notion that there is an independent knower distinct from something to be known.
2. Knowledge must emerge from an actual inquiry into a unified experience of all the known and existing aspects of a transaction.
3. The perception of reality is an "unfractured observation" of a "knowing-known" taken as a unified process.
4. "Human behavior is a trans-dermal affair; intra-dermal and extra-dermal factors are to be viewed as aspects of the total behavioral event."
5. Given our tendency towards duality, "the fragmentation of experience is to be corrected on whatever level it may occur."

=== Chapter IV: Transactionalism In Contemporary Psychology ===
Building on the tenets of a transactional philosophy, this chapter describes "the situation that arises when transactional viewpoints and modes of inquiry are applied in the field of psychology. The resulting discipline, transactional psychology, is expected to have implications for educational practice" (p. 113).

Phillips delineates and differentiates how psychology evolved to explain human nature as self-actional, inter-actional, and finally trans-actional—where human experience is understood as party to a number of transactions far more complex and integrated than our discourse often allows. This philosophical explanation of experience evolved is examined from its self-actional roots through inter-actional explanations to trans-actional experience. Transactional philosophy discards any twin or dualistic explanation of human nature found in the former two.

Pre-Platonic views of good vs. evil (self-actional) were dominated by the idea that a supernatural power existed within inanimate objects as if plants have a mind or soul of their own, known as animism. Plato's explanations suggested a bifurcation of the mind and body that defined our human nature. In order to reason, he asserted that we must rid ourselves of the "foolishness of the body" to attain purity in a spiritual or godly sense. These inter-actional explanations were rejected by contemporary transactionalists. Unlike Plato, Aristotle thought the "soul [or psyche] and body formed a union which, while it lasted, is complete, and in which the two are viewed as merely aspects distinguishable by the philosophic eye." Aristotle's writing became the basis of learning theories about associations by recalling "similarity, contrast, and contiguity" (the latter meaning the proximity of stimulus and response) which author Phillips reads as continuing to fall within a spectrum of dualistic thinking. At least Aristotle conceived of human nature as an organic whole until the 17th-century explanations of French philosopher René Descartes, the architect of modern western philosophy.

Whereas for Aristotle, the soul – or psyche – realized itself in and through the body, and matter and form were two aspects involved in all existence, separable only through analysis, Descartes posited a definite bifurcation of body and soul, mind and matter.

Descartes worked around this dualism by inventing a theory of interaction "that assumed that body and soul worked directly upon one another." It would take three centuries to depart from Descartes. A school of thought based on physical "stimulus-response" reactions known as Associationism developed composed of several divisions, including connectionism, founded by American psychologist Edward L. Thondike. Connectionism became a widely-held theory that "all mental processes consist of the functioning of native and acquired connections between situations and responses.” The evolution of these explanations contributed to theories of learning and education that were challenged by John Dewey and other transactionalists. Dewey would argue in his article “The Reflex Arc Concept in Psychology,” (The Psychological Review) that modern psychologists were simply reinscribing the duality of the mind-body split onto the pairing of stimulus-response. Dewey "maintained that behaviors were to be treated as directly subjects of research in their own right, not as ‘mental’ or ‘psychological’...[and he asserted that] stimulus and response [were] phases of a complete event rather than its factors." If scholars were to accept the bifurcated framing of human nature, life would only be a series of random or arbitrary stimulus-response reactions. Dewey detected defects in this idea, which he illustrated via a child-candle sequence:

The ordinary interpretation would say the sensation of light is a stimulus to the grasping as a response, the burn resulting is a stimulus to withdrawing the hand as response and so on.

Phillips explained Dewey's thinking further, "There was the assumption that sensory stimulus and motor response are separate mental entities, whereas they are always inside a coordination and have their significance purely from the part played in maintaining or re-constituting the coordination."

The "series of jerks" observed in the experience of a child withdrawing from a candle's light as flame could only be explained as if its "origin is sought outside of the process of experience itself." Dewey rejected connectionism. "Each person is a party whose being and actions cannot possibly be understood apart from the fact of participation in the process of living, and [any individual's] earlier references to the total act, or coordination, within which transactions occur."

Citing the Ames studies of perception, Dewey argued that any purposive activity cannot be understood outside its connective context. To think is to be an aspect of a transaction in a specific and particular context. Human nature must be understand first and foremost where man is understood as an organism-environment together and at-once. Value is derived from satisfying a purposeful action or better yet a need for survival. Quoting Phillips on Dewey:

This capacity to sense value in the quality of his experience is, transactionalists emphasize, unique to man. The value-quality permeates all human wants, urges, desires, and aspirations. Further, man is able to sense qualitative differences in his experiences; the value-quality of a particular experience is sensed in terms of value expectations or value standards registered through previous transactions.

It is only through an engagement with our surroundings that we satisfy our needs and wants. Experience is transaction. Understanding how assumptions (creative inventions known as intelligence) and the ways we transact to survive are essential to living a satisfactory (not simply a satisfying) life. The chapter closes with several tenets, one of which summarizes why transactionalism is key to building a successful educative process: "Through action, assumptions are validated or modified; without action ‘knowledge’ remains untried, unproven, mere information."

=== Chapter V: The Educative Process ===
The educative process discussed in the fifth and final chapter built upon a theme of an anti-dualistic learning practice that eliminates the confusion and inaccuracies perpetuated by former theories of philosophy and psychology.

The transactional point of view, or approach, provides an escape from the schizophrenic dilemma which would appear to be the inevitable consequence of any philosophy that divides the world of man into two realms that can never be brought together: a realm of subjective sensations and perceptions which exist only in the mind of the knower, and a realm of outer, external objects which exist only in a world characterized as entirely non-mental or purely real.

The process of learning is re-examined from the tenets outlined in the two previous chapters utilizing works by John Dewey including Experience and Education (1963), The Child and the Curriculum (1956), and Democracy and Education (1961). A proper education is one that takes account of both continuity and interaction. The entire purpose of Phillips' dissertation work was to expound on an educational philosophy based on transactionalism.

The fundamental factors in the educative process are an immature, undeveloped being; and certain social aims, meanings, values incarnate in the matured experience of the adult. The educative process is the due interaction of these forces. Such a conception of each in relation to the other as facilitates completest and freest interaction is the essence of educational theory.

Phillips presents a new model of man: "Each member of the human race is a transactional system, through which relationships are worked out with the environment." Citing American psychologist Hadley Cantril, the author points the loss of attention to the learner's purpose as a significant error in modern educational systems. Interest and purpose by both teacher and, more importantly, each student are essential to an effective transactional approach to learning. Citing American scientist Adelbert Ames, Jr., he articulates how learning is developed not from some mere stimulus-response to an object of learning—a book or information or a video, for instance. Learning is not the outcome of presenting knowledge as some "existing ‘entity,’ as an absolute, present before learning is able to begin." A pitfall of many systems of learning is "disregarding, and working counter to, the learner’s purpose, in the light of which his very perceptions arise." A teacher must engage in and become aware of students' past experiences and perceptions. "The behavior of the child [or any student] is wholly determined by the way in which he perceives his world." Thus, creativity and intelligence arise not from talent or exceptional behavior, but from a background that is broad and rich. Once perceptions are correlated, once dualisms are rejected, the learner whether child or adult must engage in constructing and organizing her/his experience for usefulness within their assumptive worldview. Only then can she/he "consequently modify his behavior as a total person."

Writing in the mid-1960s, Phillips bemoaned learning in his generation as dualistic paradigms of thinking persisted. "What is lamentable about this state of affairs is that the more the student is compelled to produce, the greater the separation between knower and known." Given subsequent efforts in U.S. education that lead to high stakes testing and information overload from technology to classrooms, Phillips' dissertation on the educational philosophy of transactionalism published here as a book offers readers a dense, sophisticated survey of an anti-dualistic and applied approach to education.
