= John Dewey bibliography =

This list of publications by John Dewey complements the partial list contained in the John Dewey article.

Dewey (1859–1952) was an American philosopher, psychologist, and educational reformer, whose thoughts and ideas have been greatly influential in the United States and around the world. He was a prolific writer and, over a career spanning some 65 years, his output was extraordinary, covering a wide range of topics.

The full collection of his writings, making up 37 volumes, has been edited by JoAnn Boydston for the Southern Illinois University Press (Carbondale, Illinois), as follows:

1. The Early Works, 1882–1898 (5 volumes)
2. The Middle Works, 1899–1924 (15 volumes)
3. The Later Works (17 volumes)

== Books ==
- Psychology (1st ed.). New York: Harper & Brothers (published 1887). 1886 – via Internet Archive.
- Leibniz's New Essays Concerning the Human Understanding: A Critical Exposition. Chicago: Scott, Foresman, & Company (published 1902). May 1888 – via Project Gutenberg.
- The School and Society (13th, Revised ed.). Chicago: University of Chicago Press (published 1932). November 1899 – via Internet Archive.
- The Child and the Curriculum (7th ed.). Chicago: University of Chicago Press (published October 1911). 1902 – via Google Books.
- Studies in Logical Theory (2nd ed.). Chicago: University of Chicago Press (published May 1909). 1903. ISBN 978-0-7905-7335-9 – via Google Books.
- Dewey, John; Tufts, James H. (1908). Ethics. New York: Henry Holt and Company – via Internet Archive.
- Moral Principles in Education. Boston: Houghton Mifflin Company. 1909 – via Project Gutenberg.
- "How We Think (Project Gutenberg)". How We Think. Boston: D. C. Heath and Company. 1910 – via Project Gutenberg.
- The Influence of Darwin on Philosophy And Other Essays in Contemporary Thought. New York: Henry Holt and Company. April 1910 – via Google Books.
- Dewey, John; Dewey, Evelyn (1915). Schools Of To-morrow. New York: E. P. Dutton – via Internet Archive.
- "Democracy and Education: An Introduction to the Philosophy of Education". Democracy and Education. New York: Columbia University Press (published 1916). August 1915 – via Internet Archive.
- Essays in Experimental Logic. Chicago: University of Chicago Press (published June 1916). April 3, 1916 – via Internet Archive.
- Reconstruction in Philosophy. New York: Henry Holt and Company (published 1920). September 1919 – via Google Books.
- Dewey, John; Dewey, Alice Chipman (January 5, 1920). Dewey, Evelyn (ed.). Letters from China and Japan. New York: E.P. Dutton – via Project Gutenberg.
- Human Nature and Conduct. New York: Henry Holt and Company. 1922 – via Project Gutenberg.
- Experience and Nature (1st ed.). Baltimore: Open Court Publishing Company. 1925 – via HathiTrust.
- "The Public and Its Problems (HathiTrust)". The Public and Its Problems. New York: Henry Holt and Company. 1927 – via HathiTrust.
- Impressions of Soviet Russia and the Revolutionary World: Mexico - China - Turkey. New York: New Republic, Inc. 1929 – via Internet Archive.
- The Quest For Certainty. New York: Minton, Balch and Company. 1929 – via Internet Archive.
- "Individualism Old & New (Internet Archive)". Individualism Old and New. London: George Allen & Unwin, Ltd. 1931 – via Internet Archive.
- Philosophy and Civilization. New York: G. P. Putnam's Sons. 1931 – via Internet Archive.
- "Art as Experience (Internet Archive)". Art as Experience. New York: Capricorn Books (published 1958). 1934. LCCN 58-59756 – via Internet Archive.
- A Common Faith (1st ed.). New Haven: Yale University Press. 1934 – via Internet Archive.
- Liberalism and Social Action. New York: G.P. Putnam's Sons. 1935 – via Internet Archive.
- "Experience and Education (Internet Archive)". Experience and Education. Macmillan Publishers. 1938. ISBN 978-0-02-013660-6 – via Internet Archive.
- Logic, the Theory of Inquiry. New York: Henry Holt and Company. 1939 – via Internet Archive.
- "Theory of Valuation". International Encyclopedia Of Unified Science. Vol. 2 #4. Chicago: University of Chicago Press. 1939.
- "Freedom and Culture (Internet Archive)". Freedom and Culture. New York: Capricorn Books. 1939 – via Internet Archive.
- Dewey, John; Bentley, Arthur F. (1949). "Knowing and the Known (Internet Archive)". Knowing and the Known. Beacon Hill: Beacon Press – via Internet Archive.

== Articles ==
- Dewey, John (April 1882). "The Metaphysical Assumptions of Materialism". The Journal of Speculative Philosophy. 16 (2): 208–213. JSTOR 25667909.
- Dewey, John (July 1882). "The Pantheism of Spinoza". The Journal of Speculative Philosophy. 16 (3): 249–257. JSTOR 25667921.
- Dewey, John (January 1883). "Knowledge and the Relativity of Feeling". The Journal of Speculative Philosophy. 17 (1): 56–70. JSTOR 25667949.
- "The New Psychology". Andover Review. 2: 278–289. 1884. ISSN 1492-3173.
- Dewey, John (April 1884). "Kant and Philosophic Method". The Journal of Speculative Philosophy. 18 (2): 162–174. JSTOR 25668013.
- Dewey, John (April 1886). "Psychology as Philosophic Method". Mind. 11 (42): 153–173. eISSN 1460-2113. ISSN 0026-4423. JSTOR 2247469.
- Dewey, John (April 1886). "On Some Current Conceptions of the Term 'Self'". Mind. 15 (57): 58–74. eISSN 1460-2113. ISSN 0026-4423. JSTOR 2247361.
- Dewey, John (January 1891). "Moral Theory and Practice". International Journal of Ethics. 1 (2): 186–203. doi:10.1086/intejethi.1.2.2375407. JSTOR 2375407.
- Dewey, John (November 1892). "Green's Theory of the Moral Motive". The Philosophical Review. 1 (6): 593–612. doi:10.2307/2175919. JSTOR 2175919.
- Dewey, John (April 1893). "The Superstition of Necessity". The Monist. 3 (3): 362–379. doi:10.5840/monist18933314. JSTOR 27897085.
- Dewey, John (November 1893). "Self-Realization as the Moral Ideal". The Philosophical Review. 2 (6): 652–664. doi:10.2307/2176020. JSTOR 2176020.
- Dewey, J. (May 1894). "The Ego as Cause". The Philosophical Review. 3 (3): 337–341. doi:10.2307/2175977. JSTOR 2175977. PMC 4117121. PMID 25206028.
- Dewey, John (July 1896). "The Reflex Arc Concept in Psychology". The Psychological Review. 3 (4): 357–370. doi:10.1037/h0070405 – via Internet Archive.
- Dewey, John (January 1897). "The Psychology of Effort". The Philosophical Review. 6 (1): 43–56. doi:10.2307/2175586. JSTOR 2175586.
- "My Pedagogic Creed". Language Arts. 59 (6): 539–542. 1897. doi:10.58680/la198226455. JSTOR 41404057.
- Dewey, John (October 1902). "The School as Social Center". The Elementary School Teacher. 3 (2): 73–86. doi:10.1086/453152. JSTOR 992485.
- Dewey, John (December 1903). "Democracy in Education". The Elementary School Teacher. 4 (4): 193–204. doi:10.1086/453309. JSTOR 992653.
- Dewey, John (March 1904). "Significance of the School of Education". The Elementary School Teacher. 4 (7): 441–453. doi:10.1086/453348. JSTOR 992709.
- Dewey, John (June 8, 1905). "The Realism of Pragmatism". The Journal of Philosophy, Psychology and Scientific Methods. 2 (12): 324–327. doi:10.2307/2010861. JSTOR 2010861.
- Dewey, John (July 20, 1905). "The Postulate of Immediate Empiricism". The Journal of Philosophy, Psychology and Scientific Methods. 2 (15): 393–399. doi:10.2307/2011400. JSTOR 2011400.
- Dewey, John (March 1906). "Beliefs and Realities". The Philosophical Review. 15 (2): 113–129. doi:10.2307/2177731. JSTOR 2177731.
- Dewey, John (May 10, 1906). "Reality as Experience". The Journal of Philosophy, Psychology, and Scientific Methods. 3 (10): 253–257. doi:10.2307/2011250. JSTOR 2011250.
- Dewey, John (July 1906). "The Experimental Theory of Knowledge". Mind. 15 (59): 293–307. doi:10.1093/mind/XV.59.293. eISSN 1460-2113. ISSN 0026-4423. JSTOR 2248329.
- Dewey, John (September 1906). "Experience and Objective Idealism". The Philosophical Review. 15 (5): 465–481. doi:10.2307/2177753. JSTOR 2177753.
- Dewey, John (April 11, 1907). "The Control of Ideas by Facts. I". The Journal of Philosophy, Psychology and Scientific Methods. 4 (8): 197–203. doi:10.2307/2012166. JSTOR 2012166.
- Dewey, John (May 9, 1907). "The Control of Ideas by Facts. II". The Journal of Philosophy, Psychology and Scientific Methods. 4 (10): 253–259. doi:10.2307/2012070. JSTOR 2012070.
- Dewey, John (June 6, 1907). "The Control of Ideas by Facts. III". The Journal of Philosophy, Psychology and Scientific Methods. 4 (12): 309–319. doi:10.2307/2010741. JSTOR 2010741.
- "Religion and Our Schools". The Hibbert Journal. 6 (4): 796–809. 1908 – via HathiTrust.
- Dewey, John (February 13, 1908). "What Does Pragmatism Mean by Practical?". The Journal of Philosophy, Psychology and Scientific Methods. 5 (4): 85–99. doi:10.2307/2011894. JSTOR 2011894.
- Dewey, John (March 31, 1910). "Valid Knowledge and the "Subjectivity of Experience"". The Journal of Philosophy, Psychology and Scientific Methods. 7 (7): 169–174. doi:10.2307/2010781. JSTOR 2010781.
- Dewey, John (September 1, 1910). "Some Implications of Anti-Intellectualism". The Journal of Philosophy, Psychology and Scientific Methods. 7 (18): 477–481. doi:10.2307/2013388. JSTOR 2013388.
- Dewey, John (July 1915). "The Existence of the World as a Problem". The Philosophical Review. 24 (4): 357–370. doi:10.2307/2178744. JSTOR 2178744.
- Dewey, John (September 16, 1915). "The Logic of Judgments of Practise". The Journal of Philosophy, Psychology and Scientific Methods. 12 (19): 505–523. doi:10.2307/2012995. JSTOR 2012995.
- Dewey, John (April 1916). "Force and Coercion". International Journal of Ethics. 26 (3): 359–367. doi:10.1086/intejethi.26.3.2377050. JSTOR 2377050. S2CID 144707436.
- Dewey, John (December 21, 1916). "The Pragmatism of Peirce". The Journal of Philosophy, Psychology and Scientific Methods. 13 (26): 709–715. doi:10.2307/2012320. JSTOR 2012320.
- "The Need for a Recovery of Philosophy". Creative Intelligence: Essays in the Pragmatic Attitude (1st ed.). New York: Henry Holt and Company. January 1917. pp. 8–69 – via Internet Archive.
- Dewey, John (May 9, 1918). "The Objects of Valuation". The Journal of Philosophy, Psychology and Scientific Methods. 15 (10): 253–258. doi:10.2307/2940315. JSTOR 2940315.
- Dewey, John (January 19, 1922). "An Analysis of Reflective Thought". The Journal of Philosophy. 19 (2): 29–38. doi:10.2307/2939444. JSTOR 2939444.
- Dewey, John (June 8, 1922). "Realism without Monism or Dualism--I.: Knowledge Involving the Past". The Journal of Philosophy. 19 (12): 309–317. doi:10.2307/2939872. JSTOR 2939872.
- Dewey, John (June 22, 1922). "Realism without Monism or Dualism--II". The Journal of Philosophy. 19 (13): 351–361. doi:10.2307/2939610. JSTOR 2939610.
- Dewey, John (July 1922). "Valuation and Experimental Knowledge". The Philosophical Review. 31 (4): 325–351. doi:10.2307/2179099. JSTOR 2179099.
- Dewey, John (March 29, 1923). "Tradition, Metaphysics, and Morals". The Journal of Philosophy. 20 (7): 187–192. doi:10.2307/2939835. JSTOR 2939835.
- Dewey, John (November 8, 1923). "Values, Liking, and Thought". The Journal of Philosophy. 20 (23): 617–622. doi:10.2307/2014906. JSTOR 2014906.
- Dewey, John (April 10, 1924). "Some Comments on Philosophical Discussion". The Journal of Philosophy. 21 (8): 197–209. doi:10.2307/2015193. JSTOR 2015193.
- Dewey, John (February 26, 1925). "The Meaning of Value". The Journal of Philosophy. 22 (5): 126–133. doi:10.2307/2014306. JSTOR 2014306.
- Dewey, John (July 1925). "Value, Objective Reference and Criticism". The Philosophical Review. 34 (4): 313–332. doi:10.2307/2179375. JSTOR 2179375.
- Dewey, John (January 1926). "Substance, Power and Quality in Locke". The Philosophical Review. 35 (1): 22–38. doi:10.2307/2179262. JSTOR 2179262.
- Dewey, John (May 13, 1926). "Events and the Future". The Journal of Philosophy. 23 (10): 253–258. doi:10.2307/2014128. JSTOR 2014128.
- Dewey, John (July 1933). "Why Have Progressive Schools?". Current History. 38 (4): 441–8. doi:10.1525/curh.1933.38.4.441. JSTOR 45334348. S2CID 249088756.
- Dewey, John (May 21, 1936). "What are Universals?". The Journal of Philosophy. 33 (11): 281–288. doi:10.2307/2016451. JSTOR 2016451.
- Dewey, John (October 1937). "Education and Social Change". Bulletin of the American Association of University Professors (1915-1955). 23 (6): 472–474. doi:10.2307/40219908. JSTOR 40219908.
- Dewey, John (March 1940). "Nature in Experience". The Philosophical Review. 49 (2): 244–258. doi:10.2307/2180802. JSTOR 2180802.
- Dewey, John (Summer 1944). "The Democratic Faith and Education". The Antioch Review. 4 (2): 274–283. doi:10.2307/4609010. JSTOR 4609010.
- Dewey, John; Bentley, Arthur F. (January 4, 1945). "A Search for Firm Names". The Journal of Philosophy. 42 (1): 5–6. doi:10.2307/2020061. JSTOR 2020061.
- Dewey, John; Bentley, Arthur F. (April 26, 1945). "A Terminology for Knowings and Knowns". The Journal of Philosophy. 42 (9): 225–247. doi:10.2307/2019897. JSTOR 2019897.
- Dewey, John; Bentley, Arthur F. (November 22, 1945). "Postulations". The Journal of Philosophy. 42 (24): 645–662. doi:10.2307/2020339. JSTOR 2020339.
- Dewey, John (February 14, 1946). "Peirce's Theory of Linguistic Signs, Thought, and Meaning". The Journal of Philosophy. 43 (4): 85–95. doi:10.2307/2019493. JSTOR 2019493.
- Dewey, John; Bentley, Arthur F. (September 12, 1946). "Interaction and Transaction". The Journal of Philosophy. 43 (19): 505–517. doi:10.2307/2019771. JSTOR 2019771.
- Dewey, John; Bentley, Arthur F. (September 26, 1946). "Transactions as Known and Named". The Journal of Philosophy. 43 (20): 533–551. doi:10.2307/2019334. JSTOR 2019334.
- Dewey, John; Bentley, Arthur F. (November 21, 1946). "Specification". The Journal of Philosophy. 43 (24): 645–663. doi:10.2307/2020010. JSTOR 2020010.
- Dewey, John; Bentley, Arthur F. (May 22, 1947). ""Definition"". The Journal of Philosophy. 44 (11): 281–306. doi:10.2307/2019188. JSTOR 2019188.
- Dewey, John; Bentley, Arthur F. (July 31, 1947). "Concerning a Vocabulary for Inquiry into Knowledge". The Journal of Philosophy. 44 (16): 421–434. doi:10.2307/2019600. JSTOR 2019600.
- Dewey, John (April 8, 1948). "Common Sense and Science: Their Respective Frames of Reference". The Journal of Philosophy. 4 (8): 197–208. doi:10.2307/2019042. JSTOR 2019042.
- Dewey, John (June 1949). "Experience and Existence: A Comment". Philosophy and Phenomenological Research. 9 (4): 709–713. doi:10.2307/2103300. JSTOR 2103300.
- Dewey, John (September 1950). "Aesthetic Experience as a Primary Phase and as an Artistic Development". The Journal of Aesthetics and Art Criticism. 9 (1): 56–58. doi:10.2307/426103. JSTOR 426103.
- Dewey, John (Winter 1959). "Letters of John Dewey to Robert V. Daniels, 1946-1950". Journal of the History of Ideas. 20 (4): 569–576. doi:10.2307/2707892. JSTOR 2707892. S2CID 170432531.
