= Individualism Old and New =

1930 book by John Dewey

- Title page for Individualism Old and New (1930)
- Author: John Dewey
- Genre: Politics
- Publication date: 1930

Individualism Old and New is a politically and socially progressive book by John Dewey, an American philosopher, written in 1930. Written at the beginning of the Great Depression, the book argues that the emergence of a new kind of American individualism necessitates political and cultural reform to achieve the true liberation of the individual in a world where the individual has become submerged. Most of the chapters originally appeared as a series of essays in The New Republic, in 1929-1930.

== Overview ==
Dewey argues that America has become a socially corporate materialistic society which has been consumed by a culture of private pecuniary gain. Yet he also sees a simultaneous contradiction, for Americans do not outwardly value private gain in and of itself. Thus the individual is lost in a world of multiple and nearly meaningless associations; and until the individual and his groups are harmonized as one, the individual will remain submerged. However, the problem remains undiagnosed and unseen, for intellectuals are held back by their belief in an "older" individualism that refuses to acknowledge the corporate nature of American society.

Dewey writes that "as long as this conception possesses our minds, the ideal of harmonizing our thought and desire with the realities of our present social conditions will be interpreted to mean accommodation and surrender."

He thus argues for some kind of "socialism" where industry is controlled by democratic means. He argues that fixing the problem with culture is the same with that of liberating the individual: by abolishing culture driven by private pecuniary gain and reaffirming the importance of community and industrial cooperative control, Dewey argues that the individual will be harmonized with his communities and liberated to achieve true progress.

== Chapters ==
1. The House Divided Against Itself: Ironically, this references Abraham Lincoln's nomination acceptance speech, but Dewey is claiming that the new division is in the American mind. Americans still claim that people should act morally, and not solely out of selfish desire for profit, yet in all practical matters, they pursue and reward behavior that is selfish and profit-driven.

2. "America"—By Formula: American capitalism is not completely bad because it has brought people in the world together in some senses. However, American culture is flawed because it is materialistic and has become characterized by three things: quantification, mechanization, and standardization. As a result, in America the human soul is impersonalized and its spiritual growth is stunted.

3. The United States, Incorporated: In the U.S., pioneer individualism has been replaced by corporateness in the sense that the choices and actions of individuals are increasingly defined by more or less organized associations. Organized associations rather than isolated individuals direct and animate amusements (theater chains), sports (college sports), organized crime, and apartments and subways. Without awareness of the changed conditions, the influence of corporateness is largely mechanical and quantitative. But when corporateness is acknowledged and understood, the quality of experience changes. Individuals will understand choices and actions in a context of associations and can begin to act intelligently.

4. The Lost Individual: Stable individuality depends on stable objects of allegiance and clear ends of action, but these have disappeared. The past is too intellectually empty to provide guidance, and the present is too chaotic and diverse. Individuals become lost, lacking solid support, clear direction, and a unified outlook in the economic realm, in politics, in religion, in legislation, and in intellectual and artistic pursuits. Individualism taken to be private and exclusive economic gain will impede efforts to conceive the possibilities for freedom in the new corporateness and will promote confusion, detachment, and exploitation. The lost individual will only refind him or herself when traditional ideals are jettisoned, making way for a clear view of present conditions and the free exercise of imagination in conceiving a corporate society that promotes freedom for its members.

5. Toward a New Individualism: Individualism is not static and changes with the constitution of society. The rejection of older forms of individualism in light of a new corporateness is not a call for conformity. Individuals necessarily depend on social interaction, but there is a vital distinction between social relations that expand and deepen the meaning of those interactions and social conformity that constrains and standardizes those interactions thereby limiting meaningful experience. A new individualism will emerge when we take account of resources, including those of science and technology, and harness them not for individual pecuniary gain but for intelligent social and cultural ends that allow individuals to interact freely and meaningfully.

6. Capitalistic or Public Socialism?: This chapter considers the political phase of the changing character of individualism. Retaining the old notion of individualism creates confusion when considering the direction of the undeniably increasing social control of economic matters. Political leaders decry bureaucracy and laud individualism as the source of prosperity while also initiating social control of economic matters. This obscures the question referred to in the chapter title of whether this social control will consist of haphazard responses to events that threaten business aimed at pecuniary profit or else from public and intelligent planning aimed at ordered social development. The chapter accepts economic determinism as a fact and regards politics as secondary. Politics is a means, and acknowledged as such attention then can be paid to the ends it serves.

7. The Crisis in Culture: The American pecuniary culture hinders the growth of reason and the social nature of man in three ways: mentally, because of the formative effect of turning people into mindless parts of a machine in their work; Materially, because of inadequate distribution of wealth; and by corrupting education, because education too often directed only towards obtaining a job and not learning for the sake of learning.

8. Individuality in Our Day: Man needs to reexamine his old beliefs such as science and religion being ends in themselves. Man should then realize that all things need to be directed towards social ends, not selfish ends such as profit. He closes with a metaphor that new individualism is each cultivating his own garden without a fence, because the garden is the world and how he participates in its being.

== See also ==
- List of publications by John Dewey
