= Experience and Education (book) =

Book by John Dewey

- 1963 edition by Collier Books, NY
- Author: John Dewey
- Language: English
- Subject: Education
- Publisher: Kappa Delta Pi
- Publication date: 1938
- Publication place: United States
- Media type: Print (Hardcover and Paperback)
- Pages: 91
- ISBN: 0-684-83828-1

Experience and Education is a short book written in 1938 by John Dewey, a pre-eminent educational theorist of the 20th century. It provides a concise and powerful analysis of education. In this and his other writings on education, Dewey continually emphasizes experience, experiment, purposeful learning, freedom, and other concepts of progressive education. Dewey argues that the quality of an educational experience is critical and stresses the importance of the social and interactive processes of learning.

== Summary ==
Dewey was critical of both traditional and progressive education, that is he saw challenges within both educational approaches because they lacked a carefully developed philosophy of experience. Dewey's progressive learning theory is based on the idea that people, even young people, are not just blank slates waiting to be filled with knowledge from kinder through college. Instead, Dewey suggested that students organize fact-based comprehension through meta-cognition, or by building onto prior experiences, preconceptions, and knowledge, and therefore, the educator's role is in creating an educative experience.

=== Traditional vs. Progressive Education ===
Experience and Education opens by saying that humans organize thoughts, and ideas as "either-ors" and argues that this is mirrored in educational philosophy, namely in what Dewey labels as traditional vs. progressive education. Dewey conceptualizes education as being focused on bodies of information and skills that are passed from one generation to another. Dewey does not put traditional vs. progressive education against each other; instead, he is critical of teaching methods that are "static" and not incorporating enough experiential learning, which he notes young learners are more accustomed to. In addition, Dewey is critical of the old structure and its organization of educational philosophy.

=== The Need of a Theory of Experience ===
In Chapter 2, The Need of a Theory of Experience, Dewey argues that not all experiences are educative and that, in fact, some experiences can be mis-educative. The central challenge to experience-based learning is to create fruitful experiences and organize them in progression to guide students’ learning. A mis-educative experience stymies the growth of further experiences. Enjoyable experiences may be mis-educative if they are disconnected and promote dispersive, disintegrated and centrifugal habits. In traditional schools, people associated boredom with the learning process. The experiences had by teachers and students were of the “wrong kind.” It is not the absence of experiences in traditional schooling that Dewey finds troubling, but the defective nature of these experiences. Therefore, the educator's duty is to determine the quality of an experience. Each experience has two aspects: the immediate agreeableness or disagreeableness and its later impact on further experience. Educators must think about the experiential continuum—continuity of experiences.

=== Criteria of Experience ===
In Chapter 3, Criteria of Experience, Dewey delves more deeply into defining what constitutes experience for educational purposes and introduces the concept of directionality on the "experiential continuum". He argues growth can happen in an undesirable direction, as with that of burglars who become proficient at their professions. In this chapter, Dewey also raises questions about the built learning environment and critiques how traditional schools are insular environments rather than interacting with the world, which would promote an understanding of the world and provide a context. Dewey posits that everything must have a context to be able to draw from it and have it be educational.

=== Social Control ===
In Chapter 4, Dewey argues that the teacher in a traditional classroom, by nature of the social setting, was concerned mainly with "keeping order." In a progressive education classroom, social conventions would be enforced by the students who felt a part of the community and not forced on students by the teacher. Dewey uses the example of children playing games at recess, as he explains "The games involve rules, and these rules order their conduct...As long as the game goes on with a reasonable smoothness, the players do not feel that they are submitting to external imposition, but that they are playing the game." When things do not go smoothly, the player "may even get angry, but he is not objecting to a rule, but to what he claims is a violation of it." The teacher, in this instance, could act as the umpire or referee to which students would look to arbitrate disputes. In those few instances which the teacher had to intervene directly, as long as the teacher acted on behalf of the interest of the group, children would accept the teacher doing so. Dewey notes that traditional schools, which did not rely upon the establishment of a social learning community, tended to lack this social control, and therefore the teacher only had the option of "direct intervention" to "keep order."

=== The Nature of Freedom ===
In Chapter 5, Dewey asserts that the freedom of intelligence—the act of freely thinking, observing and judging—is the only freedom of enduring importance. Unlike traditional schools that enforce quiet and stillness, progressive learning allows teachers to assess their students on a deeper level because of the outward freedom they afford students. Freedom of movement is also an integral component of physical and mental health. Although freedom of movement is important, Dewey states outward movement does not always lead to progressive learning. Instead, Dewey believes that freedom of outer-movement is a means, not an end. Teachers therefore should address the need for external freedom on an individual basis with each student. Allowing students’ freedom of intelligence gives them the power to frame purposes, judge wisely, and evaluate their desires. Students need time to make observations of the world. Cultivating this freedom of intelligence or power means allowing students ample opportunity to reflect on their natural impulses by “stopping and thinking.”

=== The Meaning of Purpose ===
In Chapter 6, Dewey maintains that students must feel a sense of purpose in their learning to avoid mental slavery. Dewey describes a slave as someone who “executes the purpose of another or is enslaved to his own blind desires.” A genuine purpose consists of impulses, desires that are measured against perceived consequences. A purpose involves thinking about future consequences resulting from acting upon impulse. Schooling should not just concern itself with appealing to a student's desires or impulses. Educators must help students foresee the consequences of enacted impulses and desires. More importantly educators must help drive the direction of the purpose. The formation of purposes involves: observation of objective conditions; an assessment of past experiences with similar conditions; and judgment of observation combined with memory to determine significance.

=== Educator's role in creating educative experience ===
An experience-based model of education implies students learning new material must find a way to ground unfamiliar concepts and ideas within the scope of ordinary life-experience. Progressive education with an emphasis on experience-linked learning relies on the role of the educator to structure material being studied in a manner that facilitates this.

Conversely, students' diverse backgrounds create an infinitely diverse range of experiences for the educator to consider. It is his/her responsibility to organize learning experiences to allow assimilation of new material in a context appreciable by and beneficial to the student. Developing this structure first requires acknowledgement of experience as a vehicle of learning. Subsequently, the educator's discretion is important in selecting the material for a course of study and a sensitivity to weaving connections between the students' previous experiences and new material, such that the lesson learned is of greater value.

One of Dewey's preeminent concerns was the educator's role in creating an environment of education that provides continuity within this contextualized experience-based assimilative model of student learning. The difficulty in this challenge lies in continually adapting subject matter to the growing sphere of individual experiences as students progress.

== Editions ==
- Kappa Delta Pi, 1938, ISBN 0-684-83828-1
- Collier Books, 1963, ISBN 0-02-013660-9
- First Touchstone Edition, 1997, ISBN 0-684-83828-1
- "The 60th Anniversary Edition," Kappa Delta Pi, 1998, ISBN 0-912099-35-6

== See also ==
- John Dewey
- List of publications by John Dewey
- Center for Dewey Studies
- Experiential learning
- Progressive education
