= Trevor J. Phillips =

British-born philosopher and professor at Bowling Green State University

Trevor Joeseph Phillips (January 26, 1927 – March 17, 2016) was a British-born educational philosopher and Professor of Educational Foundations and Inquiry at Bowling Green State University, Ohio. He wrote a dissertation on the philosophy transactionalism.

== Life and work ==
Born in England, Phillips moved to Canada in 1947 and studied at Sir George Williams and MacDonald College. He was a teacher at Lake of Two Mountains and Sorel, Quebec, before moving with his family to the United States to pursue a doctorate at the University of Connecticut. From 1963 until 1996, he taught Educational Philosophy at Bowling Green State University, winning multiple awards for excellence in teaching. He served as department chair from 1991-1994 and retired from Bowling Green State University as a professor emeritus of Educational Foundations and Inquiry. Upon retirement in 1997, Phillips resided in Surrey, British Columbia, with his wife Lois. He co-founded and remained active in the member-run third age learning program at Kwantlen Polytechnic University. He had a son and two daughters.

Throughout his career as a professor, Phillips published numerous articles, editorials, and reviews on topics related to educational philosophy including the topics of humanistic education, secondary education, and psychology:

- Phillips, Trevor (January 1994). "HM Inspectorate of Schools and the National Union of Elementary Teachers: a study of their relations, 1870‐82". Journal of Educational Administration and History. 26 (1): 20–34. doi:10.1080/0022062940260103.
- Phillips, Trevor (July 1979). "Humanistic Education: Two Articles By Abraham Maslow: Introduction By". Journal of Humanistic Psychology. 19 (3): 13. doi:10.1177/002216787901900305. S2CID 143870733.
- Phillips, Trevor (8 March 2021). "Blair Plans an 'Upstairs-Downstairs' University System for England". Advocate: Newsletter of the National Tertiary Education Union. 10 (3): 35.
- Phillips, Trevor J (April 1979). "Who's Afraid of Schooling?". American Secondary Education. 9 (1): 3. ProQuest 1297762195.
- Phillips, Trevor J.; Bailey, Joe (1993). "Graduation Ceremony Prayers, 1993: What Happened?". American Secondary Education. 22 (1): 10–12. JSTOR 41064051.
- Bailey, Joe; Phillips, Trevor J (1995). "Graduation Ceremony Prayers: Continued". American Secondary Education. 23 (2): 8. ProQuest 1297764886.

== Transactionalism ==
Phillips' 1967 dissertation Transactionalism outlined the history, psychology, philosophy, and educational roots of a philosophy known as Transactionalism. This was published as Transactionalism: An Historical and Interpretive Study by Influence Ecology in 2013.

Transactionalism is a set of philosophical tools, or a method, employed to address the complexities of human social exchange or transactions. It refers to an approach rather than encouraging the philosophical position one should adopt in life. As a method of inquiry, it has been studied and applied to various disciplines including philosophy, education, psychology, political science, and social anthropology.

The pragmatic approach to and application of transactionalism in Phillips' work was primarily based on the theories and writings of John Dewey designed to advance a democratic way of life and learning. His dissertation was a historical and interpretative study of the life-work of John Dewey substantiated by additional scholarly thought from Aristotle, Arthur Bentley, Hadley Cantril, Charles Sanders Peirce, William James, C. Wright Mills and several others working in the fields of philosophy, psychology, physics, and epistemology. In five chapters, Phillips gathers information scattered throughout various articles and books to provide a systematic philosophical inquiry into the origins and development of transactionalism. This philosophy continues to be missing in many schools and systems of education from formal education in Western and/or English-speaking societies to business.
