= The Philosophical Review =

- Discipline: Philosophy
- Language: English
- Edited by: Sage School of Philosophy

Publication details
- History: 1892–present
- Publisher: Duke University Press for the Sage School of Philosophy at Cornell University (U.S.)
- Frequency: Quarterly

Standard abbreviations
- ISO 4: Philos. Rev.

Indexing
- ISSN: 0031-8108 (print); 1558-1470 (web)
- LCCN: sn98-23300
- JSTOR: 00318108
- OCLC no.: 39648313

Links
- Journal homepage; Online access; Online archive

The Philosophical Review is a quarterly journal of philosophy edited by the faculty of the Sage School of Philosophy at Cornell University. Since September 2006, it is published by Duke University Press.

== Overview ==
The journal publishes original work in all areas of analytic philosophy, but emphasizes material that is of general interest to academic philosophers. Each issue of the journal contains approximately two to four articles along with several book reviews.

The journal has been in continuous publication since 1892. Volume I contained articles by William James and John Dewey.

== See also ==
- List of philosophy journals
