= Experience and Nature =

1925 book by John Dewey

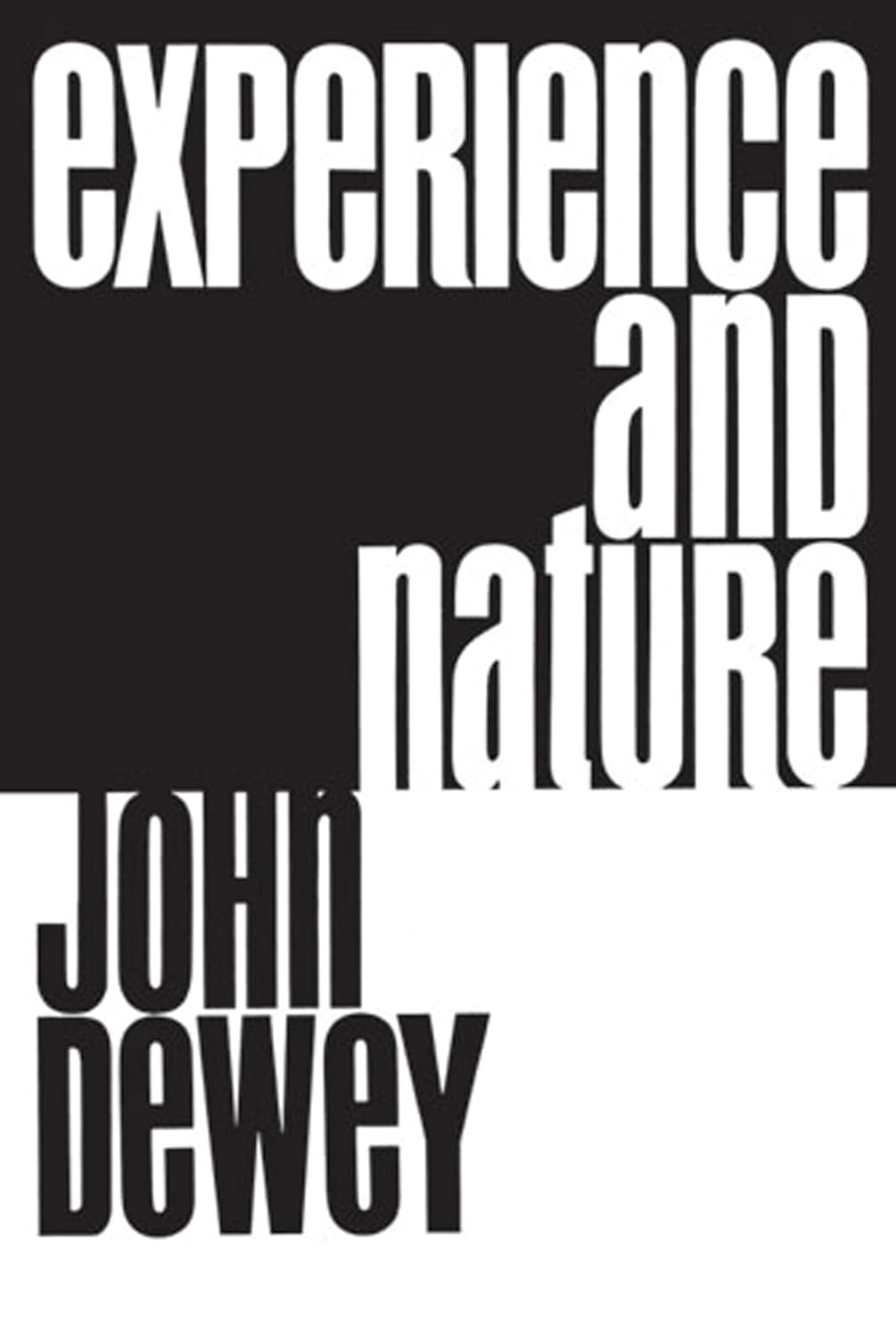
- Cover of second (1958) edition
- Author: John Dewey
- Published: 1925

Experience and Nature is a philosophical book written by the American philosopher John Dewey. First published in 1925, the book deals with the subject-object split and the empirical philosophical method. The account spans the history of Western philosophy, of which it demonstrates an intimate knowledge.

Oliver Wendell Holmes Jr. described Experience as "[although] incredibly ill written, it seemed to me after several re-readings to have a feeling of intimacy with the inside of the cosmos that I have found unequaled. So methought God would have spoken had he been inarticulate but keenly desirous to tell you how it was."

== Synopsis ==
In the book, Dewey attempts to reconcile the “subject-object split”, between the external natural world and our own experience of it, hence the title. He argues that even in empirical methods of science, there must include some visceral human experience, saying:

Darwin began with the pigeons, cattle and plants of breeders and gardeners. Some of the conclusions he reached were so contrary to accepted beliefs that they were condemned as absurd, contrary to common sense etc. But scientific men, whether they accepted his theories or not, employed his hypotheses as directive ideas for making new observations and experiments among the things of raw experience.

However, Dewey does not seem to view this dichotomy as totally false, or oppose it in principle. For example, he notes the effect of technology on the sciences, namely its emancipation from “noble and ideal” objects, saying:

When the appliances of technology that had grown more deliberate were adopted in inquiry, and the lens, pendulum, magnetic needle, lever [sic] were used as tools of knowing, and their functions were treated as models to follow in interpreting physical phenomena, science ceased to be identified with appreciative contemplation of noble and ideal objects, was freed from subjection to esthetic perfections, and became an affair of time and history intelligently managed.
