= Journal of Speculative Philosophy =

Academic journal

- Discipline: Philosophy
- Language: English
- Edited by: Vincent Colapietro, John J. Stuhr

Publication details
- History: 1987–present
- Publisher: Penn State University Press (United States)
- Frequency: Quarterly

Standard abbreviations
- ISO 4: J. Specul. Philos.

Indexing
- ISSN: 0891-625X (print); 1527-9383 (web)
- JSTOR: 0891625X
- OCLC no.: 497826301

Links
- Journal homepage; Online access

The Journal of Speculative Philosophy is an academic journal that examines basic philosophical questions, the interaction between Continental and American philosophy, and the relevance of historical philosophers to contemporary thinkers. The journal is published quarterly by the Penn State University Press.

== History ==
An unrelated journal by the same name was established in 1867 by William Torrey Harris of St. Louis, Missouri, becoming the first journal on philosophy in the English-speaking world. The journal ceased publication in 1893, but the name was revived in 1987 at the Pennsylvania State University with the founding of the Journal of Speculative Philosophy.
