= Elsie Ripley Clapp =

American educator

- Born: November 13, 1879; Brooklyn Heights, New York, U.S.
- Died: July 28, 1965 (aged 85); New Hampshire, U.S.
- Education: Vassar College (1903), Barnard College; Columbia University
- Occupations: Educator, Author, Progressive Education Pioneer, Editor
- Years active: c. 1910s–1939
- Organization(s): Progressive Education (national journal, Editor 1936–1939)
- Known for: Director of School and Community Affairs at the New Deal project Arthurdale
- Notable work: Community Schools in Action, The Use of Resources in Education

Elsie Ripley Clapp (November 13, 1879 in Brooklyn Heights, New York – July 28, 1965 in New Hampshire) was an American educator.

== Biography ==
Elsie Ripley Clapp was born to William Gamwell Clapp and Sarah Ripley Clapp. Clapp's mother was a pianist and her father was a stockbroker. Starting in her youth, she was plagued with health problems that would continue through adulthood. Over the course of her life Clapp would explore many endeavors from teaching to writing. She left a strong mark on the education world with most of her time and energy spent on Progressive Education. It was important to Clapp that the school and the community work hand in hand in order to provide maximum learning. Clapp had an extensive education which included time spent at Packer Collegiate Institute (1894-1899), Vassar College (1899-1903), Barnard College (1903-1908), Columbia University (1908) and the Horace Mann School of Teachers College (1908-1909). While at Barnard College she earned a Bachelor of Arts degree and at Columbia a master's degree in philosophy and a Bachelor of Arts degree in English.

Clapp's time at Columbia would prove to be the most influential to her future as an educator. This is where she met her mentor John Dewey. Clapp took classes taught by Dewey and worked as a teaching assistant for him from 1909 to 1913 and again from 1925 to 1929. Dewey had an interest in Progressive Education and encouraged Clapp to pursue a career in Rural Progressive Education. Dewey and Clapp maintained their relationship long after those initial days at Columbia. Throughout her life Clapp would continue to turn to Dewey for advice and guidance.

After college Clapp's first big job was working with a committee to help children of strikers in the Patterson Silk Workers Strike. She worked with many social activists such as Margaret Sanger, John Reed, Carlo Tresca and Elizabeth Flynn. Her teaching career was spent at many schools including; Ashley Hall, Jersey City High School, the City and Country School in New York City and Rosemary Junior School. It was at the City and Country School and Rosemary Junior School where Clapp really got to use her progressive ideas for the first time. Clapp was also the principal of Rogers Clark Ballard Memorial School near Louisville, Kentucky.

To Clapp, the most important factor in a successful education is linking the school with the community. It was this attitude that landed her a job as the director of school and community affairs at Arthurdale in the summer of 1934. Arthurdale was a piece of land bought by the government to be used as a place for unemployed miners to come and live with their families. With President Roosevelt's New Deal came the first federal subsistence project. This meant Clapp's job to improve the lives of displaced coal mining families in north central West Virginia would be government aided. It was a giant step for Progressive Education. During her time at Arthurdale, Clapp used Dewey's belief that community was the starting point for democracy. She did this by using the school as a social instrument and focusing on the Appalachian culture to build a self-identity and understanding among students and teachers alike. The students would learn a variety of subjects, including making cheese and singing folk songs. She also organized the students into interest groups, not in the traditional grade system. This project although deemed successful, was not truly realistic. Due to racial prejudice, politics and Jim Crow laws there were no African Americans included in the community. Unfortunately, Clapp's time at Arthurdale was cut short due to lack of private support. Clapp left Arthurdale in 1936, because she thought it would be the best thing for her to do. This project is still widely considered one of the most interesting and intriguing progressive experiments in rural education.

After her time at Arthurdale, Clapp spent her time editing, writing and teaching seminars. Clapp was the editor of the national journal Progressive Education from 1936 to 1939. She wrote the books Community Schools in Action and The Use of Resources in Education. In her later years Clapp became reclusive. Not much is known about these last years of her life. It is generally thought her health problems from her youth resurfaced causing her to become withdrawn. She died unmarried in Exeter, New Hampshire on July 28, 1965.

Clapp played a part in the development of American education. Many of her ideas have found their way into mainstream American education. The school is just a small piece of the bigger picture. In order for a school to be successful it must be involved with the community around it. This not only creates a safe environment but also a productive one. If the school and community are in alignment it will provide the students with a rounded background thus creating better educated citizens.

== Works ==
- Clapp, E. (1939). Community schools in action. The Viking Press.
- Clapp, E. (1952). The use of resources in education. Harper & Bros.
