= Knowing and the Known =

1949 book by John Dewey and Arthur Bentley

- Hardcover edition
- Author: John Dewey and Arthur Bentley
- Language: English
- Subject: Epistemology
- Genre: Non-fiction
- Published: 1949
- Publication place: United States
- Media type: Print
- Pages: 334 pp.
- ISBN: 978-0837184982

Knowing and the Known is a 1949 book by John Dewey and Arthur Bentley.

== Overview ==
As well as a Preface, an Introduction and an Index, the book consists of 12 chapters, or papers, as the authors call them in their introduction. Chapters 1 (Vagueness in Logic), 8 (Logic in an Age of Science) and 9 (A Confused "Semiotic") were written by Bentley; Chapter 10 (Common Sense and Science) by Dewey, while the remainder were signed jointly.

The terminology problem in the fields of epistemology and logic is partially due, according to Dewey and Bentley, to inefficient and imprecise use of words and concepts that reflect three historic levels of organization and presentation. In the order of chronological appearance, these are :

- Self-Action: Prescientific concepts regarded humans, animals, and things as possessing powers of their own which initiated or caused their actions.
- Interaction: as described by Newton, where things, living and inorganic, are balanced against something in a system of interaction, for example, the third law of motion states that for every action there is an equal and opposite reaction.
- Transaction: where modern systems of descriptions and naming are employed to deal with multiple aspects and phases of action without any attribution to ultimate, final, or independent entities, essences, or realities.

== Chapters ==
1. Vagueness in Logic
2. The Terminological Problem
3. Postulations
4. Interaction and Transaction
5. Transactions as Known and Named
6. Specification
7. The Case of Definition
8. Logic in an Age of Science
9. A Confused "Semiotic"
10. Common Sense and Science
11. A Trial Group of Names
12. Summary of Progress Made
- Appendix: A Letter from John Dewey

== Transactions ==
A series of characterizations of Transactions indicate the wide range of considerations involved.

- Transaction is inquiry in which existing descriptions of events are accepted only as tentative and preliminary. New descriptions of the aspects and phases of events based on inquiry may be made at any time.
- Transaction is inquiry characterized by primary observation that may range across all subject matters that present themselves, and may proceed with freedom to re-determine and rename the objects comprised in the system.
- Transaction is Fact such that no one of the constituents can be adequately specified as apart from the specification of all the other constituents of the full subject matter.
- Transaction develops and widens the phases of knowledge, and broadens the system within the limits of observation and report.
- Transaction regards the extension in time to be comparable to the extension in space, so that “thing” is in action, and “action” is observable in things.
- Transaction assumes no pre-knowledge of either organism or environment alone as adequate, but requires their primary acceptance in a common system.
- Transaction is the procedure which observes men talking and writing, using language and other representational activities to present their perceptions and manipulations. This permits a full treatment, descriptive and functional, of the whole process inclusive of all its contents, and with the newer techniques of inquiry required.
- Transactional Observation insists on the right to freely proceed to investigate any subject matter in whatever way seems appropriate, under reasonable hypothesis.

Illustration of differences between self-action, interaction, and transaction, as well as the different facets of transactional inquiry are provided by statements of positions that Dewey and Bentley definitely did not hold and which never should be read into their work.

1. They do not use any basic differentiation of subject vs. object; of soul vs. body; of mind vs. matter; or self vs. nonself.
2. They do not support the introduction of any ultimate knower from a different or superior realm to account for what is known.
3. Similarly, they do not tolerate "entities" or "realities" of any kind intruding as if from behind or beyond the knowing-known events, with power to interfere.
4. They exclude the introduction of "faculties" or other "operators" of an organism's behaviors, and require for all investigations the direct observation and contemporaneous report of findings and results.
5. Especially, they recognize no names that are offered as expressions of “inner” thoughts, nor of names that reflect compulsions by outer objects.
6. They reject imaginary words and terms said to lie between the organism and its environmental objects, and require the direct location and source for all observations relevant to the investigation.
7. They tolerate no meanings offered as "ultimate" truth or "absolute" knowledge.
8. Since they are concerned with what is inquired into, and the process of knowings, they have no interest in any underpinning. Any statement that is or can be made about a knower, self, mind, or subject, or about a known thing, an object, or a cosmos must be made on the basis of, and in the language applicable to the specific investigation.

In summary, all of human knowledge consists of actions and products of acts in which men and women participate with other human beings, with animals and plants, as well as objects of all types, in any environment. Men and women have, are, and will present their acts of knowing and known in language. Generic people, and specific men and women, are known to be vulnerable to error. Consequently, all knowledge (knowing and known) whether commonsensical or scientific; past, present, or future; is subject to further inquiry, examination, review, and revision.

== See also ==
- List of publications by John Dewey
- Transactionalism
