= Arthur F. Bentley =

American political scientist and philosopher

- Born: October 16, 1870; Freeport, Illinois
- Died: May 21, 1957 (aged 86)
- Education: Johns Hopkins University
- Parent(s): Frederick and Angeline Alice Bentley

Arthur Fisher Bentley (October 16, 1870 – May 21, 1957) was an American political scientist and philosopher who worked in the fields of epistemology, logic and linguistics and who contributed to the development of a behavioral methodology of political science.

== Family ==
The son of Charles Frederick Bentley (1843–1908), and Angeline Alice Bentley (1845–1911), née Dreisbach, Arthur Fisher Bentley was born at in Freeport, Illinois on 16 October 1870. He married Anna Harrison (1868–1924) in 1899.

== Education ==
He received his Bachelor of Arts in 1892 and his Ph.D. in 1895 from Johns Hopkins University. He studied with Herbert Baxter Adams, who in turn had been trained in Germany.

== Career ==
He taught at the University of Chicago for one year (1895–1896) and then decided to become a reporter. Later, he transitioned into editorial work at two Chicago papers, the Times-Herald and the Record-Herald. He left Chicago and life as a reporter in 1911, claiming poor health, and moved to a farm near Paoli, Indiana, where he lived for the rest of his life. The son of a successful banker, Bentley was able to finance his life as a scholar without having to work for an income. He was the second person to win the American Humanist Association's Humanist of the Year Award, in 1954. His later work was shaped by a close collaboration with John Dewey.

=== Orientation ===
Bentley held that interactions of groups are the basis of political life, and rejected statist abstractions. In his opinion, group activity determined legislation, administration and adjudication. These ideas of process-based behavioralism later became central to political science. His tenet that "social movements are brought about by group interaction" is a basic feature of contemporary pluralist and interest-group approaches.

=== Work ===
The Process of Government, first published in 1908 and still in print today, had much influence on political science from the 1930s to the 1950s. "The Human Skin: Philosophy's Last Line of Defense" was published in Philosophy of Science (Bentley, 1941). In 1949, he co-authored Knowing and the Known, a series of papers on epistemology, with John Dewey.

Bentley's papers, including his correspondence with Dewey, are kept in archives at Indiana University.

== Publications ==
- 1893: The Condition of the Western Farmer as Illustrated by the Economic History of a Nebraska Township.
- 1908: The Process of Government: A Study of Social Pressures.
- 1926: Relativity In Man And Society.
- 1932: Linguistic Analysis of Mathematics.
- 1935: Behavior, Knowledge, Fact.
- 1949 (with John Dewey): Knowing and the Known.
- 1954: Inquiry Into Inquiries: Essays in Social Theory.
