= Humpty Dumpty (magazine) =

American children's magazine

- Cover of May 1954 issue
- Categories: Children's magazine
- Frequency: Bimonthly
- Publisher: U.S. Kids Magazines
- First issue: October 1952
- Country: United States
- Based in: Indianapolis, Indiana
- Language: English
- ISSN: 0273-7590

Humpty Dumpty is a bimonthly American magazine for children 2 to 6 years old that takes its title from the nursery rhyme of the same name. The magazine features short stories, poems, nonfiction articles, games, comics, recipes, crafts, and more. Having been continuously produced for more than 65 years, it is one of the oldest American magazines for kids.

== History ==
Humpty Dumpty Magazine (then called Humpty Dumpty’s Magazine) was launched by George J. Hecht and Parents magazine in October 1952. Originally, it was a sister publication to Children's Digest, aimed at a younger audience than the latter publication. The first editor of Humpty Dumpty was Harold Schwartz. Another early editor was the children's book author Alvin Tresselt. In January 1980, both Humpty Dumpty and Children’s Digest came under the ownership of the nonprofit Saturday Evening Post Society. When Children's Digest was merged with Jack and Jill in 2009, Humpty Dumpty was continued.

== Features ==
The magazine holds an annual themed cover contest in which readers submit their artwork. The winning entry is featured on the front cover, with second-, third-place, and Readers’ Choice winners’ art showcased inside the same issue.

== Notable contributors ==
- Mel Alexenberg, American-Israeli artist, art educator, and writer
- Margaret Wise Brown, author of children's literature
- Martin Gardner, mathematics and science writer
- Charles Ghigna, poet and children's book author
- Lee Bennett Hopkins, American educator, poet, author, and anthologist
- Jack Kent, American cartoonist and author-illustrator of children's books
- Lilian Moore, poet, children's author, and editor
- Ilse-Margret Vogel, German-American author of children's books
- Jay Williams, American author of science fiction

== Criticisms ==
A 1986 study of several magazines for the very young, including Humpty Dumpty, concluded that only National Geographic World "solely and completely provided young children with entertainment and interesting information which offered many opportunities for extended discussion". A 1980 study was similarly dismissive of Humpty Dumpty and other children's magazines.

== Awards ==
- Parents’ Choice Award Recommended Winner, 2017
- Parents’ Choice Award Approved Winner, 2012
- Association of Educational Publishers Distinguished Achievement Award for “Autumn Moon,” 2011
- Parents’ Choice Approved Award Winner, 2011
- iParenting Media Awards Best Product Winner, 2009

== See also ==
- Children's literature
- Childhood in literature
- Children's literature criticism
