= Boston Evening Transcript =

Daily newspaper in Boston, Massachusetts

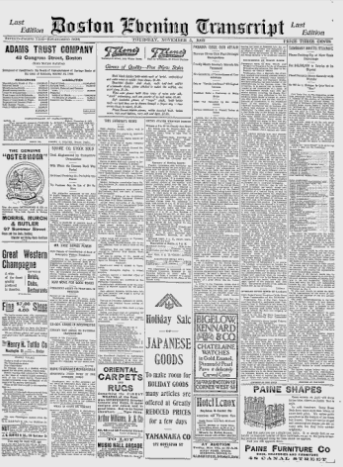
- Boston Evening Transcript, November 5, 1903
- Type: Daily newspaper
- Format: Broadsheet
- Owner: The Boston Transcript Company
- Founded: July 24, 1830
- Ceased publication: April 30, 1941
- Language: English
- Headquarters: 324 Washington Street, Boston, Massachusetts, U.S.
- Price: 5¢ at time that it ceased publishing.

The Boston Evening Transcript was a daily afternoon newspaper in Boston, Massachusetts, published for over a century from July 24, 1830, to April 30, 1941.

== History ==
=== Founding ===
The Transcript was founded in 1830 by Henry Dutton and James Wentworth of the firm of Dutton and Wentworth, which was, at that time, the official state printer of Massachusetts. and Lynde Walter who was also the first editor of the Transcript. Dutton and Wentworth agreed to this as long as Walter would pay the expenses of the initial editions of the newspaper.

In 1830, The Boston Evening Bulletin, which had been a penny paper, ceased publication. Lynde Walter decided to use the opening provided to start a new evening penny paper in Boston. Walter approached Dutton and Wentworth with the proposal that he would edit the paper and that they would do the printing and circulation.

The Transcript first appeared on July 24, 1830, however after three days Walter suspended publication of the paper until he could build up his patronage. After Walter canvassed the city to better develop the paper's business The Transcript resumed publication on August 28, 1830.

After Lynde Walter died, his sister, Cornelia Wells Walter, who had been the Transcript's theatre critic, became editor of the Transcript at the age of 29, the first woman to be appointed editor of a major American daily newspaper. Cornelia Walter served as the editor of The Transcript from 1842 to 1847.

=== Great Fire ===
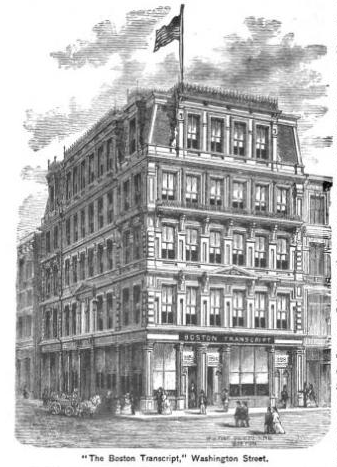
The Boston Transcript building rebuilt and enlarged after the Great Boston Fire of 1872

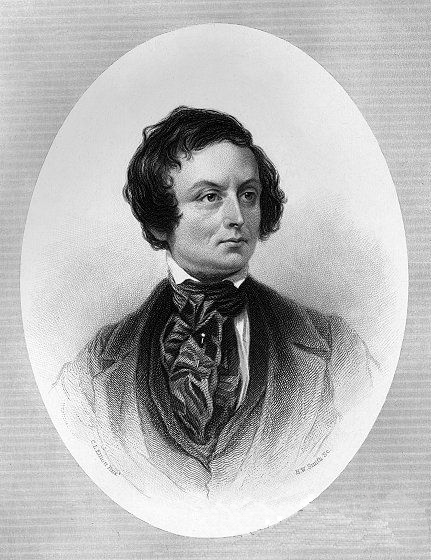
Former editor Epes Sargent

The Transcript's offices were destroyed in the Great Boston Fire of 1872. After the Great Fire, The Transcript's offices on Washington Street were rebuilt and expanded.

== Literary influence ==
In 1847, the poet Epes Sargent became editor of the paper. Many literary and poetic works debuted in the Transcript's pages. William Stanley Braithwaite was an influential literary editor from 1906–1931. He elevated the works of contemporary American poets and wrote an annual survey of poems published in American magazines.

An early version of "America the Beautiful" by Katharine Lee Bates first appeared in The Boston Evening Transcript on November 19, 1904.

Hazel Hall (poet)'s first published poem "To an English Sparrow", first appeared in The Transcript in 1916.

T. S. Eliot wrote the poem "The Boston Evening Transcript" referencing the newspaper in 1915.

== Features and columns ==
Features and columns included: "Suburban Scenes", "The Listener", "The Nomad", "The Librarian", "Saturday Night Thoughts", and an extensive book reviews and music criticism. The Transcript also had a Washington, D.C. bureau, college sports pages, and a department of Bridge. In addition, The Transcript had a well known genealogy column.

Harvard Medical School's first U.S. animal vivisection lab raised concern from then editor-in-chief Edward Clement, and the paper subsequently ran a series of anti-vivisection editorials.

In the summer of 1940, as Britain faced invasion in World War II, children were being evacuated overseas under a British government scheme known as the Children's Overseas Reception Board. The readers of the Boston Evening Transcript readily responded and agreed to sponsor a group of children. A group of 48 children left England on RMS Scythia from Liverpool on 24 September 1940 bound for Boston.

=== Genealogical columns ===
Because of the genealogy column, The Transcript is of value to historians and others. Gary Boyd Roberts of the New England Historic Genealogical Society noted:

The Boston Evening Transcript, like the New York Times today, was a newspaper of record. Its genealogical column, which usually ran twice or more a week for several decades in the early twentieth century, was often an exchange among the most devoted and scholarly genealogists of the day. Many materials not published elsewhere are published therein.

=== Contributors ===
- Brooks Atkinson, police reporter, assistant to the drama critic, H. T. Parker, (1919–1922)
- Clarence W. Barron, Transcript reporter (1875–1887)
- William Stanley Braithwaite, literary editor (1906–1931)
- Virginia Lee Burton, sketch artist
- Edward Downes, music critic
- John A. Holmes, served as poetry editor for eight years
- Francis H. Jenks, music and dramatic editor 1881–1894
- Howard Mumford Jones, book editor
- Henry Cabot Lodge Jr., reporter
- Kenneth Macgowan, drama critic
- John P. Marquand, was a staff writer on the paper and later on its bi-weekly magazine after he graduated from Harvard College
- John U. Monro, journalist and later dean of Harvard College
- Henry Taylor Parker, music, dance and drama critic (1905–1934)
- Edmund Pearson, (1880–1937) writer of the column, The Librarian from 1906 to 1920
- Lucien Price, (1907–1914) assistant music and drama critic, editorial writer, and journalist
- Epes Sargent, editor
- Paul Secon, music critic who also co-founded the Pottery Barn
- Nicolas Slonimsky, music writer
- C. Antoinette Wood, early 20th century American woman writer and playwright

== In popular literature ==
The Boston Evening Transcript is the title of a poem by T. S. Eliot, which reads:

The readers of the Boston Evening Transcript
Sway in the wind like a field of ripe corn.
When evening quickens faintly in the street,
Wakening the appetites of life in some
And to others bringing the Boston Evening Transcript,
I mount the steps and ring the bell, turning
Wearily, as one would turn to nod good-bye to Rochefoucauld,
If the street were time and he at the end of the street,
And I say, "Cousin Harriet, here is the Boston Evening Transcript."

== See also ==
- Boston Daily Advertiser
- Boston Herald
- The Boston Globe
- The Boston Journal
- The Boston News-Letter
- The Boston Post
- The Boston Record

== Archives and records ==
- Boston Evening Transcript records at Baker Library/Bloomberg Center's Special Collections at Harvard Business School
