= Edward Everett Hale =

American historian and minister (1822–1909)

The Reverend Edward Everett Hale
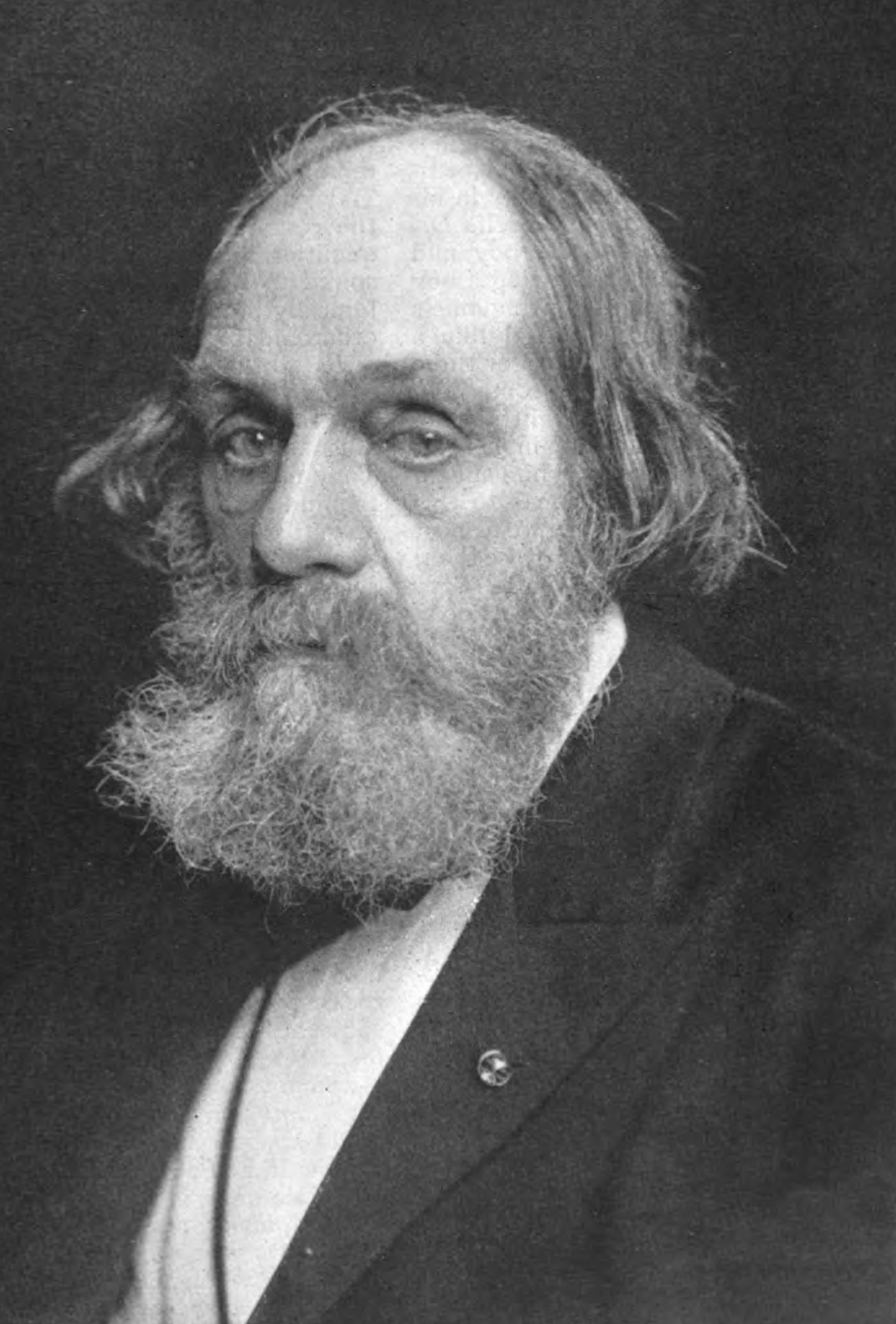
- From The Critic (1901)
- Born: April 3, 1822; Boston, Massachusetts, U.S.
- Died: June 10, 1909 (aged 87); Roxbury, Boston, Massachusetts, U.S.
- Education: Boston Latin School; Harvard College (1839); Harvard Divinity School
- Occupations: Author; historian; minister
- Children: nine, including Ellen Day Hale (daughter) and Philip Leslie Hale (son)
- Parent(s): Nathan Hale; Sarah Preston Everett
- Relatives: Lucretia Peabody Hale (sister); Susan Hale (sister); Charles Hale (brother); Edward Everett (maternal uncle); Nathan Hale (granduncle)

Edward Everett Hale (April 3, 1822 – June 10, 1909) was an American author, historian, and Unitarian minister, best known for his writings such as "The Man Without a Country", published in Atlantic Monthly, in support of the Union during the Civil War. He was the grand-nephew of Nathan Hale, an American Revolutionary War spy.

== Life and career ==
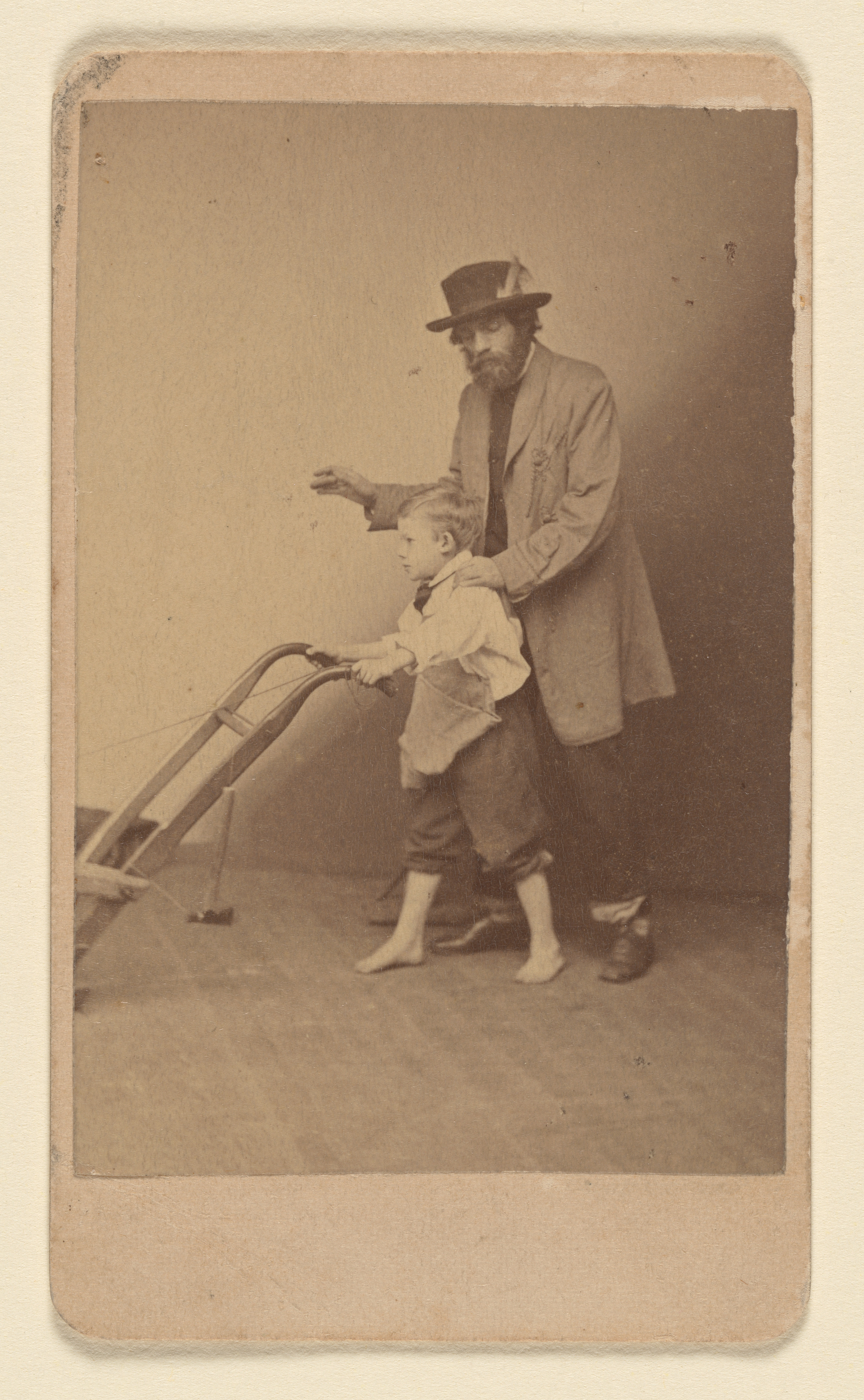
Edward Everett Hale and his son c. 1865

Hale was born on April 3, 1822, in Boston, Massachusetts, the son of Nathan Hale (1784–1863), proprietor and editor of the Boston Daily Advertiser, and Sarah Preston Everett; and the brother of Lucretia Peabody Hale, Susan Hale, and Charles Hale. Edward Hale was a nephew of Edward Everett, the orator and statesman, and grand-nephew of Nathan Hale (1755–1776), the Revolutionary War hero executed by the British for espionage. Edward Everett Hale was also a descendant of Richard Everett and related to Helen Keller.

Hale was a child prodigy who exhibited extraordinary literary skills. He graduated from Boston Latin School at age 13 and enrolled at Harvard College immediately after. There, he settled in with the literary set, won two Bowdoin Prizes and was elected the Class Poet. He graduated second in his class in 1839 and then studied at Harvard Divinity School. Decades later, he reflected on the new liberal theology there:

The group of leaders who surrounded Dr. [William Ellery] Channing had, with him, broken forever from the fetters of Calvinistic theology. These young people were trained to know that human nature is not totally depraved. They were taught that there is nothing of which it is not capable... For such reasons, and many more, the young New Englanders of liberal training rushed into life, certain that the next half century was to see a complete moral revolution in the world.

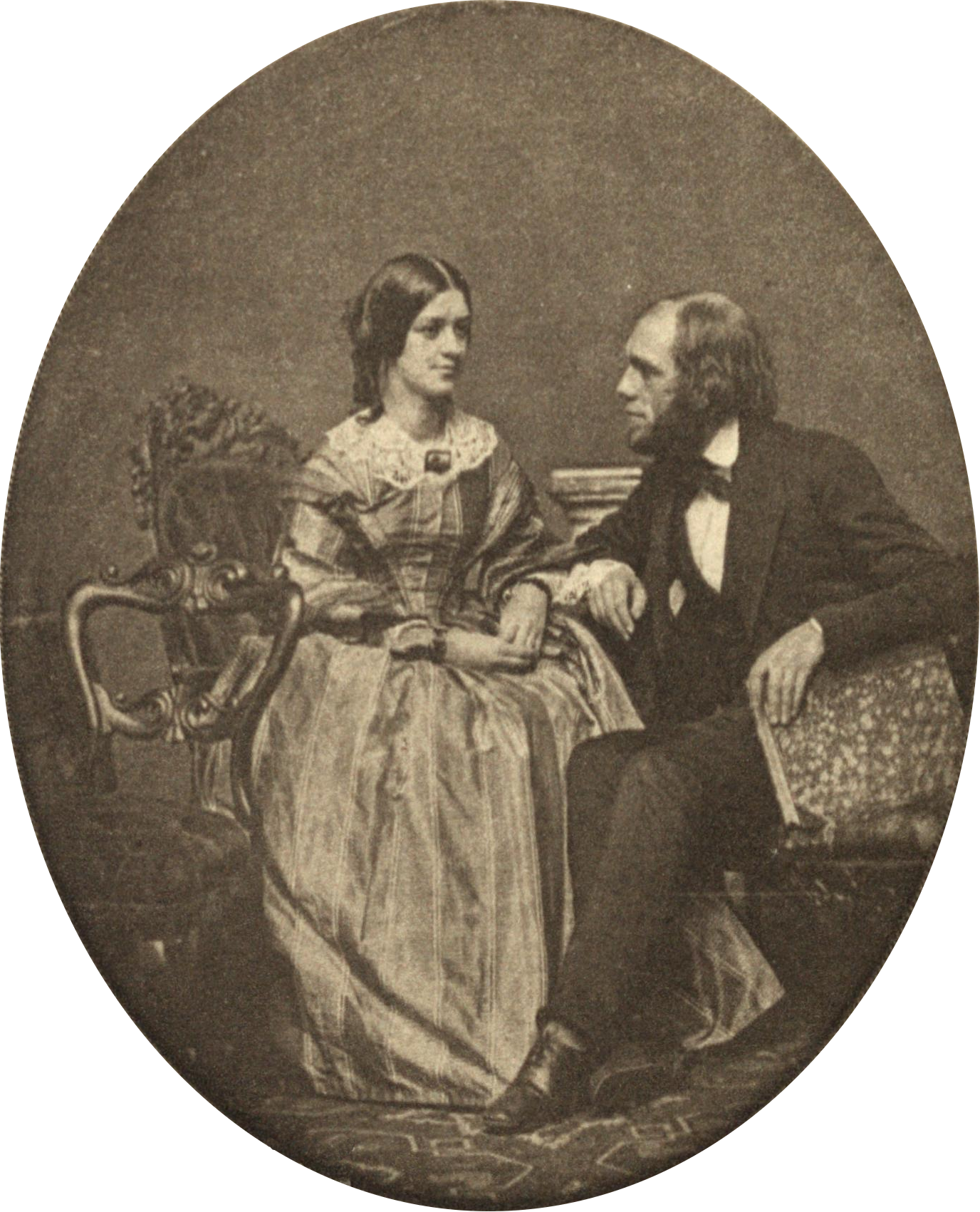
Edward Everett Hale with his sister Susan in 1855

Hale was licensed to preach as a Unitarian minister in 1842 by the Boston Association of Ministers. In 1846 he became pastor of the Church of the Unity in Worcester, Massachusetts. Hale married Emily Baldwin Perkins in 1852; she was the niece of Connecticut Governor and U.S. Senator Roger Sherman Baldwin and Emily Pitkin Perkins Baldwin on her father's side and Lyman Beecher, Harriet Beecher Stowe and Henry Ward Beecher on her mother's side. They had nine children: Alexander, born and died 1853; Ellen Day, 1854–1939; Arthur, 1859–1939;Charles Alexander, 1861–1867; Edward Everett Jr., 1863–1932; Philip Leslie Hale, 1865–1931; Herbert Dudley, 1866–1908; Henry Kidder, 1868–1876; Robert Beverly, 1869–1895.

Hale left the Unity Church in 1856 to become pastor at the South Congregational Church, Boston, where he served until 1899.

In 1847 Hale was elected a member of the American Antiquarian Society, and he would be involved with the society for the rest of his life, taking up various positions in the service of the society. He served two non-consecutive terms on its board of councilors, from 1852 to 1854, and a lengthy term from 1858 to 1891, and as recording secretary from 1854 to 1858. He served as vice-president of the society from 1891 to 1906, served a shorter term as president from 1906 to 1907, then again took up the position of vice-president from 1907 to 1909.

Hale first came to notice as a writer in 1859, when he contributed the short story "My Double and How He Undid Me" to the Atlantic Monthly. He soon published other stories in the same periodical. His best known work was "The Man Without a Country", published in the Atlantic in 1863 and intended to strengthen support for the Union cause in the North. As in some of his other non-romantic tales, he employed a minute realism which led his readers to suppose the narrative a record of fact. These two stories and such others as "The Rag-Man and the Rag-Woman" and "The Skeleton in the Closet", gave him a prominent position among short-story writers of 19th century America. His short story "The Brick Moon", serialized in the Atlantic Monthly, is the first known fictional description of an artificial satellite. It was possibly an influence on the novel The Begum's Fortune by Jules Verne. He was elected a Fellow of the American Academy of Arts and Sciences in 1865. In 1870, he was elected as a member to the American Philosophical Society.

In recognition of his support for the Union during the American Civil War, Hale was elected as a Third Class Companion of the Military Order of the Loyal Legion of the United States.

Hale assisted in founding the Christian Examiner, Old and New in 1869 and became its editor. The story "Ten Times One is Ten" (1870), with its hero Harry Wadsworth, contained the motto, first enunciated in 1869 in his Lowell Institute lectures: "Look up and not down, look forward and not back, look out and not in, and lend a hand." This motto was the basis for the formation of Lend-a-Hand Clubs, Look-up Legions and Harry Wadsworth Clubs for young people. Out of the romantic Waldensian story "In His Name" (1873) there similarly grew several other organizations for religious work, such as King's Daughters, and King's Sons. In 1875, the Christian Examiner merged with Scribner's Magazine. In 1881, Hale published the story "Hands Off" in Harper's New Monthly Magazine. In the tale, a narrator goes through time to alter events in the past, thereby creating an alternate timeline. Paul J. Nahin writes that this story makes Hale a pioneer in emerging science fiction, time travel, and stories about changing the past.

In the early 1880s Harriet E. "Hattie" Freeman became one of Hale's volunteer secretaries. Her family had been connected with Hale's church since 1861. As Hattie and Hale worked together they grew closer and closer. According to historian Sara Day, their relationship became loving and intimate. Day came to this conclusion after studying 3,000 Hale-Freeman love letters (1884–1909) held by the Library of Congress. The letters, donated to the library in 1969, had held their secrets until 2006 when Day realized that the intimate passages were written in Towndrow's shorthand.

In 1886, Hale founded Lend a Hand, which merged with the Charities Review in 1897, and the Lend a Hand Record. Throughout his life he contributed many articles on a variety of subjects to the periodicals of his day including the North American Review, the Atlantic Monthly, the Christian Register, the Outlook, and many more. He was the author or editor of more than sixty books—fiction, travel, sermons, biography and history.

On November 20, 1891, Hale founded the Ten Times One Corporation to implement the ideas laid out in the original story. In 1898, the organization changed its name to Lend A Hand Society, and continues to serve those in need in the Boston area.

He was awarded American Library Association Honorary Membership in 1895.

Hale retired as minister from the South Congregational Church in 1899 and chose as his successor Edward Cummings, father of E. E. Cummings. By the turn of the century, Hale was recognized as among the nation's most important men of letters. Bostonians asked him to help ring in the new century on December 31, 1900, by presenting a psalm on the balcony of the Massachusetts State House.

In 1903 he became Chaplain of the United States Senate, and joined the Literary Society of Washington. The next year, he was elected as a member of the Academy of Arts and Sciences. Also in 1904, he was one of several high-profile investors who backed the Intercontinental Correspondence University, but the institution folded by 1915.

Hale lived from 1869 to his death at the Edward Everett Hale House in Roxbury. He maintained a summer home in South Kingstown, Rhode Island where he and his family often spent summer months.

Hale died in Roxbury, by then part of Boston, in 1909. He was buried at Forest Hills Cemetery in Jamaica Plain, Suffolk County, Massachusetts. A life-size likeness in bronze statue memorializing the man and his works stands in the Boston Public Garden.

Rev E. E. Hale cabinet card portrait

== Beliefs ==
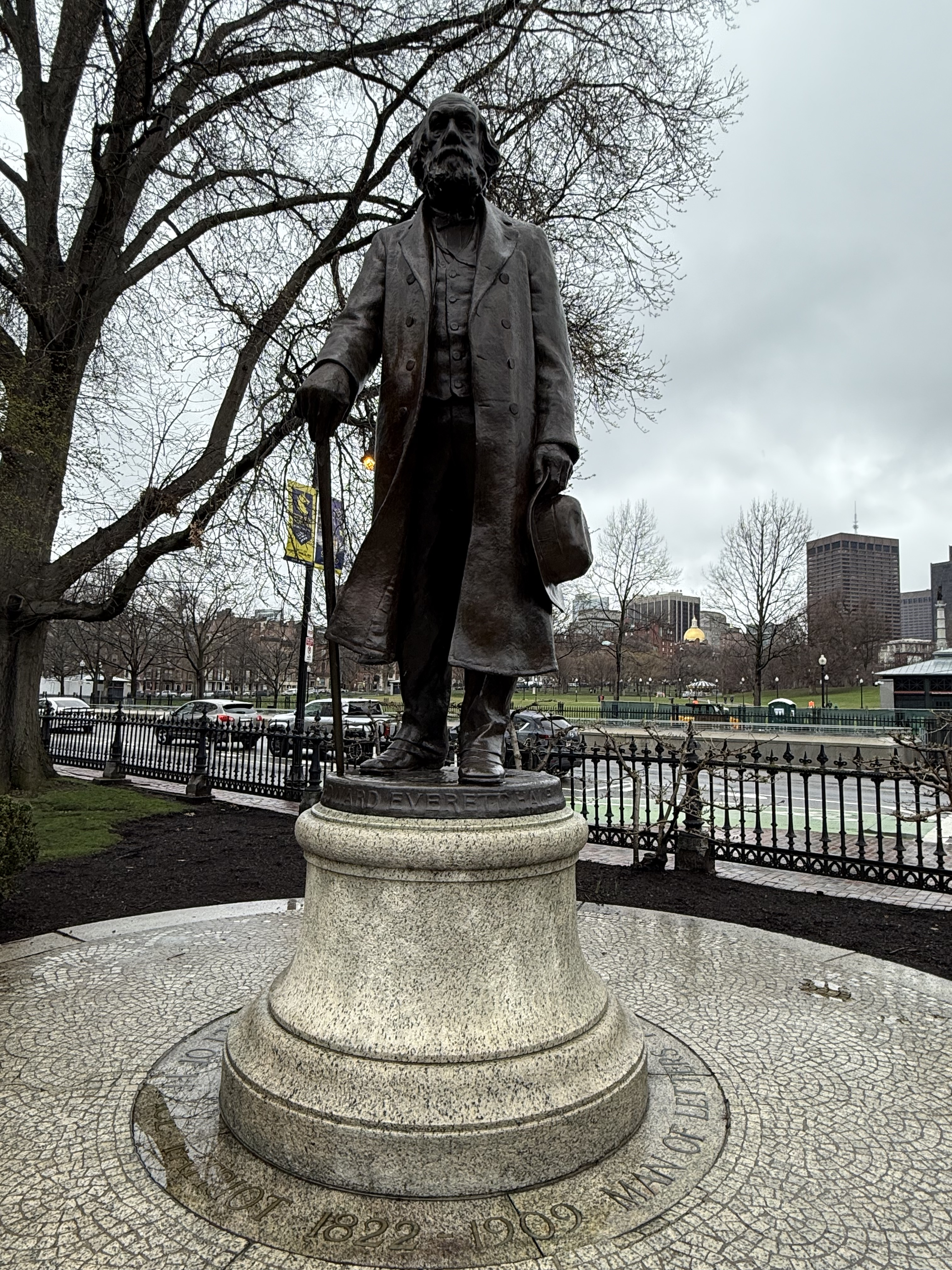
Statue of Hale by Bela Pratt in the Boston Public Garden, Boston, Massachusetts

Combining a forceful personality, organizing genius, and liberal practical theology, Hale was active in raising the tone of American life for half a century. He had a deep interest in the anti-slavery movement (especially in Kansas), as well as popular education (involving himself especially with the Chautauqua adult-education movement), and the working-man's home.

He published a wide variety of works in fiction, history and biography. He used his writings and the two magazines he founded, Old and New (1870–75) and Lend a Hand (1886–97), to advance a number of social reforms, including religious tolerance, the abolition of slavery and wider education. Writer-educator Mary Lowe Dickinson served as Hale's associate editor for Lend a Hand.

Hale supported Irish immigration in the mid-19th century, as he felt the new workers freed Americans from performing menial, hard labor. In a series of letters in the Boston Daily Advertiser, he noted the "inferiority" of immigrants: "[it] compels them to go the bottom; and the consequence is that we are, all of us, the higher lifted."

Edward Everett Hale's story "The Man Without a Country" (1863) opened with the sentence: "I was stranded at the old Mission House in Mackinaw, waiting for a Lake Superior steamer which did not choose to come." In his 1893 and 1900 reminiscences, Hale states that "To write the story of 'The Man Without a Country' and its sequel, 'Philip Nolan's Friends,' I had to make as careful a study as I could of the history of the acquisition of Louisiana by the United States."

== See also ==
- International Order of the King's Daughters and Sons

Religious titles
Preceded by F.J. Prettyman	51st US Senate Chaplain; December 14, 1903 – June 10, 1909	Succeeded by Ulysses Grant Baker Pierce
