= Jack and Jill (magazine) =

American bimonthly magazine for children

- March 2008 cover
- Categories: Children's magazine
- Frequency: Bimonthly
- First issue: 1938
- Company: Saturday Evening Post Society
- Country: United States
- Based in: Indianapolis, Indiana
- Language: English
- Website: www.uskidsmags.com/magazines/jack-and-jill/
- ISSN: 0021-3829

Jack and Jill is an American bimonthly magazine for children 6 to 12 years old that takes its title from the nursery rhyme of the same name. It features stories and educational activities.

The magazine features nonfiction articles, short stories, poems, games, comics, recipes, crafts, and more. Having been continuously produced for 80 years, it is one of the oldest American magazines for kids.

== Mission ==
As part of the Children's Better Health Institute—a division of the Saturday Evening Post Society Inc., a 501 (c)(3) nonprofit charitable organization—Jack and Jill's mission is to promote the healthy physical, educational, creative, social, and emotional growth of children in a format that is engaging, stimulating, and entertaining for children ages 6 to 12.

== History ==
Jack and Jill magazine was launched by Curtis Publishing Company in 1938. It was the first addition to the Curtis line of magazines since it purchased Country Gentleman in 1911. The first editor of Jack and Jill was Ada Campbell Rose daughter-in-law of Philip Sheridan Rose, the editor of Country Gentleman. It was headquartered in Philadelphia, Pennsylvania. The magazine's circulation grew to half a million before newsstand sales (but not subscriptions) were suspended during World War II due to paper shortages. Newsstand sales returned in 1948. Ada Campbell Rose continued as editor until 1959. The magazine began to accept outside advertising in 1962. In the early 1970s the magazine was published by Review Publishing Co. in Indianapolis, Indiana. In 2009, Jack and Jill merged with Children's Digest, another kids magazine from the same publisher.

The Saturday Evening Post Executive Editor Troy Brownfield is also Executive Editor of Jack and Jill. Jack and Jill is one of two children's publications in the U.S. Kids family of magazines, which are published by the Children's Better Health Institute, a division of the nonprofit The Saturday Evening Post Society. Its sister publication under the U.S. Kids banner is Humpty Dumpty (for children ages 2 to 6). The headquarters of Jack and Jill is in Indianapolis, Indiana.

== Features ==
- U.S. Kids Cover Contest: Jack and Jill holds an annual themed cover contest in which readers submit their artwork. The winning entry is featured on the front cover, with second-, third-place, and Readers' Choice winners' art showcased inside the same issue. In addition, U.S. Kids also recognizes winners' art departments and teachers with cash awards to help support their programs. School art programs have been awarded more than $25,000 from the contest so far. Through this contest, U.S. Kids hopes to encourage young minds and those who teach them to continue creating wonderful art.
- Reader-Created Content: Jack and Jill's editors strive to include as much kid-created content as possible, including their letters, personal essays, questions, photos, short poems, and artwork.
- Nonfiction: Most of the nonfiction articles in Jack and Jill feature regular kids or groups of kids who are engaged in unusual, challenging, or interesting activities and serve as inspiration for readers.
- Fiction: The fiction stories that appear in Jack and Jill are fun, engaging, and filled with humor. They provide kids with positive messages, such as self-reliance, being kind to others, and appreciating other cultures through modern characters.
- Recipes: Each issue of the magazine includes a healthy, easy-to make recipe that kids can prepare themselves. The recipes promote healthy eating by incorporating fresh fruits and vegetables, whole grains, and muscle-building proteins.
- Crafts: Each issue offers a new and unique age-appropriate craft that promotes the development of creativity.
- Games/Puzzles: Jack and Jill magazine offers several pages of challenging puzzles and games in each issue, which promote problem-solving and independent thinking.

== Notable contributors ==
American author Pearl S. Buck, winner of the 1932 Pulitzer Prize and the 1938 Nobel Prize in Literature for her novel The Good Earth, contributed "One Bright Day", a two-part story that appeared in the August and September 1950 issues.

Cartoonist Ted Key contributed the two-page feature "Diz and Liz" from 1961 to 1972.

Children's author Ruth Plumly Thompson contributed the feature "Perky Puppet" from 1965 to 1970.

Charles Ghigna ("Father Goose"), renowned poet and children's book author of 100 award-winning books and a Pulitzer Prize nominee for Returning to Earth, served on Jack and Jill's editorial advisory board and has had his work published in the magazine.

Renowned comic book writer Justin Gray contributed scripts for Jack and Jill's comics pages for several years.

Acclaimed children's author David A. Adler has written a new Cam Jansen short story specifically for Jack and Jill, which appeared in the Sep/Oct 2012 issue.

New York Times bestselling author Ben H. Winters, author of The Secret Life of Ms. Finkleman, The Mystery of the Missing Everything, and Sense and Sensibility and Sea Monsters, wrote an original short story for Jack and Jill, which was published in the Nov/Dec 2012 issue.

== Awards ==
- Parents' Choice Award Approved Winner, 2017
- Parents' Choice Award Approved Winner, 2013
- Parents' Choice Award Approved Winner, 2011
- iParenting Media Awards Best Product Winner, 2009
