= Children's Digest =

Children's magazine

- The front cover of the October 1950 issue of Children's Digest, the first issue of this publication
- Former editors: Harold Schwartz, Elizabeth Redousakis Mattheos, Anita Malnig, Lois Cantrell
- Frequency: monthly
- Circulation: 700,000 (1971)
- Publisher: Parents Magazine Press (1950–c. 1980); Benjamin Franklin Literary and Medical Society (c. 1980–2009)
- First issue: October 1950
- Final issue: May/June 2009
- Country: United States
- Based in: Indianapolis, Indiana
- Language: English
- ISSN: 0272-7145

Children's Digest (originally The Children's Digest) was a monthly children's magazine published in the United States from October 1950 to May/June 2009, after which it was merged with Jack and Jill. The magazine was advertised as "selected reading to delight, instruct, and entertain," offering "the cream of new stories for boys and girls, reprints of the best-loved classics."

== Publication history and format ==
Children's Digest was originally published by George J. Hecht and Parents Magazine Press in digest size. In 1980 the periodical was sold to the Benjamin Franklin Literary and Medical Society and was published in a larger format.

For many years Children's Digest was printed on light green paper, which the publisher claimed avoided eye strain while reading.

== Profile and features ==
The magazine's original concept was similar to that of Reader's Digest, but aimed at children aged seven to twelve. It reprinted stories, comics and, for a time, each issue contained a story book with many of its illustrations. A 1951 newspaper story stated Children's Digest contained an average of 40 pages of special comics dramatizing classic novels such as Gulliver's Travels and Alice's Adventures in Wonderland.

Some of the famous poems and stories that appeared during the magazine's early years were Carl Sandburg's Rootabaga Stories, Lucretia P. Hale's The Peterkin Papers, and L. Frank Baum's American Fairy Tales.

Starting in the 1960s the content of Children's Digest changed from reprinted stories to a combination of reprints, modern stories and nonfiction. The inscription on the magazine's spine had been "Best Stories - Famous Classics - Picture Stories", then became "Great Stories - History - Science - Biography - True Adventure." During 1969 Louis Wolf's Stories of Our American Past was in the January issue, Roy Chapman Andrew's All About Dinosaurs was published in February, and a biography of football star Joe Namath was in the November issue.

From 1966 to 1979 The Adventures of Tintin were reprinted in the magazine. These reprints increased Tintin's popularity in the United States for, at the time, Children's Digest had a circulation of around 700,000 copies monthly.

== Cover Illustrations ==
From December 1951 to September 1963, Japanese-American artist and author Gyo Fujikawa illustrated the covers. From November 1963 to December 1965, she did 6 additional covers. Other cover illustrators during this period include Arthur Syzk, Gustaf Tenggren, Anthony Ravielli, Ed Valergerski, Bob Kuhn, Frank McCarthy, Leonard Weisgard, Hergé, John Tenniel, Tomi Ungerer, and Gordon Laite.

== Change of ownership ==
In 1980 Children's Digest was sold to the Benjamin Franklin Literary and Medical Society, a nonprofit organization that purchased numerous magazines, including The Saturday Evening Post, Humpty Dumpty, Child Life and Jack and Jill. All of the periodicals were reformatted to emphasize health, safety, nutrition and exercise. Children's Digest ended publication in 2009.
