= Lucretia Peabody Hale =

American author and novelist

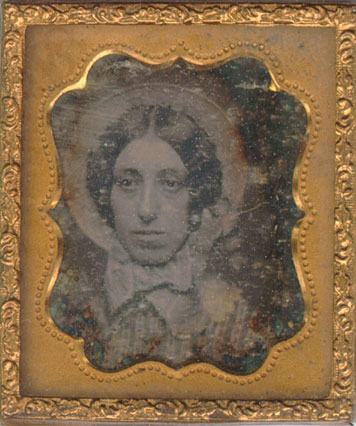
- c. 1850
- Born: September 2, 1820; Boston, Massachusetts, U.S.
- Died: June 12, 1900 (aged 79)
- Occupations: Journalist, writer
- Parent(s): Nathan Hale; Sarah Preston Everett
- Relatives: Edward Everett Hale (brother); Susan Hale (sister); Charles Hale (brother); Edward Everett (maternal uncle); Nathan Hale (granduncle)

Lucretia Peabody Hale (September 2, 1820 – June 12, 1900) was an American writer and editor, best known for her humorous The Peterkin Papers stories.

== Family and early life ==
Hale was born in Boston, Massachusetts, the daughter of editor and publisher Nathan Hale and writer Sarah Preston Everett. Her father was the nephew of Revolutionary War hero Nathan Hale, and was the owner and editor of the Boston Daily Advertiser. Her mother was a sister of Edward Everett, a minister and politician. She had articles published in leading magazines, including Godey's Lady's Book.

Hale was one of eleven children, though only seven lived to adulthood. She was the elder sister of Edward Everett Hale, and occasionally co-write books and articles with him. Hale was educated at George B. Emerson's school in Boston.

== Writing career ==
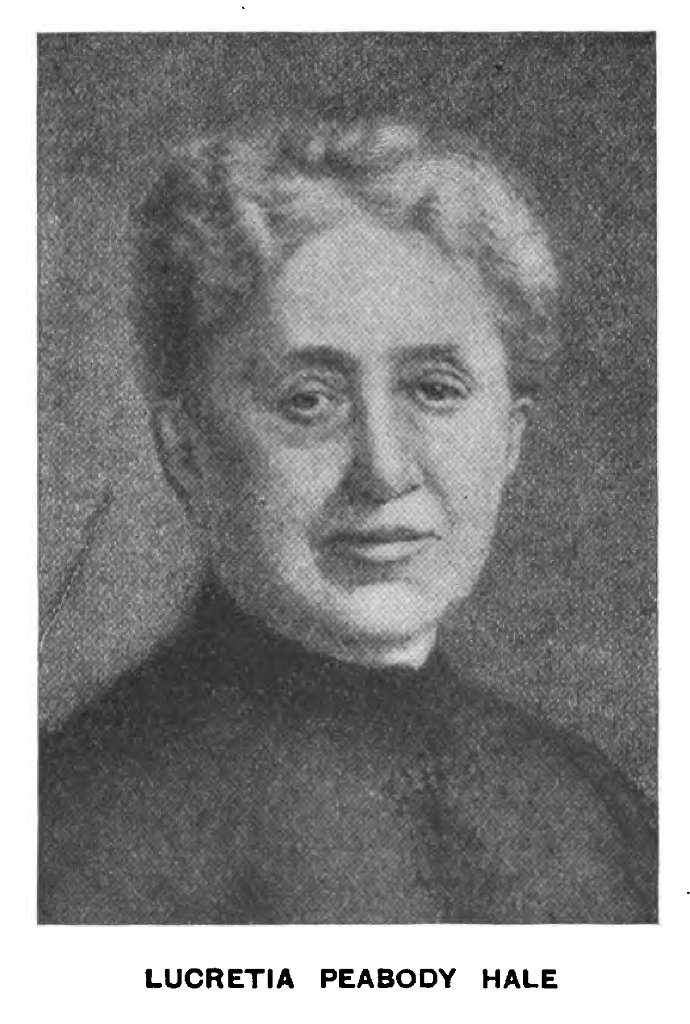
ca. 1900

In 1850 Hale and her brother Edward Everett Hale wrote the novel Margaret Percival in America, and in 1858 she began being published in magazines.

Most modern readers know her for a series of humorous stories about the Peterkin family, published in leading children's magazines. The first Peterkin story, "The Lady Who Put Salt in Her Coffee," was published in the April 1868 issue of Our Young Folks. The story was so popular that additional Peterkin stories were published in Our Young Folks, as well as St. Nichols. Selections from Hale's The Peterkin Papers children's book was reprinted in the December 1951 issue of Children's Digest.

From 1870 to 1875 Hale helped edit her brother's magazine Old and New.

=== Novels ===
- Margaret Percival in America, 1850 (co-written with Edward Everett Hale)
- Six of One by Half a Dozen of the Other, 1872
- The Wolf at the Door, 1877
- The New Harry and Lucy, 1892 (co-written with Edward Everett Hale)

=== Juvenile writings ===
- The Peterkin Papers, 1880
- The Last of the Peterkins with Others of Their Kin, 1886

=== Books of devotion ===
- The Struggle for Life, a Story of Home, 1861
- The Lord's Supper and its Observance, 1866
- The Service of Sorrow, 1867

=== Miscellaneous ===
- Designs in Outline for Art-Needlework, 1879
- Fagots for the Fireside (a book of games), 1888

== Interest in education ==
Hale had a lifelong interest in education. In 1874 she was one of the first women elected to the Boston School Committee, serving two terms.

She believed in the importance of kindergartens, and of having cooking and sewing classes in public schools.
