= Susan Hale =

American painter (1833–1910)

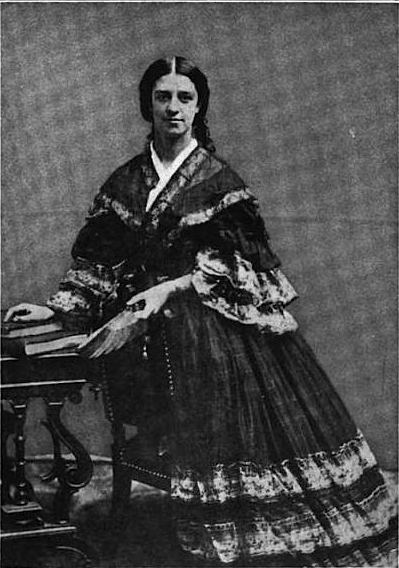
- Susan Hale, ca. 1865
- Born: December 5, 1833; Boston, Massachusetts, U.S.
- Died: September 17, 1910 (aged 76); Matunuck, Rhode Island, U.S.
- Occupations: Author, artist
- Relatives: Nathan Hale (father); Edward Everett Hale (brother); Lucretia Peabody Hale (sister); Charles Hale (brother); Edward Everett (maternal uncle); Nathan Hale (granduncle)

Susan Hale (December 5, 1833 – September 17, 1910) was an American author, traveler and artist. She was a prolific writer as well as a famous watercolor painter, art which she studied under English, French and German masters. Hale traveled extensively and visited the art galleries of the world, leading to many writings, paintings and sketches of the places she visited. She was associated with her brother, the Rev. Edward Everett Hale, in the publication of The Family Flight series, which included the several countries she had visited. She also exhibited her paintings of the White Mountains in New Hampshire, of North Carolina scenery and of foreign scenes, in New York City and Boston. She edited Life and Letters of Thomas Gold Appleton (1885), and contributed numerous articles to periodicals.

== Early life and education ==
She was born in Boston, Massachusetts to Nathan Hale and Sarah Preston Everett who had a total of seven children. Susan's father, Nathan Hale, nephew and namesake of the patriot hero, was a lawyer and editor/owner of the Boston Daily Advertiser while her mother was also an author, translator and helped in editorial tasks. Her mother was a sister of Edward Everett, a Unitarian minister and politician. Growing up as the youngest of seven, Susan was mostly the companion of her older sister Lucretia, who also was a writer and a painter.

She was educated privately by tutors until she was 16, and then entered the school of George Barrell Emerson. Without any particular teaching, she learned to draw and to paint early in life, being highly influenced by her family's artistic endeavours.

== Professional career and travels ==
Susan Hale did not follow conventional feminine standards of the time as she did not marry nor dedicated herself to domestic affairs. She, instead, travelled and devoted her life to intellectual matters like literature, theatre and painting, becoming a lecturer, amateur actress, author of many literaty works such as monologues, ficcion writings or travel literature, and a watercolor painter. Among her interests, she also practiced physical excersice on the street, swam in a lake near her home, rode horses and went canoeing. Her professional and leisure interests were definitely groundbreaking for a woman in the 19th century.

For many years, she was a successful teacher in Boston. She started this occupation when her father became ill and the family income needed to be supplemented. In 1860, she moved to Brookline with her family. Her father died there in 1862 and her mother in 1865. When the family situation broke up in 1867, Susan and her sister Lucretia went abroad to stay with their brother Charles who was consul general of the United States in Egypt. On returning from abroad, Susan took rooms at 91 Boylston Street in Boston and continued her teaching.

In 1872, she decided she wanted to get the best training in watercolor she could, and went abroad again and studied art in Paris, France, and Weimar, Germany, for nearly a year. When she returned in 1873, she began giving lessons in watercolors. She lived and maintained a studio in the Art Club at 64 Boylston Street. Later, she began holding meetings where she read or talked to people.

=== Travel to Spain ===
Not wanting to give up her love for travelling, she visited Spain in 1882 with her brother Edward Everett Hale, his daughter, Elen Day Hale, and a family friend, Mrs. Mary Manquard. The group could travel easily through the country thanks to great improvements on the railway, which connected the main cities of the country. This was not the first time Hale travelled abroad, but the fact that she was accompanied by her brother during her visit to Spain offered her security and better social regard. However, Hale did travel alone in many occasions and stayed in rented rooms, showing her feminine agency and independence.

In Spain, Hale found a complex artistic landscape: Romanticism giving way to Realism and Costumbrismo (a predominantly Spanish style focused on custom and manners). Yet, Hale's writings are clearly Romantic. The author reflected in her texts the picturesque, the old and the mythical, and Spain, as many other Romantic travellers and writers had already affirmed, was the ideal place to find this artistic landscape. Hale's attitude towards her time in Spain was open-minded, seeking to integrate herself in the culture by learning the language to communicate with Spaniards, eating the typical and ordinary food, and discovering the country from within, without letting foreign clichés or stereotypes influence her perception.

Here, she wrote A Family Flight Through Spain in 1883, a travel book which chronicles a family's travels through Spain. Hale narrates probably from her personal experience in the country, describing various locations in Spain, cultural insights on societal norms and daily life at the time.

=== Back to the US ===
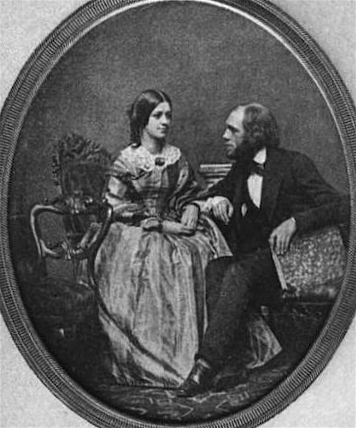
Susan and brother, Edward Everett Hale (l-r)

In 1885, she began to keep house at the summer home of her brother, Edward, in Matunuck, Rhode Island, which she called home until her death in 1910. Her brother and his wife had gone abroad to look after their sick daughter. Susan eventually moved most of her things to Matunuck, and began to spend time there regularly during summers. During winters, she traveled. In earlier years, she had spent winters working in Boston and traveled in the summer, sometimes accompanying well-known friends such as Thomas Gold Appleton and Frederic Edwin Church. She continued visiting Boston between her travels abroad and her stays at Matunuck. Her watercolors were mostly landscapes done during her travels; she also described her travels in vivid detail in letters to her sister, Lucretia.

Hale died at her summer home in Matunuck, in 1910.

== Works ==
Susan Hale's literary production was quite prolific and varied. Generally, it reflected her desire to engage in something different, hoping to subvert women's situation at the time. Yet, she was obviously influenced by the English colonizer society surrounding her and to avoid falling into clichés or stereotypes imposed by it was certainly a challenge.

Hale knew exactly what her limitations were and this is probably a reason why many of the books she wrote alongside her brother Edward about their travels were first published only under his name. However, Hale's life shows a continuous questioning of the traditional Victorian role for women and this shows in her literary production, specially in her letters. Also, the fact that she took up on travel literature, like in A Family Flight Through Spain, is revolutionary because it did not fit the standard genres associated with women.

A Family Flight Through Spain was a travel writing she published about her time in Spain, a fictitious novel with real elements from her personal experience. She writes this novel with a respectful and kind tone and depicts Spaniards as equals (or similar) to Americans and not as an inferior country. Yet, as it was mentioned, Hale was challenged by colonialist conceptions and failed to completely detach herself and her writings from it. These colonialist impressions intrude in descriptions of Spanish manners or landscapes, for instance characterizing Spain as "the land of romance and sunshine." However respectful and groundbreaking, Hale's perception of Spain was ultimately as an old-fashioned Spain anchored in the past, as opposed to the idea of progress, future and opportunity represented by the US.

== Selected works ==
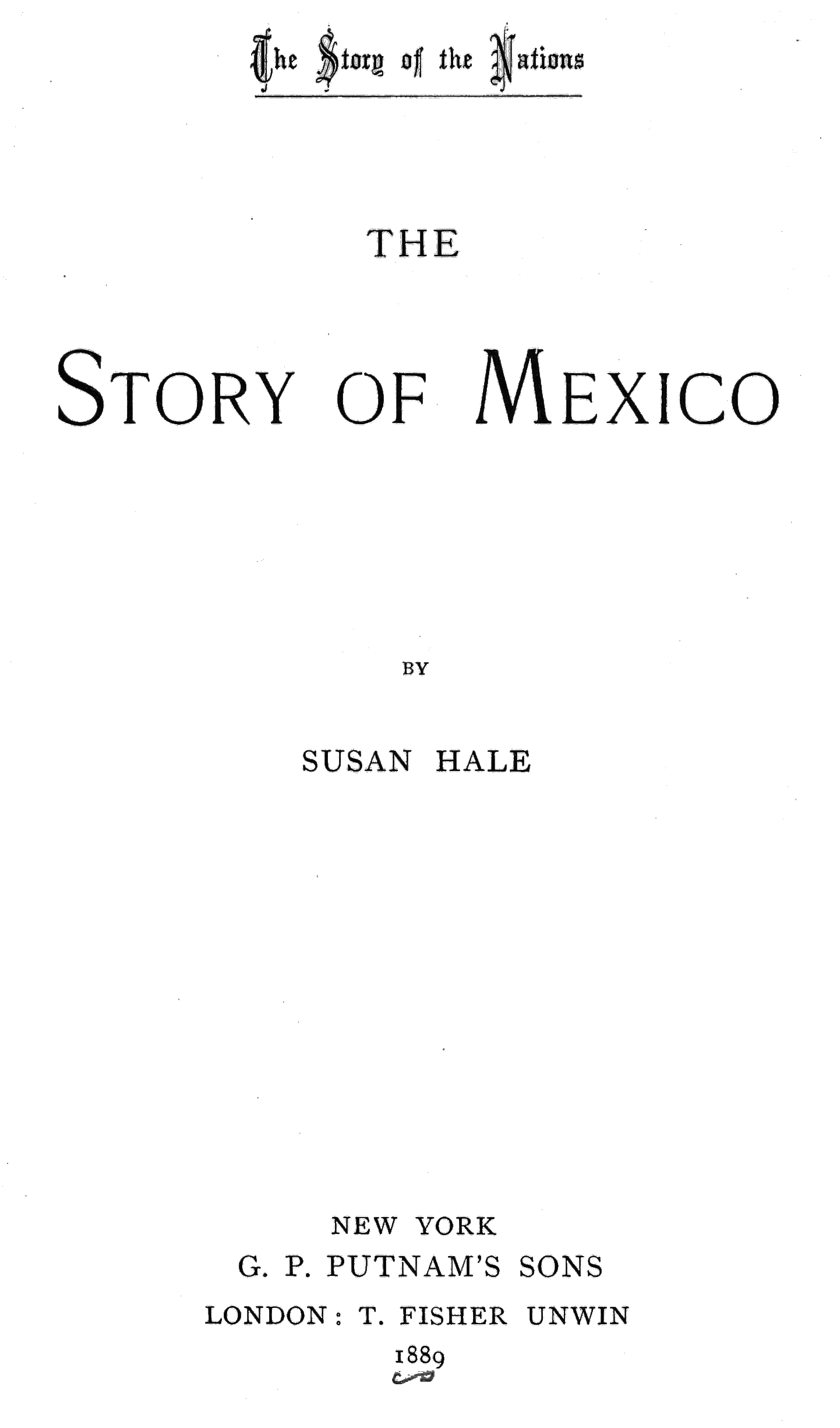
The Story of Mexico (1889)

- A Family Flight through France, Germany, Norway and Switzerland. 1881 (with Edward Everett Hale)
- A Family Flight over Egypt and Syria. 1882 (with Edward Everett Hale)
- A Family Flight through Spain. 1883
- Self-Instructive Lessons in Painting with Oil and Water-Colors on Silk, Satin, Velvet, and Other Fabrics Including Lustra Painting and the Use of Other Mediums. 1885
- Men and Manners of the Eighteenth Century. 1898
- Addison and Gay. 1898
- Young Americans in Spain. 1899
- Letters of Susan Hale. 1919
- Nonsense Book; A Collection of Limericks. 1919
- Inklings for Thinklings. 1919
