= Francis H. Jenks =

American theater critic (1838–1894)

Francis Henry Jenks
- Born: June 2, 1838; Nantucket, Massachusetts
- Died: December 9, 1894; Roxbury, Massachusetts
- Education: Boston Latin School (1851).
- Spouse: Julia M. Clark (m. March 20, 1865, d. February 24, 1919).
- Children: Edwin M. Jenks

Francis Henry Jenks (June 2, 1838 – December 9, 1894) was a 19th-century theater critic in Boston whose work appeared in the Boston Globe, The Boston Daily Advertiser, The Boston Courier and The Boston Evening Transcript newspapers, The New England magazine, Grove Dictionary of Music and Musicians, and other publications.

Jenks was music and dramatic editor of The Boston Evening Transcript from 1881 to 1894. Jenks donated a number of theater-related items to the collection of the Boston Athenæum.
