= Christian Examiner =

American periodical (1813–1869)

The Christian Examiner
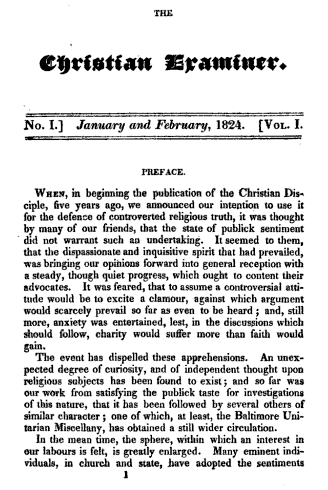
- Categories: Christian journal
- Founded: 1813
- Final issue: 1869
- Country: US
- Based in: Boston

The Christian Examiner was an American periodical published between 1813 and 1869.

== History and profile ==
Founded in 1813 as The Christian Disciple, it was purchased in 1814 by Nathan Hale. His son Edward Everett Hale later oversaw publication. Ralph Waldo Emerson's first printed work, "Thoughts on the Religion of the Middle Ages", signed "H.O.N.", was published in The Christian Disciple in 1822.

Through the years, editors included: William Ellery Channing; Noah Worcester; Henry Ware Jr.; John Gorham Palfrey; Francis Jenks, and others. An important journal of liberal Christianity, it was influential in the Unitarian and Transcendentalist movements. It ceased publication in 1869 when it was subsumed by a new Unitarian periodical edited by Edward Everett Hale and called Old and New.
