= Cornelia Walter =

American newspaper editor (1815–1898)

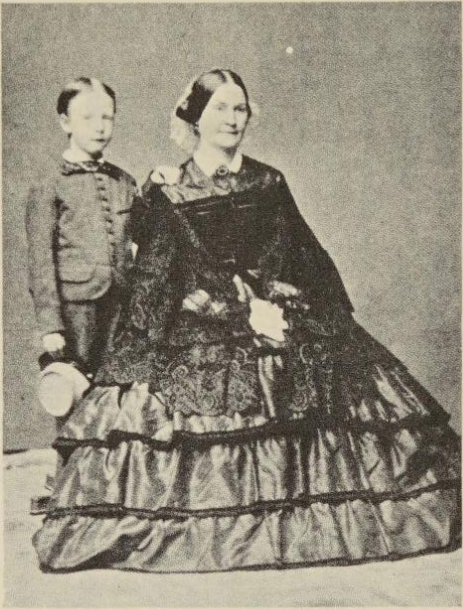
- Born: June 7, 1815; Boston
- Died: January 31, 1898 (aged 82); Boston
- Occupation: Editor

Cornelia Wells Walter (June 7, 1815 – January 31, 1898) is generally considered to have been the first woman editor of a major newspaper in the United States.

== Biography ==
Walter was the fourth and youngest child of Lynde Walter, a Boston merchant, and his second wife, Ann Minshull.

Her brother Lynde Walter was one of the founders of the Boston Evening Transcript in 1830. Originally the paper's theater critic, at age 29 she became the editor of the Transcript, taking over the position from her brother upon his death in 1842. She served as editor from 1842 to 1847.

Under Walter, the Transcript reflected the conservative tastes of upper class Bostonians. She opposed slavery and praised Frederick Douglass, but also chided abolitionists and published articles against abolition. She criticized authors who were later firmly embraced by the literary canon, such as James Russell Lowell, Ralph Waldo Emerson, and Edgar Allan Poe. In 1845, she began a vicious war of words with Poe that raised her to national prominence.

In September 1847, she retired from the paper to marry William Bordman Richards, a Boston iron and steel merchant. They lived in a fashionable Boston neighborhood and had two children who survived infancy. She occasionally contributed to the Transcript and published the book Mount Auburn Illustrated (1847) about Mount Auburn Cemetery.
