= Boston Weekly Messenger =

1811–1861 newspaper in Massachusetts, US

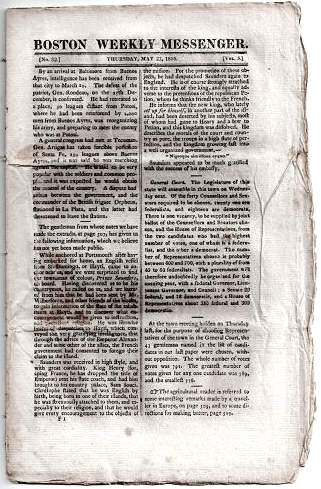
Boston Weekly Messenger, 1816

The Boston Weekly Messenger (1811–1861) was a newspaper in Boston, Massachusetts, in the 19th century. Publishers/editors included James Cutler and Nathan Hale. It began as "a political journal, established in 1811 by a company of young federalists, chief among whom was John Lowell." It consisted "largely of current news taken from the Boston Daily Advertiser;" the two papers shared an office at no.6 Congress Street.

== Variant titles ==
- The Weekly Messenger, 1811–1815
- Boston Weekly Messenger, 1815–1832, 1833–1861
- Boston Weekly Messenger and Massachusetts Journal, 1832–1833
