= John A. Goodwin =

American politician

John Abbot Goodwin

Speaker of the Massachusetts House of Representatives
- In office 1860–1861
- Preceded by: Charles Hale
- Succeeded by: Alexander H. Bullock

Member of the Massachusetts House of Representatives
- In office 1859–1861

Member of the Massachusetts House of Representatives
- In office 1859–1861

Personal details
- Born: May 21, 1824 Sterling, Massachusetts
- Died: September 24, 1884 (aged 60)
- Spouse: Martha Fisher
- Children: William Bradford Goodwin
- Profession: Educator, journalist

John Abbot Goodwin (1824-1884) was an American educator, journalist, author and politician who served as a member, and from 1860 to 1861, as the Speaker of the Massachusetts House of Representatives.

== Family life ==
Goodwin was the brother of American writer Jane G. Austin. Goodwin married Martha Fisher of Sudbury, Massachusetts, they had a son, William Bradford Goodwin.

== Teaching career ==
Goodwin was a teacher for many years and authored the book The Pilgrim Republic: An historical review of the colony of New Plymouth, which was well received upon its publication. Goodwin was for a time the superintendent of schools of Lawrence, Massachusetts.

== Journalist career ==
Goodwin was involved in the management of the Lawrence Courier. In 1854 Goodwin moved to Lowell to take over the running of the Lowell Courier. After working for a year at the Courier Goodwin became the editor of the Lowell Daily Citizen and News. Goodwin spent two tears as editor of the Daily Citizen and News.

== Public service career ==
Goodwin was a member of the Lowell Board of Aldermen for two years, and spent ten consecutive years as a member of the Lowell School Committee. Goodwin was a member of the Massachusetts House of Representatives in 1857 and 1859 to 1861, serving as House Speaker for his last two years.

== Lowell Postmaster ==
On April 12, 1861 Goodwin received an appointment from President Lincoln to the position of postmaster of Lowell, a position that he held for thirteen years.

== Death and burial ==
Goodwin died on September 24, 1884, he was buried in the cemetery in south Sudbury, Massachusetts

Massachusetts House of Representatives
Preceded by Charles Hale	Speaker of the Massachusetts House of Representatives; 1860 — 1861	Succeeded by Alexander H. Bullock
