= Myth of the First Thanksgiving =

Piece of American folklore

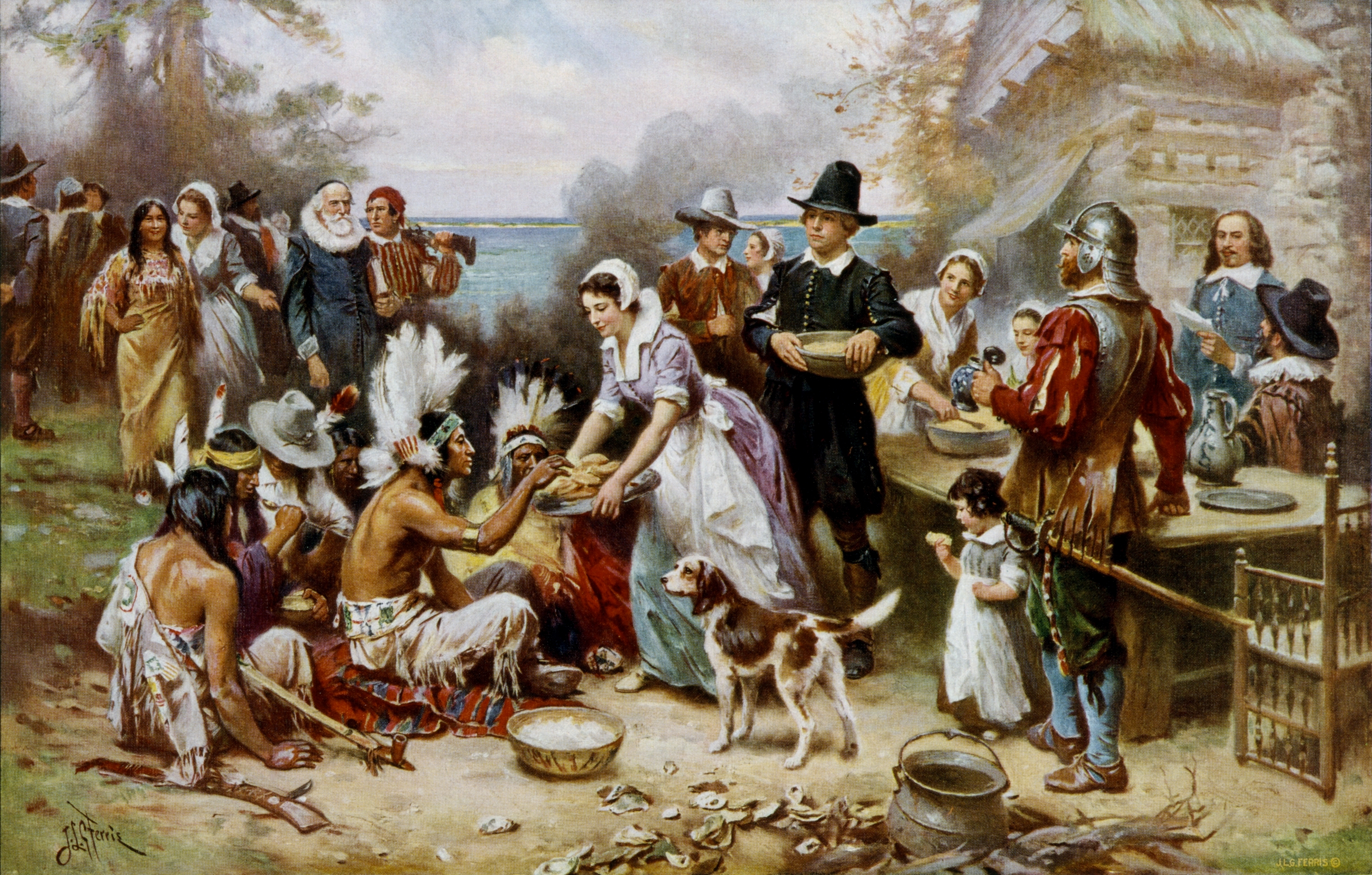
The First Thanksgiving 1621, oil on canvas by Jean Leon Gerome Ferris (1899). A fictionalized depiction of the traditional "First Thanksgiving" in which the Wampanoag anachronistically wear Plains tribes' headdresses, the Pilgrims wear contemporary cowboy hats and at least five Pilgrim women are present (only four had survived the previous winter).

The myth of the First Thanksgiving, also called Thanksgiving myth, is the mythologized retelling of a 1621 harvest feast by the Pilgrims in Plymouth, Massachusetts as the foundation for the modern Thanksgiving holiday as celebrated in the United States. This description of events has been criticized by both Indigenous peoples of the United States and academic scholars for how it obfuscates history. In particular, the relationships between the Pilgrims and the Indigenous people of the region are misrepresented. Many modern day Thanksgiving foods were also not eaten at the feast as assumed, and the aftermath of the event is usually ignored.

== Myth ==
Historian David Silverman describes the myth of the First Thanksgiving as such: "The myth is that friendly Indians, unidentified by tribe, welcome the Pilgrims to America, teach them how to live in this new place, sit down to dinner with them and then disappear".

In its traditional telling, the myth begins with the Pilgrims leaving England on the Mayflower in search of religious freedom. Once the Pilgrims landed, they met the local Indigenous people (primarily the Wampanoag), with whom they had a warm, friendly, and "faithful" relationship, with the settlers requiring Wampanoag assistance to survive, which they provided out of the goodness of their hearts. In truth, Wampanoag leader Ousamequin was the one to initiate contact with the settlers in March 1621, after a time of wary avoidance; the Wampanoag had previous negative experiences with European fishermen, some of whom had captured individuals as slaves. The relationship was political, rather than being based on interpersonal relationships, with the Wampanoag hoping an alliance with the settlers would allow them access to trade and help them fight against the Narragansett people. This alliance was also not universally approved of, with individual Wampanoag challenging the idea that the alliance was a good idea. The Pilgrims primarily maintained an alliance with the Wampanoag in order to have access to resources.

The winter of late 1620 into early 1621 was particularly harsh for the English settlers, with many of them dying. The settlers were able to prepare for the next winter with the help of Tisquantum, usually called Squanto in the myth, but what is usually not mentioned is that Tisquantum had been abducted by the crew of an English ship in 1614 and sold into slavery in Spain. He escaped from slavery and made his way to England, learning English there before returning to North America in 1619. When he returned, his tribe had been ravaged by what was originally thought to be smallpox but was more likely leptospirosis. The Pilgrims had built Plymouth on the area where his village had been, as the land was already cleared.

=== 1621 feast ===
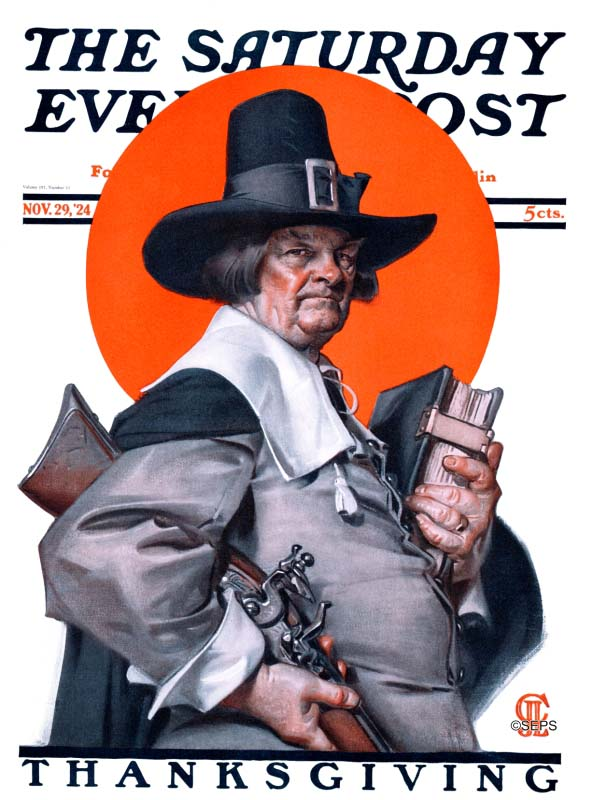
A 1924 magazine depiction of a Pilgrim. The buckle hat atop his head, an iconic symbol of the Pilgrims in the myth, never existed as a serious piece of clothing.

According to the myth, the First Thanksgiving was celebrated for 3 days, with local Native Americans in attendance as guests, as a way to give thanks for each other's presence and contributions. Historians are unsure if the settlers invited the Native Americans. Some accounts suggest that Wampanoag men came to the settlement after hearing celebratory gunfire, fearing the settlement was under attack. Other historians think their presence might have been coincidence, with Wampanoag leader Massasoit happening to visit the settlement on diplomatic grounds that day, or that Wampanoag people had been planting near the settlement on that day.

Furthermore, artistic renditions tend to feature only a few Native Americans in attendance, when in truth the event had about 90 Wampanoag visitors compared to the 50 settlers. It is true that both the English settlers and Wampanoag people ate together, and there were prayers and games.

Many artistic renditions of the 1621 events portray the members of the community in black and gray clothing; these clothes, however, would have been principally worn on Sundays (such dark colors were more associated with the Puritans). The Pilgrims wore colorful clothing on weekdays, just as their contemporaries in England would have. The settlers also would not have worn buckles on their shoes or capotains.

==== Foods eaten ====
The myth of the First Thanksgiving often attaches modern day Thanksgiving foods to the 1621 event.

Turkey is commonly portrayed as a centerpiece of the First Thanksgiving meal, although it is not mentioned in primary sources, and historian Godfrey Hodgson suggests turkey would have been rare in New England at the time and difficult for the Pilgrims to hunt with their available weapons. This claim has been disputed by the curators of Plimoth Patuxet, the museum which teaches the history of Plymouth Colony.

Although pie is commonly associated with modern Thanksgiving celebrations, it would not have been present at the 1621 event due to the lack of butter or wheat flour. Similarly, potatoes would not have been brought to New England yet. Foods like pecans and sweet potatoes would not have been present, as they came from southern celebrations starting in the late 19th century.

Primary accounts suggest that the feast included crops harvested by the Plymouth settlers, fowl hunted by the settlers, and five deer, which were brought by the Wampanoag. Historians think the deer would have been processed into stew. Cornmeal, succotash, pumpkin, and cranberries may have also been served. Seafood was also among the foods served. Accounts of a more exaggerated dinner with confections that would have been impossible given the supplies at hand were popularized by author Jane G. Austin in her extensive writings of Pilgrim fiction in the 1880s; Austin's stories relied on family lore and imaginative writing as much as the historical record.

=== Aftermath ===
The myth does not often explore the aftermath of the 1621 event, supposing simply that the friendship between the colonists and Native Americans led to a peace that allowed the New England Colonies to continue to thrive. The Wampanoag–Plymouth alliance would indeed hold for roughly five decades, most prominently in the late 1630s when they, the Narragansett, and other native tribes and colonies united to annihilate the Pequot in the Pequot War. Massasoit died in 1661 and his son Metacomet (King Philip) assumed the chiefdom in 1662. The alliance slowly collapsed in the early 1670s ahead of the outbreak of King Philip's War in 1675.

In 1623, the Plymouth colonists held a day of thanksgiving in response to rains after drought and the arrival of Captain Miles Standish, making this the first day of thanksgiving identified as such in primary sources in the Plymouth Bay Colony.

== History of the myth ==
=== Background ===
The English academic Godfrey Hodgson suggested in his 2006 book A Great and Godly Adventure: The Pilgrims and the Myth of the First Thanksgiving that calling the 1621 harvest feast a thanksgiving feast would be inaccurate, as although the Pilgrims did celebrate days of thanksgiving, the 1621 event is not referred to as such in any primary documents. Additionally, days of Thanksgiving had been recorded elsewhere on the continent prior to the 1621 event, including Spanish Florida in 1565, Newfoundland in 1578, Popham Colony in what is now Maine in 1607, and Jamestown in 1607 and 1610.

Two primary accounts of the 1621 event exist; one is by Edward Winslow, and one by William Bradford. Neither account refers to the event as a day of thanksgiving or a celebration of thanksgiving. Furthermore, the Plymouth settlers were not viewed as "the fathers of America" until the 1760s, when a group of Pilgrim descendants began to push that idea.

Various days of thanksgiving were held in New England throughout the 17th and 18th centuries, and were largely church based, with a community feast at the end of a full day of fasting. Often these days were held in late November, to mark the end of the agricultural year. Over time, communities in New England began to hold thanksgiving days twice annually in the spring and autumn, with fasting less strictly observed. Traditions such as family reunions and balls emerged, with turkey and pumpkin being commonly eaten foods at Thanksgiving meals. At the time, the holiday was much more associated with winter motifs, and would remain so until Christmas became more popular in the United States in the mid-19th century.

The first national day of thanksgiving in the United States was declared by George Washington in 1789, but he did not connect this day to the 1621 event, nor was this meant as an annual occurrence. Momentum for inclusion of Plymouth in the founding myths of the United was provided by the influence of the Old Colony Club, who feared that Plymouth was being overshadowed by events in other colonies, including the American Revolution.

=== 19th and 20th century ===
According to historians at Plimoth Patuxet, the 1621 event was not called "the First Thanksgiving" until the 1830s, more than two centuries after the original event. In 1841, a publishing of Winslow's account by Reverend Alexander Young noted that it was "the First Thanksgiving, the harvest festival of New England". This 1841 publication is thought to have truly popularized the idea of the 1621 event as the First Thanksgiving.

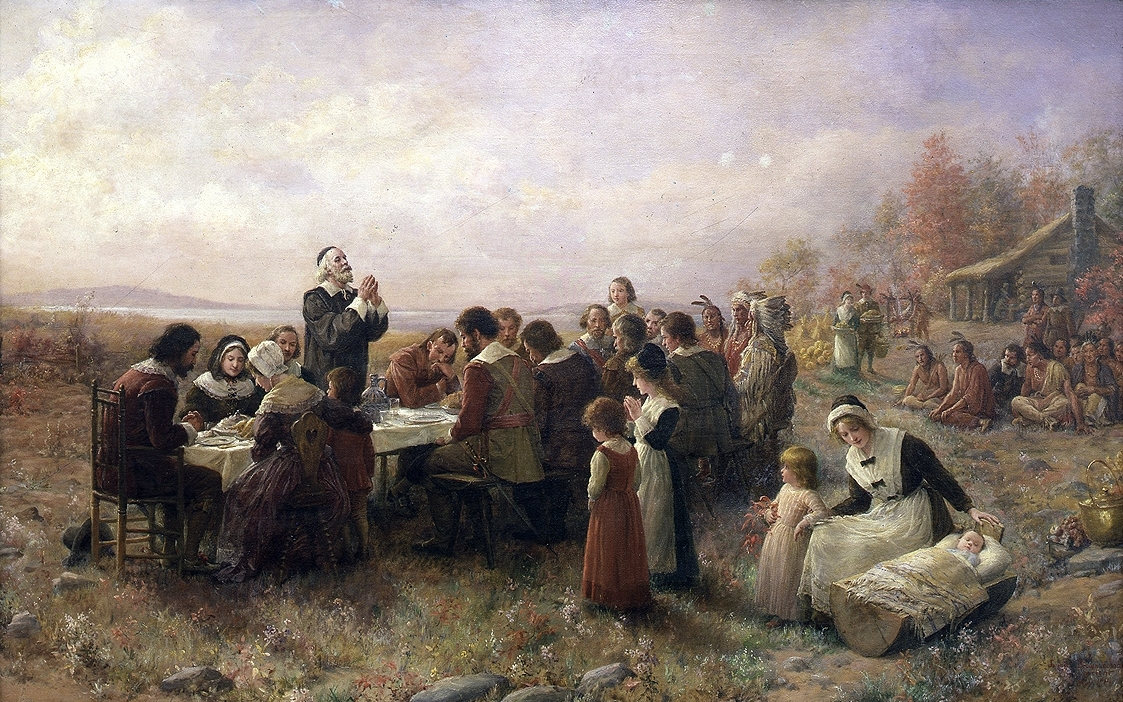
"The First Thanksgiving at Plymouth" (1914) By Jennie A. Brownscombe

In the 1840s, American writer Sarah Josepha Hale read an account of the 1621 event, connected the feast to contemporary Thanksgiving celebrations, and began advocating for a national Thanksgiving holiday in 1846. She wrote letters to presidents Zachary Taylor, Millard Fillmore, Franklin Pierce, and James Buchanan, but it was her letter to Abraham Lincoln that inspired him to declare a national Thanksgiving Day, which he hoped would unify the country in the midst of the Civil War. It was Hale who popularized what is now seen as the classic Thanksgiving menu, publishing recipes for turkey and pumpkin pie in Godey's Lady's Book.

Artistic representations of the event did not become common until the early 20th century. The 19th-century depictions that do exist often include depictions of violence between the colonists and Native Americans, which may have been influenced by the ongoing Indian Wars. In other examples, such as an 1857 rendition by American painter Edwin White which includes Native Americans "shooting at a mark," seemingly as part of an archery contest, but otherwise show peaceful interactions between Native Americans and the Pilgrims.

The myth of the First Thanksgiving remained on the periphery of the holiday until 1889, when Jane G. Austin's Standish of Standish was published. The novel was a fictionalized narrative following the early years of the Plymouth Colony, and it became a bestseller. The novel includes a "sentimental account of the 'First Thanksgiving' centered on an outdoor feast" (emphasis author), during which Massasoit prayed that the "Great Spirit" would allow the colonists to prosper and kill the colonists' enemies. Now popularized, the myth also presented a more appealing reason for the Thanksgiving holiday, as a commemorative occasion of an important American historical event, rather than a more religious, and specifically Calvinist, occasion.

The myth continued to evolve in the late 19th century, when it was used by white Protestant Americans in response to their fears over immigration by Catholics and Jews, as the myth allowed them to claim that Protestants had been given the land the United States now claimed. The myth also allowed New Englanders to claim that the founding of their region had been done bloodlessly, as opposed to the slavery of the south and the Indian Wars of the west.

In the 1880s and 1890s, journals such as the Journal of Education published lesson plans to teach the history of Thanksgiving, some of which connected the 1621 event to older Thanksgiving celebrations, including those of ancient Greece and Rome, the Jewish holiday of Sukkot, and the English Harvest Home, and comparing the Mayflower passengers to the Jews fleeing Egypt in the Biblical Book of Exodus. In one 1884 plan, Thanksgiving is said to be set apart from these holidays because "it is not a day of boisterous hilarity and celebration but a devout outpouring of thanks from a God-fearing people for blessings received during the year," specifically because of its origin in the 1621 event.

It was not until Franklin D. Roosevelt's Thanksgiving proclamation in 1939 that the holiday and the 1621 event were explicitly connected by a president, and the myth and holiday were not fully linked until after World War II.

In 1963, President John F. Kennedy started his Thanksgiving proclamation with the words "Over three centuries ago, our forefathers in Virginia and in Massachusetts, far from home in a lonely wilderness, set aside a time of thanksgiving," but did not identify the Massachusetts "time of thanksgiving" with the 1621 event.

Time magazine published an article titled "The Pilgrims: Unshakeable Myth" in November 1970, in which they credited the mythological retelling of the 1621 events to "19th century romantics".

== Reactions ==
In 1970, a native American advocacy group led by activist Wamsutta Frank James organized the first National Day of Mourning, held on the same day as Thanksgiving, after James was forbidden from giving an accusatory speech at Plymouth's Thanksgiving ceremonies that year that organizers anticipated would have drawn a hostile reaction.

In the 21st century, scholars and historians have continued to try to disprove the myth and to teach the history of the early New England colonies more accurately.
