= Sarah Preston Hale =

American diarist, columnist and newspaper publisher

Sarah Preston Everett Hale
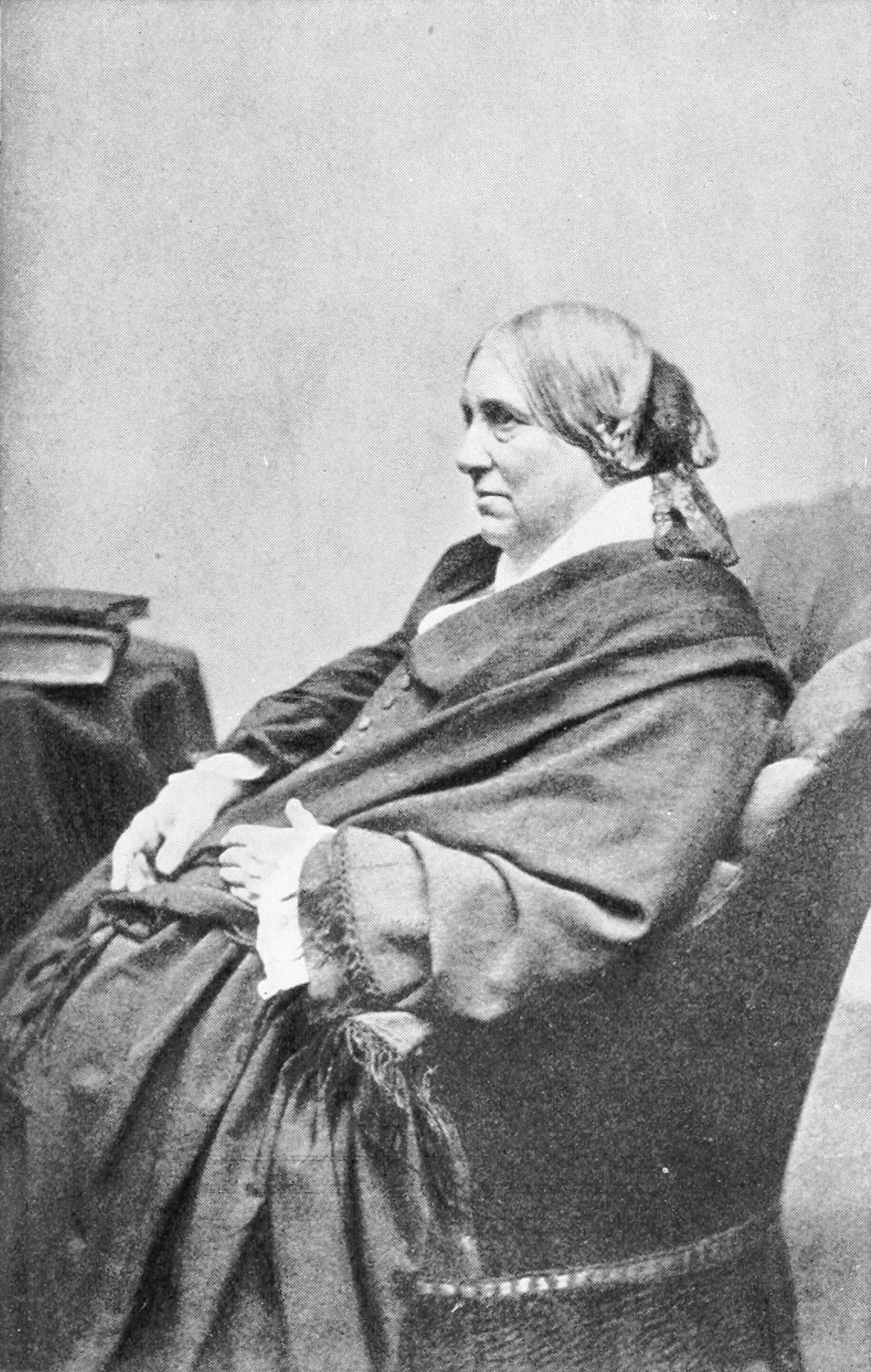
- Born: Sarah Preston Everett; 5 September 1796; Massachusetts
- Died: 14 November 1866 (aged 70); Massachusetts

Sarah Preston Everett Hale (5 September 1796 – 14 November 1866) was an American diarist, translator, columnist and newspaper publisher.

== Biography ==
Born in Dorchester, Massachusetts, 1796 Sarah Preston Everett was the daughter of the Reverend Oliver Everett and Lucy Hill. When Hale's father died in 1802, her mother moved the family to Boston. Hale's brother became the politician Edward Everett while she married lawyer Nathan Hale and with him published the Boston Daily Advertiser. Hales bore eleven children, though only seven survived infancy. They included the writers Lucretia Peabody Hale and Edward Everett Hale, the artist Susan Hale and politician Charles Hale. Her diaries are in the Sophia Smith Collection at Smith College. Hale's common place books contain her translations, poems and stories. Hale also created a reader entitled Boston reading lessons for primary schools, published in 1828.
