= Harriet Elizabeth Freeman =

American botanist, geologist, conservationist, and letter writer (1847-1930)

Harriet Elizabeth Freeman (13 March 1847 – 30 December 1930) was an American botanist, geologist, conservationist, and letter writer. She collaborated with writer and minister Edward Everett Hale. Letters decoded in the early twenty-first century suggest that the two had a romantic relationship that was covered up by Hale's family and biographers.

== Biography ==
Harriet Elizabeth Freeman was born on March 13, 1847, in Boston. Her parents were William Frederick Freeman and Caroline Crosby Lewis. The family moved to South End, Boston in 1861 and became members of the Second Congregational Church.

Freeman worked as treasurer for the church's ladies' charity organization, on the women's committee of the Massachusetts Indian Society, and for the Boston Fatherless and Widow's Society. She studied botany and geology at the Teacher's School of Science (a program run by the Boston Society of Natural History and the Massachusetts Institute of Technology), and was a special student at the Massachusetts Institute of Technology (then known as Boston Tech). Freeman was the first women admitted to the Appalachian Mountain Club in 1879.

In the 1880s, Freeman began working as a secretary for writer and Unitarian minister Edward Everett Hale, and the two corresponded regularly until Hale's death in 1909. Freeman was active in campaigns to protect forest lands and the rights of Native Americans, which she detailed in her letters to Hale. In the twenty-first century, historian Sara Day decoded more than 3,000 letters written between Freeman and Hale. The letters reveal the extent to which Freeman assisted Hale in writing his sermons, essays, and books, and reveal that the two had a 25-year romantic relationship, which was subsequently concealed by his family and biographers.

Freeman died in Newton, Massachusetts, on December 30, 1930.
