= Jane G. Austin =

American writer

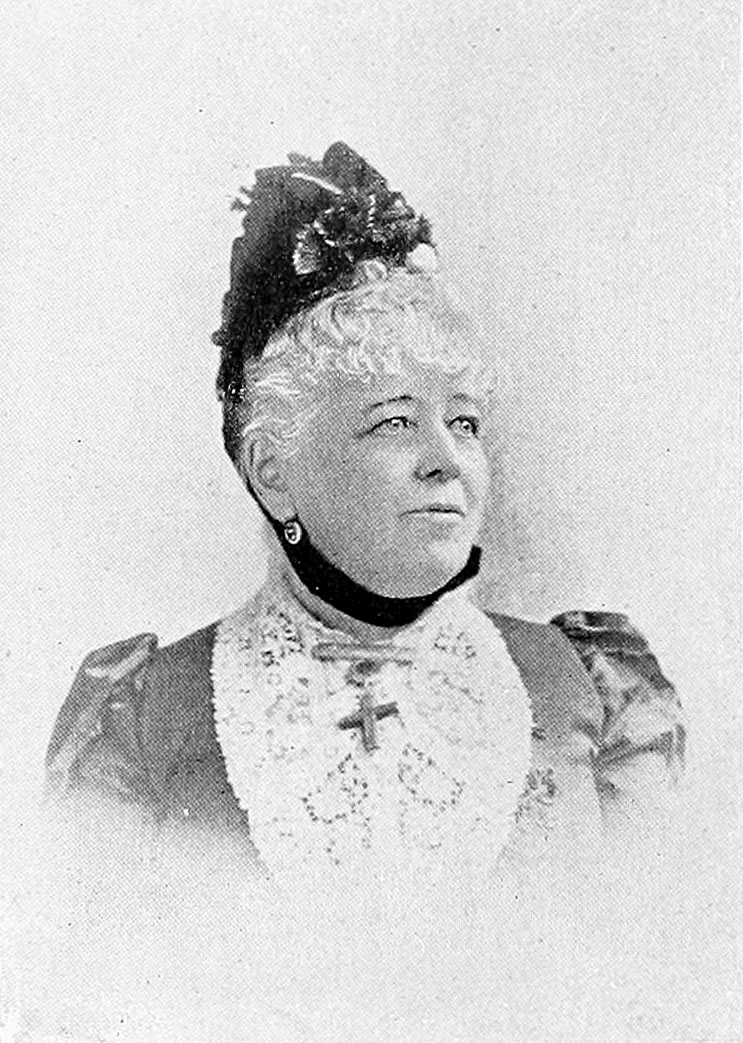
- Born: Jane Goodwin Austin; February 25, 1831; Worcester, Massachusetts, U.S.
- Died: March 30, 1894 (aged 64); Boston, Massachusetts, U.S.
- Resting place: Mt. Auburn Cemetery
- Occupation: Author
- Spouse: Loring Henry Austin (m. 1850)
- Children: Rose Standish Austin, Le Baron Loring Austin, Lilian Ivers De Silva
- Writing career
- Language: English
- Genre: Historical fiction
- Notable work: Betty Alden: the first-born daughter of the Pilgrims

Jane Goodwin Austin (February 25, 1831 – March 30, 1894) was an American writer, notable for her popular stories of the time. During her lifetime, she was the author of 24 books and numerous short stories. Her friends throughout her life were some of the most well-known American authors, including Ralph Waldo Emerson, Nathaniel Hawthorne, and Louisa May Alcott.

== Early years and education ==
Jane Goodwin was born on February 25, 1831, in Worcester, Massachusetts, to Elizabeth (Hammatt) and Isaac Goodwin. Her parents were from Plymouth and could trace eight distinct family lines back to the Pilgrims. Jane's father, a lawyer, antiquary and genealogist, died in 1833, when she was only two. Behind him, he left a large archive of historical and legal documents from the Pilgrims, the whereabouts of which are unknown today. Her brother, John A. Goodwin, wrote a book on the Pilgrims, The Pilgrim Republic. Her mother was a poet and songwriter, and told Jane many stories of her ancestors, especially of Francis Le Baron — the nameless nobleman — and his descendants. As a child, she was educated at nine different private schools in Boston.

== Career ==
Austin's first major publication was Fairy Dreams; or Wanderings in Elf-Land, in 1859. As she worked to establish her writing career during the 1860s, she published in periodicals such as Harper's, The Atlantic Monthly, Putnam's, Lippincott's, and The Galaxy. She wrote on a wide variety of topics, and may have been one of the first writers to deal with a malevolent female mummy in her story "After Three Thousand Years," which bears some similarities to her friend Louisa May Alcott's short story, "Lost in a Pyramid." Austin dedicated her 1869 novel Cipher to Louisa May Alcott to thank her for her help with its writing.

In 1869, Austin published a story titled "William Bradford's Love Life" in Harper's, in which she claimed that Dorothy Bradford, the wife of Plymouth governor William Bradford, committed suicide by jumping off the Mayflower because she believed William was in love with Alice Carpenter Southworth. Despite having no historical basis, the story caught on. Ernest Gebler told a variation of the story in his 1950 novel The Voyage of the Mayflower, which was later made into the movie the Plymouth Adventure in 1952. In Gebler's version, however, Dorothy killed herself because she fell in love with the captain of the Mayflower, Christopher Jones.

Austin's most popular works were her Pilgrim stories, for which she relied on family lore, archival research, and a creative imagination. Her historical novels, written later in her career, were published as the Pilgrims were increasingly gaining fame. Standish of Standish, for example, was published in 1889, just after the famed National Monument to the Forefathers was completed. Standish of Standish, Betty Alden, The Nameless Nobleman, and Dr. Le Baron and his Daughters, cover the era from the landing of the Pilgrims upon Plymouth Rock, in 1620 to the days of the American Revolution, in 1775. At the time of her death, she was engaged upon a story which followed the fortunes of the Aldens and others of the Plymouth Colony in the migration to Little Compton or Sakonnet Point, Rhode Island.

Nineteenth-century biographies portray her as a prolific writer who always wrote carefully and in finished style, claiming that her work was distinctly American in every essential way. However, more modern studies have begun to recognize that while Austin did engage in extensive research for her historical fiction, she also embellished her stories and as a result ensured the lasting popularity of many myths about the Pilgrims.

== Personal life ==
In 1850, she married Loring Henry Austin, a descendant of an old Boston family which figured largely in the Revolution. He was also a classmate of James Russell Lowell. She had three children.

She lived for several years in Cambridge, and then the family built a house in Lincoln, where they lived for nearly a decade until moving to Concord. Her later life was chiefly spent in Boston. She also lived with a married daughter in Roxbury, passing a part of the winter in Boston in order to be near her church, and every summer returning to Plymouth, where she constantly studied not only written records, but crumbling gravestones and oral tradition.

She was a member of the Daughters of the American Revolution and served as historian of the Massachusetts State Society.

== Selected works ==
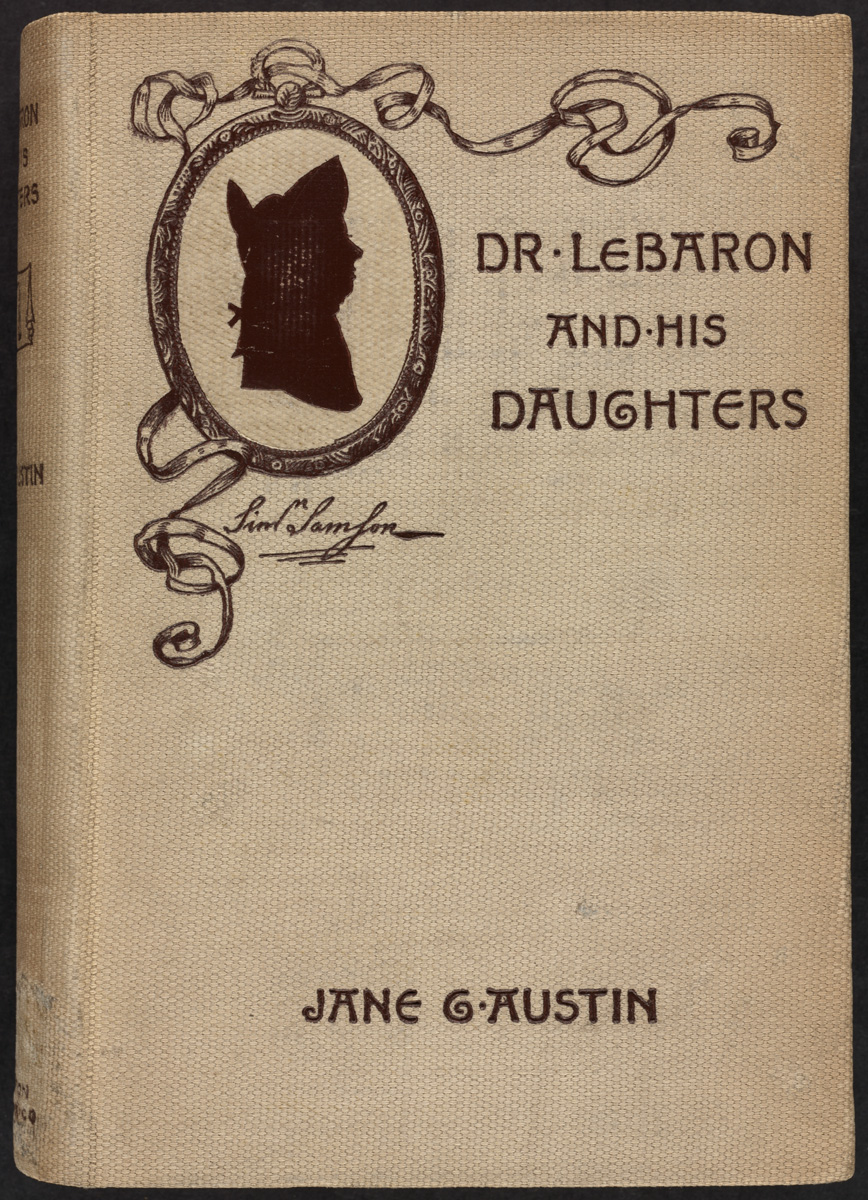
Dr. Le Baron and his daughters (1890)

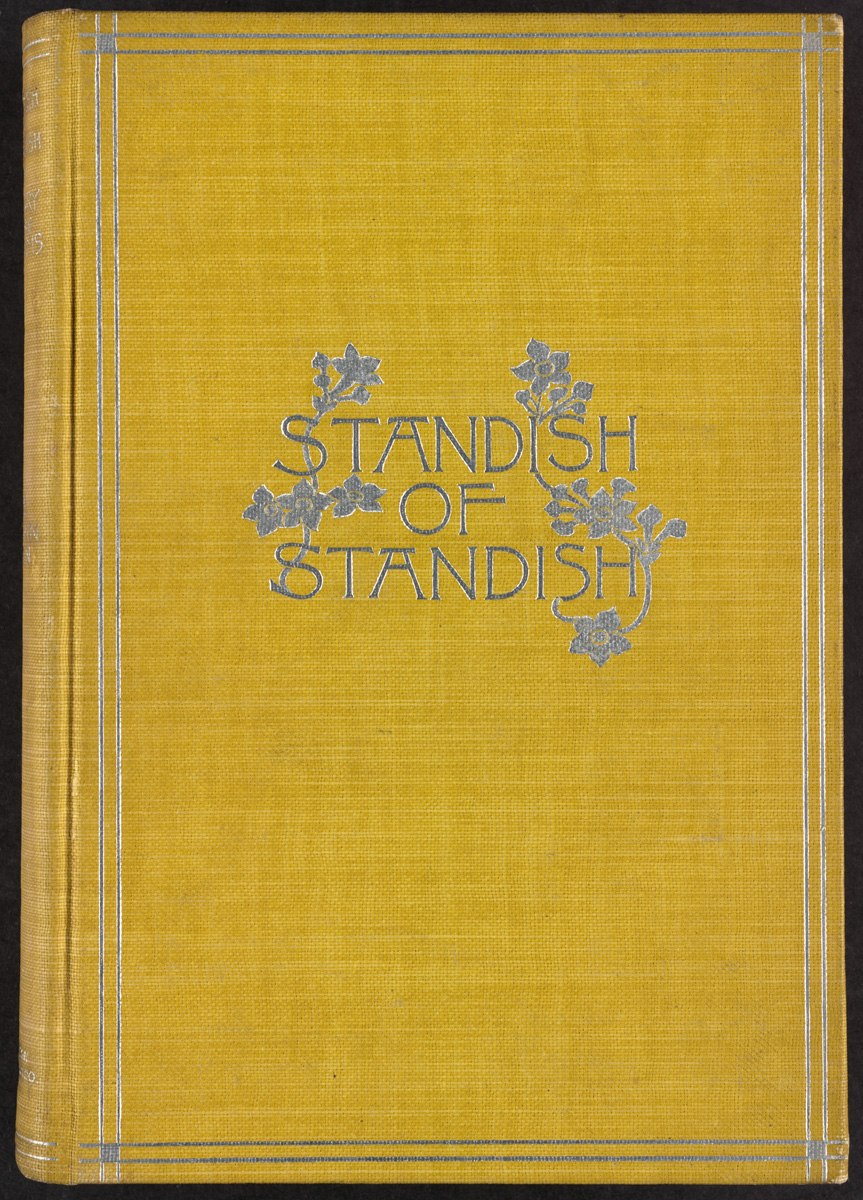
Standish of Standish (1895)

- Fairy Dreams; or, Wanderings in Elf-Land. Boston: Tilton, 1859.
- Kinah's Curse! Or, The Downfall of Carnaby Cedars. Boston: Elliott, Thomes & Talbot, 1864.
- The Tailor Boy. J. E. Tilton & Co, 1865.
- Dora Darling: The Daughter of the Regiment. Boston: Tilton, 1865.
- The Novice; or, Mother Church Thwarted. Boston: Elliott, Thomes & Talbot, 1865.
- The Outcast; or, The Master of Falcon's Eyrie. Boston: Elliott, Thomes & Talbot, 1865.
- Outpost. Boston: Tilton, 1867.
- Cipher: A Romance. New York: Sheldon, 1869.
- The Shadow of Moloch Mountain. New York: Sheldon, 1870.
- Moonfolk: A True Account of the Home of the Fairy Tales. New York: Putnam, 1874.
- Mrs. Beauchamp Brown. Boston: Roberts Brothers, 1880.
- A Nameless Nobleman. Boston: Osgood, 1881.
- The Desmond Hundred. Boston: Osgood, 1882.
- Nantucket Scraps: Being the Experiences of an Off-Islander, in Season and Out of Season, Among a Passing People. Boston: Osgood, 1883.
- The Story of a Storm. New York: Lupton, 1886.
- Standish of Standish: A Story of the Pilgrims. Boston: Houghton Mifflin, 1889.
- Dolores. New York: Lupton, 1890.
- Dr. LeBaron and His Daughters. Boston: Houghton, Mifflin, 1890.
- Betty Alden: The First Born Daughter of the Pilgrims. Boston: Houghton, Mifflin, 1891.
- David Alden's Daughter and Other Stories of Colonial Times. Boston: Houghton, Mifflin, 1892.
- It Never Did Run Smooth. New York: Lupton, 1892.
- Queen Tempest. New York: Ivers, 1892.
- The Twelve Great Diamonds. New York: Lupton, 1892.
- The Cedar Swamp Mystery. New York: Lupton, Lovell, 1901.

The titles published by Lupton were reprints of serialized novels Jane published in periodicals. Austin would not likely have received any financial compensation for the reprints.
