= Statue of Edward Everett Hale =

Statue in Boston, Massachusetts, U.S.

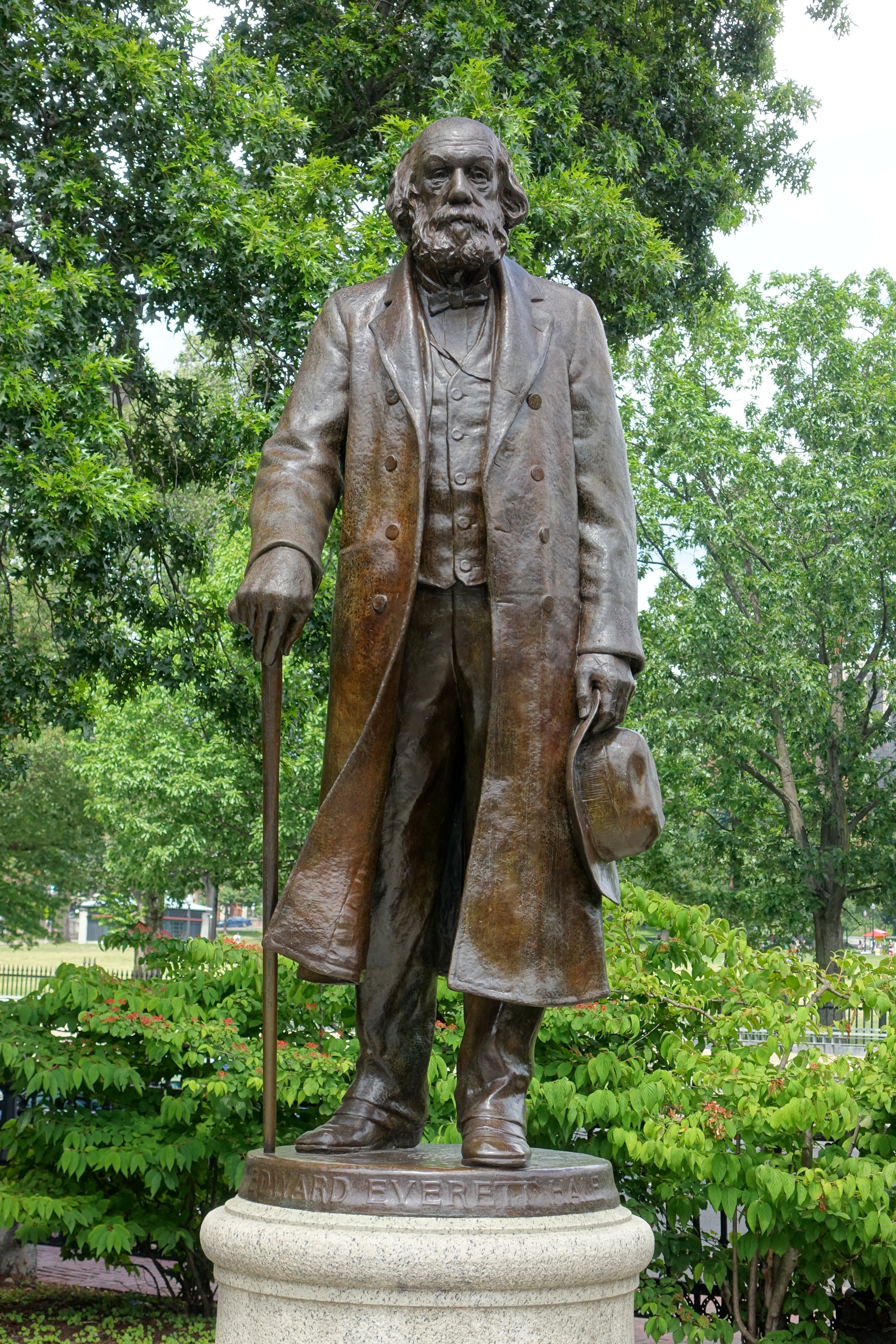
- The statue in 2017
- Artist: Bela Pratt
- Subject: Edward Everett Hale
- Location: Boston, Massachusetts, U.S.; 42°21′16.3″N 71°4′7.5″W

A statue of author, historian, and minister Edward Everett Hale by Bela Pratt is installed in Boston's Public Garden, in the U.S. state of Massachusetts. The bronze sculpture was dedicated on March 3, 1913. It was surveyed as part of the Smithsonian Institution's "Save Outdoor Sculpture!" program in 1993.
