= Edward Everett Hale House =

Historic house in Massachusetts, United States

- U.S. National Register of Historic Places
- U.S. Historic district – Contributing property
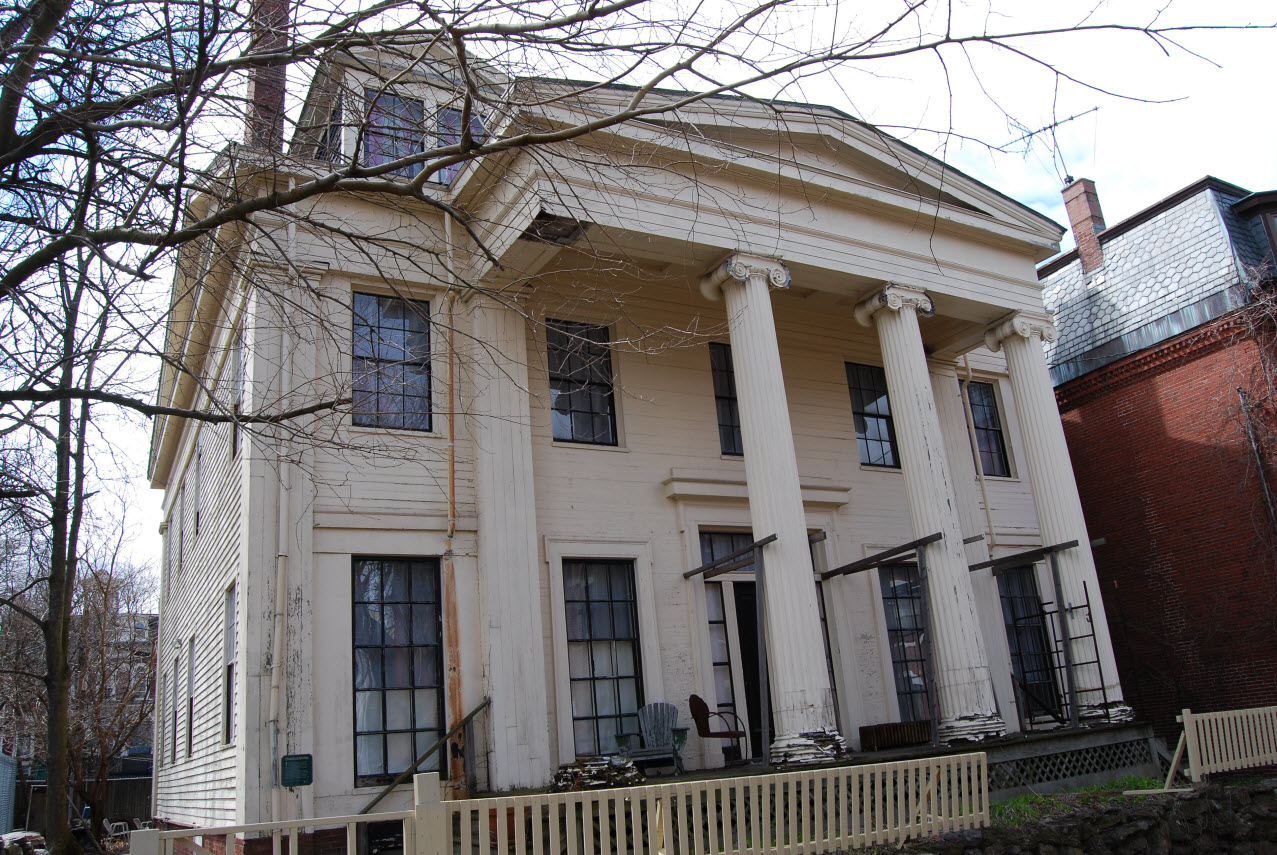

- Location within Massachusetts Location within the United States
- Location: 12 Morley Street, Roxbury, Boston, Massachusetts
- Coordinates: 42°19′44″N 71°5′33″W
- Area: less than one acre
- Built: 1841
- Built by: Kent, Benjamin
- Architectural style: Greek Revival
- Part of: Roxbury Highlands Historic District (ID89000147)
- NRHP reference No.: 73000325

Significant dates
- Added to NRHP: March 21, 1979
- Designated CP: February 22, 1989

The Edward Everett Hale House is a historic house at 12 Morley Street in Boston, Massachusetts. Built about 1841, it is a prominent local example of Greek Revival, most notable as the home of author and minister Edward Everett Hale for forty years. It was added to the National Register of Historic Places in 1979.

== Description and history ==
The Edward Everett Hale House stands on the north side of the Roxbury Highlands, on the west side of Morley Street, a dead-end residential street a short way south of John Eliot Square. It is a 2 1/2-story wood-frame structure, with a side-gable roof and a mostly clapboarded exterior. The front facade is five bays wide, with a four-column Ionic portico projecting in front of the center three bays. The columns rise to an entablature with a low-pitch triangular pediment. The entablature is continued around the sides of the building. The facade behind the portico is finished in flushboard, and the windows there have eared corner mouldings. The main entrance, at the center of the facade, is framed by sidelight and transom windows, with a corniced architrave above.

The house was built about 1841 by Benjamin Kent, a local carpenter. It was originally located at 39 Highland Street, just around the corner from its present location, and is one of Boston's finer examples of high-style Greek Revival architecture. It was moved here sometime between 1899 and 1906 by Edward Everett Hale. Hale, a prominent writer and minister, made this his home from 1869 until his death in 1909.

== See also ==
- Hale House, Hale's summer residence
- National Register of Historic Places listings in southern Boston, Massachusetts
