= Nathan Hale (journalist) =

American newspaper publisher (1784–1863)

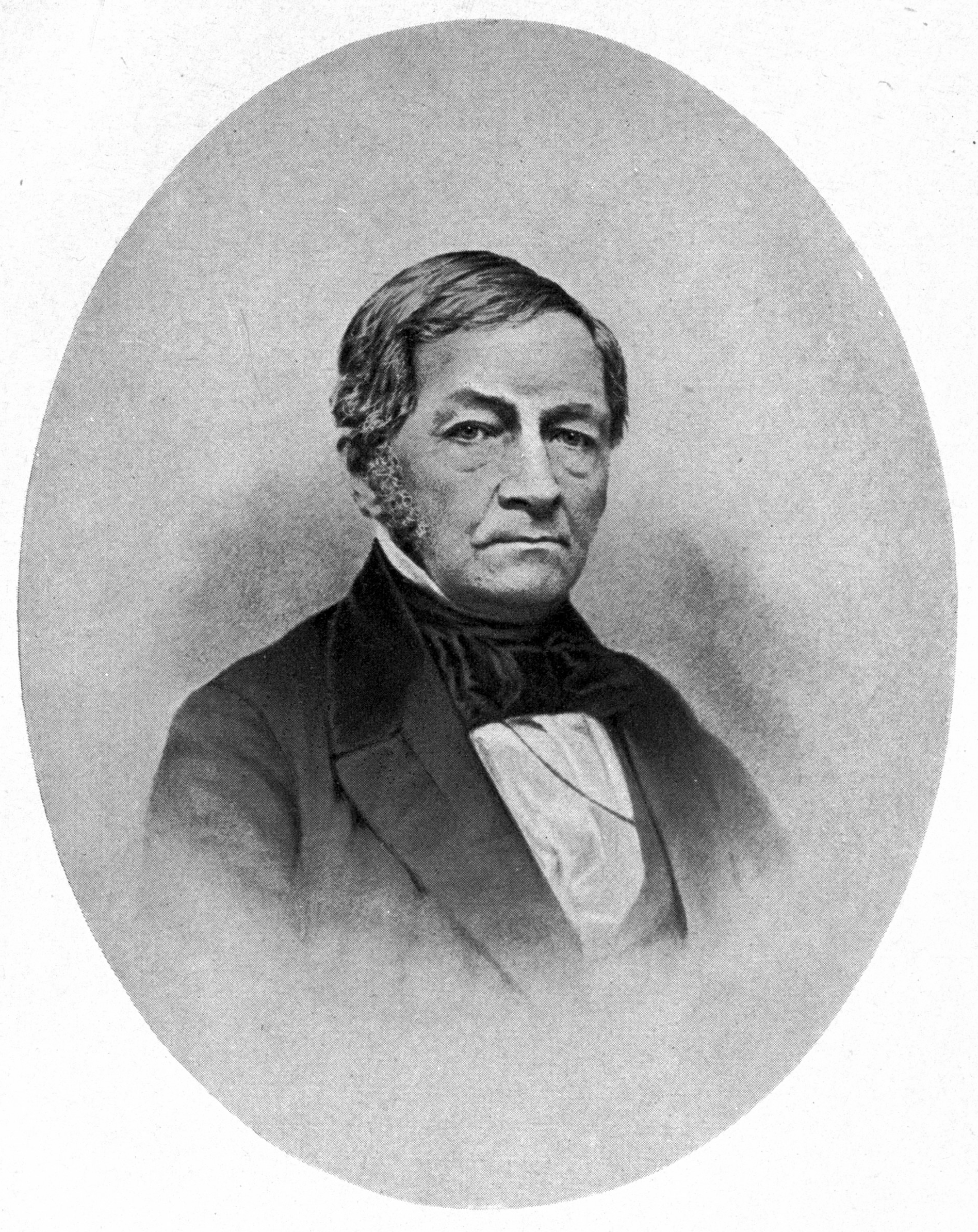
Nathan Hale

Nathan Hale (16 August 1784 – 9 February 1863) was an American journalist and newspaper publisher who introduced regular editorial comment as a newspaper feature.

== Life and career ==
Born in Westhampton, Massachusetts, Hale graduated from Williams College in 1804, and then was a tutor for two years at Phillips Exeter Academy. He moved to Boston, where he was admitted to the bar in 1810, and practiced law for four years. He began to co-edit The Weekly Messenger in 1813 and founded the Boston Daily Advertiser that same year, serving as editor and publisher until his death in 1863. Hale was one of the founders of the North American Review in 1815 and the Christian Examiner in 1823. In 1842, he was asked by the firm of Bradbury, Soden and Company to suggest an editor for a new monthly magazine they were planning to publish, The Boston Miscellany; Hale named his 21-year-old son, Nathan Hale, Jr., as its founding editor. Hale was active in promoting industrial improvement, especially the Boston and Albany Railroad and diverting the Lake Cochituate for potable water in the Back Bay, the Neck and the South Cove.

His alliance to the Federalist Party continued until its dissolution, after which Hale sided with the Whig Party and eventually the Republican Party. He opposed the Missouri Compromise, the Kansas-Nebraska Bill, and Scott v. Sanford. Hale served in the Massachusetts State Legislature.

In 1819, Hale was elected a Fellow of the American Academy of Arts and Sciences. He was also an active member of the Massachusetts Historical Society.

== Publications ==
He published a map of New England in 1825, and a series of stereotype maps on a plan of his own invention in 1830, being the first maps with names printed in page with type made by the founders. He also published Journal of Debates and Proceedings in the Massachusetts Constitutional Convention (Boston, 1821), and numerous pamphlets on the practicability of railroads, on canals, and other topics.

== Family ==
He married Sarah Preston Everett (sister of Edward Everett) in 1816. Their children included Sarah Everett Hale, Nathan Hale, Jr. (12 November 1818 in Boston - 9 January 1871), Lucretia Peabody Hale, Edward Everett Hale, Charles Hale, Alexander Hale, and Susan Hale. Nathan Sr. was also the nephew of Revolutionary War hero Nathan Hale.

Hale was the maternal uncle of Otis Clapp, who started his career working for Hale at the Boston Daily Advertiser.
