= Charles Hale =

American politician

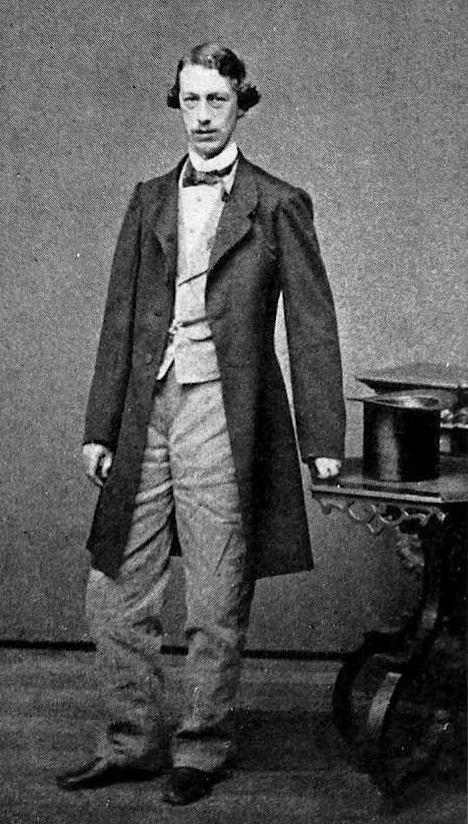
- Portrait of Charles Hale, c. 1861

8th United States Assistant Secretary of State
- In office February 19, 1872 – January 24, 1873
- President: Ulysses S. Grant
- Preceded by: Bancroft Davis
- Succeeded by: Bancroft Davis

United States Consul-General to Egypt
- In office c. October 15, 1864 – May 23, 1870
- President: Abraham Lincoln; Andrew Johnson; Ulysses S. Grant
- Preceded by: William Sydney Thayer
- Succeeded by: George Harris Butler

Speaker of the Massachusetts House of Representatives
- In office 1859–1859
- Preceded by: Julius Rockwell
- Succeeded by: John A. Goodwin

Personal details
- Born: June 7, 1831 Boston, Massachusetts
- Died: March 1, 1882 (aged 50) Boston, Massachusetts
- Resting place: Mount Auburn Cemetery
- Parent(s): Nathan Hale; Sarah Preston Everett
- Relatives: Edward Everett Hale (brother); Lucretia Peabody Hale (sister); Susan Hale (sister); Edward Everett (maternal uncle); Nathan Hale (granduncle)
- Education: Harvard College

Charles Hale (1831–1882) of Boston was an American legislator and diplomat. Intermittently from 1855 to 1877, he served in the Massachusetts state House and Senate. He was Speaker of the House in 1859. In the 1860s he lived in Cairo, Egypt, as the American consul-general. From 1872 to 1873 he worked as United States Assistant Secretary of State under Hamilton Fish.

== Biography ==
Hale was born in Boston on June 7, 1831, to Nathan Hale and Sarah Preston Everett. Siblings included Sarah Everett Hale, Nathan Hale Jr., Lucretia Peabody Hale, Edward Everett Hale, Alexander Hale, and Susan Hale.

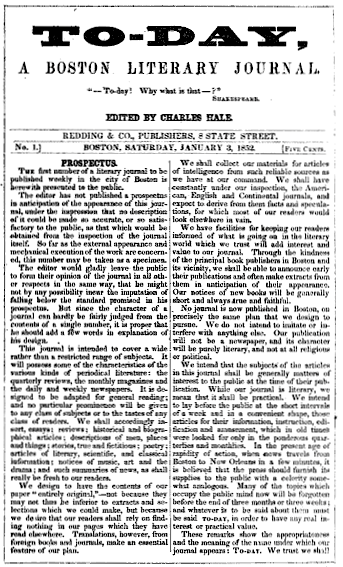
Issue no. 1 of To-Day, January 3, 1852

Charles graduated from Harvard College in 1850; whilst a student he rowed in the Undine Club. He served as class secretary, 1850–1882.

In his early career, Hale worked as a journalist. He founded the short-lived journal To-Day: a Boston Literary Journal in 1852, of which only two volumes were published. He also contributed to his father's paper, the Boston Daily Advertiser, in the 1850s and 1860s. There he started as a reporter after graduation, and was later a junior editor. He also contributed to the North American Review and to the Nautical Almanac.

In 1855, Hale was elected to the Massachusetts House of Representatives and was chosen Speaker in 1859, up to that time the youngest man ever chosen for the position. He served as U.S. consul-general in Cairo, Egypt, 1864–1870. In Alexandria he arrested with the cooperation of Egyptian authorities the conspirator, John Surratt, suspected of plotting the assassination of Abraham Lincoln.

In 1866, he was elected as a member to the American Philosophical Society.

In 1871, he was elected to the Massachusetts Senate. He was appointed chairman of the committee on railroads, in which capacity he drew up a general railroad act, and was active in securing its enactment. From 1872 to 1873 he worked as Assistant United States Secretary of State, under Hamilton Fish. He returned to Boston and was again elected to the state House of Representatives in 1876 and 1877. He was also appointed State Commissioner of Public Lands, responsible for "laying out the Back Bay."

During the latter part of his life he lived in retirement, occupied in literary work, and much of the time was an invalid. He died in Boston on March 1, 1882. A funeral was held at the South Congregational Church on March 4, at 3pm. "Among those present were Mayor Green, the Hon. Robert R. Bishop, President of the State Senate; the Rev. Edward Everett Hale, and other relatives of the deceased man, and also the Senators and Representatives who served during Mr. Hale's term in the Legislature; the members of the Harvard Class of '50, and the employees of the Boston Daily Advertiser." He is buried in Mount Auburn Cemetery.

== Works ==
- To-Day: a Boston Literary Journal. v.1 (January–June, 1852); v.2 (July–December, 1852).
- Nathan Hale; Charles Hale, eds. (1853). Journal of debates and proceedings in the Convention of delegates: chosen to revise the constitution of Massachusetts, begun and holden at Boston, November 15, 1820, and continued by adjournment to January 9, 1821, Reported for the Boston Daily Advertiser. Boston: Pub. at the office of the Daily Advertiser.
- "Our houses are our castles": A review of the proceedings of the Nunnery Committee, of the Massachusetts Legislature; and especially their conduct and that of their associates on the occasion of the visit to the Catholic school in Roxbury, March 26, 1855. Boston: C. Hale, at the office of the Boston Daily Advertiser. 1855.
- Documents in: Papers relating to the foreign relations of the United States. Washington DC: Government Printing Office. 1868.
- "The Khedive and the Court." Atlantic Monthly, May 1876.
- "Municipal Indebtedness." Atlantic Monthly, December 1876.

== See also ==
- 1859 Massachusetts legislature
- 1874 Massachusetts legislature
- 1875 Massachusetts legislature
- 1876 Massachusetts legislature

Massachusetts House of Representatives
Preceded by Julius Rockwell	Speaker of the Massachusetts House of Representatives; 1859	Succeeded by John A. Goodwin
