= Ilse-Margret Vogel =

Ilse-Margret Vogel (5 June 1914 – 7 October 2001) was a German-American author who mostly wrote for children and young adults. However, she is perhaps best known for her memoir Bad Times, Good Friends - A personal memoir which tells the story of her life between 1943 and 1945 living in Nazi Germany and how a small group of German artists and dissidents lived under Hitler. Vogel worked for the art dealer J.B. Neumann in New York.

Her husband is artist, children's author and illustrator Howard Knotts.

== Works ==
- Bad Times, Good Friends - A personal memoir. Ilse-Margret Vogel, Harcourt Brace Jovanovich, San Diego, 1992 ISBN 0-15-205528-2
- The Bear in the Boat. Ilse-Margret Vogel, Golden Press, Racine, Wisconsin, 1972
