= The Peterkin Papers =

The Peterkin Papers is a collection of humorous short stories by American author Lucretia Peabody Hale. The book was first published in 1880, and a sequel, The Last of the Peterkins was printed in 1886.

== Story publication history ==
The first Peterkin story, The Lady Who Put Salt in Her Coffee, was published in the April 1868 issue of the children's magazine Our Young Folks. Other stories in the series originally appeared in issues of Our Young Folks, until the periodical ceased publication in 1873. Later Peterkin stories were published in St. Nicholas Magazine.

== Synopsis ==
The family consisted of Mr. and Mrs. Peterkin and their children Elizabeth Eliza, Solomon John, Agamemnon, plus three unnamed little boys. They lived near Boston, and encountered difficulties due to their "scatterbrained naivete and were rescued from disaster in each case by the commonsensical Lady from Philadelphia." The author based the Lady from Philadelphia on her friend, Susan Lyman Lesley.
