= Charles Ghigna =

American poet and author (born 1946)

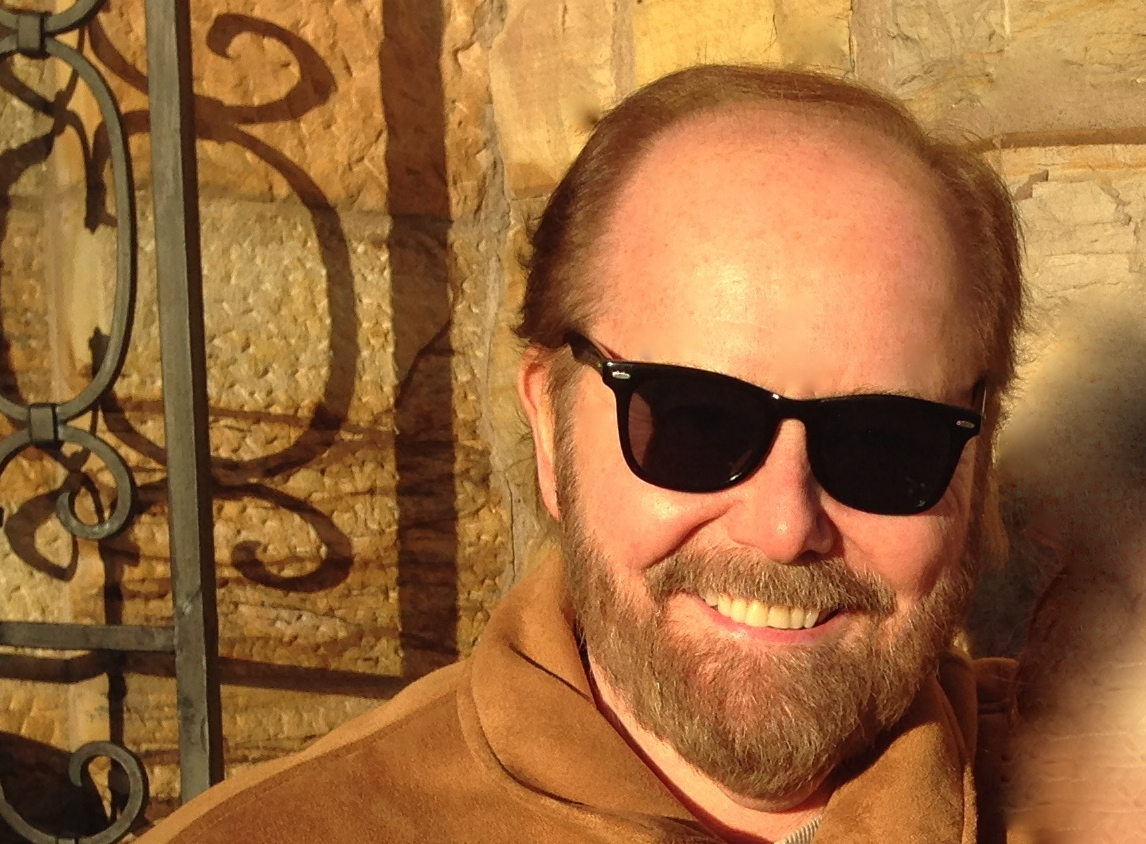
- Charles Ghigna
- Born: Charles Ghigna; August 25, 1946 (age 80); Bayside, Queens, New York City, US
- Occupations: Poet, children's author
- Spouse: Debra Ghigna
- Children: Chip Ghigna and Julie Ghigna
- Writing career
- Pen name: Father Goose
- Language: English
- Genres: Poetry, children's literature
- Website: www.charlesghigna.com

Charles Ghigna (/'gɪnˈjə/) (born August 25, 1946), known also as Father Goose, is an American poet and author of children's and adults' books. He has written more than 5,000 poems and 100 books.

Ghigna was born in Bayside, Queens. His parents relocated to Fort Myers, Florida when he was five. Ghigna graduated from Florida Atlantic University with a Bachelor of Arts in 1967, a Master of Education degree in 1970, and graduate studies at Florida State University in 1973-74. In 1974, he became a poet-in-residence and started teaching creative writing at the Alabama School of Fine Arts (ASFA). He subsequently worked on the children's television show Cabbages and Kings and in 1979 taught creative writing at Samford University.

Ghigna's first book of poetry, Returning to Earth, was published in 1989. He published his first children's poetry books in 1992, before leaving ASFA the following year and taking up writing for children full-time.

Ghigna lives in Homewood, Alabama with his wife, the author Debra Ghigna. Their son, Chip Ghigna, is an artist.
