= Boston Daily Advertiser =

Defunct daily newspaper in Boston

The Boston Advertiser
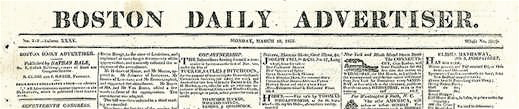
- Type: Daily newspaper
- Format: Broadsheet
- Founded: 1813
- Ceased publication: 1929
- Language: English
- Headquarters: Boston, Massachusetts; United States

The Boston Daily Advertiser (est. March 1813) was the first daily newspaper in Boston, and for many years the only daily paper in Boston.

== History ==
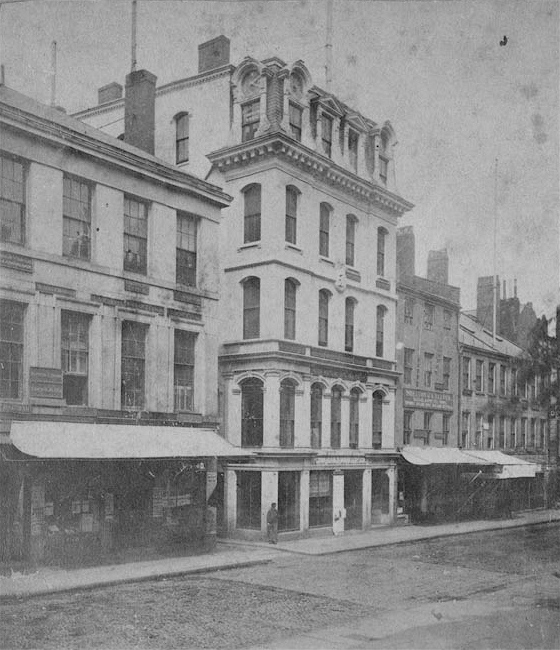
Daily Advertiser building, Boston, c. 1870s

The Advertiser was established in early March 1813. It was published by William W. Clapp and edited by Horatio Biglow; in March 1814, it was purchased by journalist Nathan Hale. Hale was its chief editor until his death in 1863. Under Hale's supervision, the paper was first Federalist in politics, then Whig, and finally Republican, and it became very influential. It opposed the Missouri Compromise of 1820 and the Kansas-Nebraska Act in 1854, and was the first paper to recommend the free colonization of Kansas. The principle of editorial responsibility, as distinct from that of individual contributions, was established in its columns. From 1841 until 1853, Hale's son Nathan Hale Jr., was associated with his father in the editorial management of the paper.

In 1832 the Advertiser took over control of The Boston Patriot, and then in 1840 it took over and absorbed The Boston Gazette.

In 1885 Elihu B. Hayes took over control of the Advertiser.

After Hayes the Advertiser was acquired by former Massachusetts House of Representatives Speaker and Massachusetts's 7th district Congressman William Emerson Barrett who published the Advertiser until his death on February 12, 1906.

The paper was purchased by William Randolph Hearst in 1917, became an illustrated tabloid in 1921, and ceased publication in 1929. Hearst continued using the name Advertiser for its Sunday paper until the early 1970s.

== Contributors ==
- Horatio Alger Jr., assistant editor (1853–1854)
- Edwin M. Bacon
- Louis C. Elson, music editor and critic (1888–1920)
- William Emerson Barrett Washington correspondent (1882–1886). editor in chief (1888), chief proprietor and publisher.
- Frank P. Bennett, editorial writer. Known for his writings on finance and tariffs.
- Peleg Chandler wrote for the paper covering legal matters
- Charles Hale
- Francis H. Jenks, theater critic
- George A. Marden.
- Samuel W. McCall, leading editorial writer.
- William M. Olin, reporter, editor, and Washington, D.C. correspondent.
- Epes Sargent, editor
- Galen Luther Stone, financial editor

== Allusions in literature ==
- In Richard Henry Dana Jr.'s 1840 novel Two Years Before the Mast, Dana reads every part of The Boston Daily Advertiser.
- In Henry James' 1878 novel The Europeans, Mr Wentworth reads The Boston Daily Advertiser.
- In William Dean Howells' 1885 novel The Rise of Silas Lapham, Bromfield Corey reads The Boston Daily Advertiser.

== Images ==
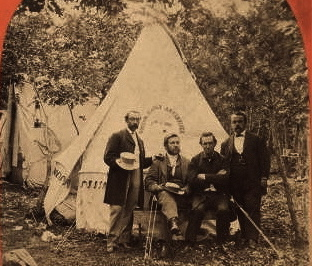
Four men in front of a tent with a sign for the Boston Daily Advertiser, 19th century

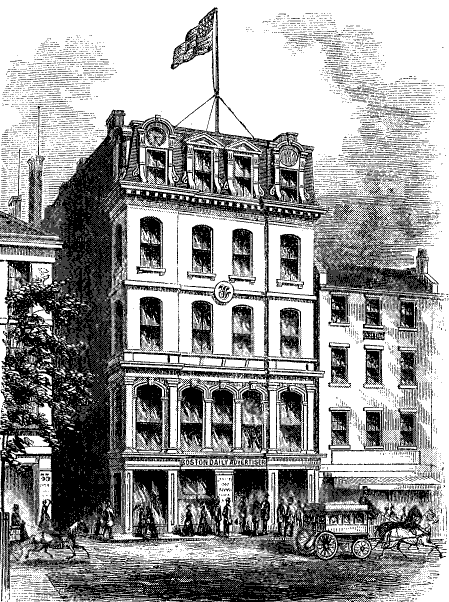
The Boston Advertiser Building circa 1872

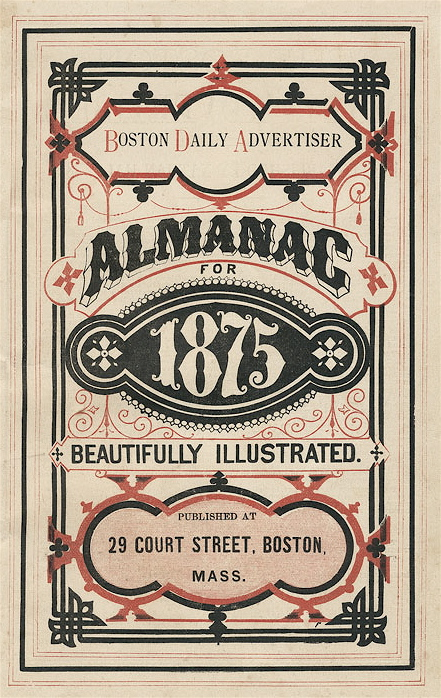
The Advertiser's Almanac for 1875

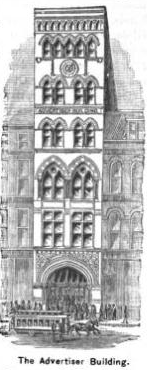
The Boston Advertiser Building cir. 1886

== See also ==
- Boston Weekly Messenger (1811-1861), the weekly edition of the Advertiser

== Bibliography ==
- The New York Times (April 2, 1903) "Death List of A Day.; Elihu Burritt Hayes", (1903), p. 9.
- The New York Times (February 13, 1906) "Death List of A Day.; William Emerson Barrett" (1906), P. 7.
- Chisholm, Hugh, ed. (1911). "Newspapers" . Encyclopædia Britannica. Vol. 19 (11th ed.). Cambridge University Press. pp. 544–581. (See page 567.)
- Howells, William Dean.: The Rise of Silas Lapham (1885).
- James, Henry.: The Europeans (1878).
