= 1918 Pulitzer Prize =

Awards for journalism and related fields

The following are the Pulitzer Prizes for 1918.

== Journalism awards ==
- Public Service:
  - The New York Times, for its public service in publishing in full so many official reports, documents and speeches by European statesmen relating to the progress and conduct of World War I.
- Reporting:
  - Harold A. Littledale of the New York Evening Post, for a series of articles exposing abuses in and leading to the reform of the New Jersey State prison.
- Editorial Writing:
  - Louisville Courier Journal, for the editorial article, "Vae Victis!" and the editorial, "War Has Its Compensation". (No author was named, but the editorials were written by Henry Watterson.)
- Newspaper History Award:
  - Minna Lewinson and Henry Beetle Hough, students at the Columbia University Graduate School of Journalism, for A History of the Services Rendered to the Public by the American Press During the Year 1917. (1918 was the only year in which this particular award was given.)

== Letters and Drama Awards ==
- Novel:
  - His Family by Ernest Poole (Macmillan)
- Drama:
  - Why Marry? by Jesse Lynch Williams (Scribner)
- History:
  - A History of the Civil War, 1861-1865 by James Ford Rhodes (Macmillan)
- Biography or Autobiography:
  - Benjamin Franklin, Self-Revealed by William Cabell Bruce (Putnam)

== Special Citations and Awards ==
- Poetry:
  - Love Songs by Sara Teasdale (Macmillan). This award was made possible by a special grant from the Poetry Society of America.
