= True Comics =

Ongoing educational comic book series published by The Parents Institute, 1941-1950

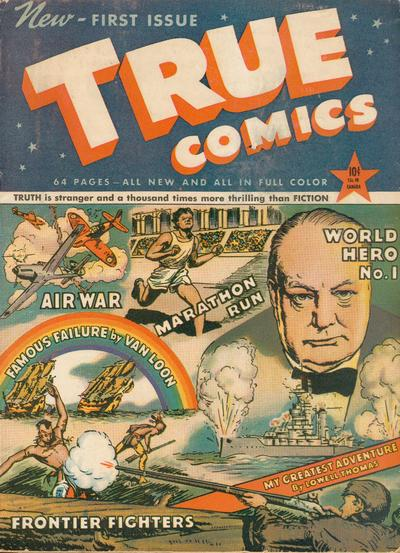
- Cover of True Comics #1, artist unknown.

Publication information
- Publisher: The Parents' Institute
- Schedule: Monthly, then bi-monthly
- Format: Ongoing series
- Genre: Historical
- Publication date: April 1941 – August 1950
- No. of issues: 84
- Editor(s): David T. Marke; Ralph O. Ellsworth

True Comics is an educational comic book series published by The Parents' Institute, whose main publication was Parents' Magazine. The series ran for 84 issues, from April 1941 until August 1950, when Parents' cancelled all of their comic book series. True Comics was the most successful, or at least longest-running, educational comic book series and spawned several imitators, including DC Comics' Real Fact Comics. The series embraced the motto of "truth is stranger than fiction" and attempted to demonstrate that children would prefer "real fact" stories over fictionalized ones. By its cancellation in 1950, Parents' had rolled at least 4 of its cancelled solo comics series into True Comics.

== Publication history ==
George J. Hecht, founder and publisher of Parents' Magazine, introduced True Comics in the aftermath of an attack on comic books by Sterling North, a children's author. In his position as a columnist at the Chicago Daily News, North published an invective against comic books titled "A National Disgrace", where he referred to comic books as "graphic insanity" and "sex-horror serials". Charging parents and teachers with "breaking the comic book", North suggested that children be furnished with proper works of literature to dissuade them from reading comic books.

Clara Savage Littledale, an editor at Parents', introduced the series as part of a March 1941 article titled "What To Do About the 'Comics'?" True Comics, close to North's intentions, was to provide a wholesome substitute of a comic book for children. In the introduction to True Comics #1, Hecht wrote:

As you all know there are many comic magazines. Originally the comic strips in newspapers and the comic magazines tried to be funny, and in a few cases succeeded. But nowadays most of the comic magazines no longer even try to be funny. They consist largely of exciting picture stories which everyone recognizes as not only untrue but utterly impossible. We are happy to present herewith a new and thoroughly different comic magazine. Lord Byron write many years ago: "T is strange, but true; for truth is always strange--Stranger than fiction". We have adopted as the slogan of True Comics, "Truth is stranger and a thousand times more interesting than fiction!" We are sure that you will agree after reading this issue.

— George J. Hecht, True Comics #1

True Comics was also one of, if not the first comic book series to have an editorial board overseeing its content. As historian Jill Lepore said in her work The Secret History of Wonder Woman, "...what really set True Comics apart was that it was overseen by an editorial advisory board of experts: professors, especially historians, educators, and even the public-opinion pollster George Gallup".

== Reception ==
Joe Simon, a contemporary of True Comics who drew some newspaper-syndicated stories for the comic during World War II referred to the main comic art of True Comics as "dull and graphically static".
