= Harold A. Littledale =

Welsh-born American journalist (1885–1957)

Harold Aylmer Littledale (1885–August 11, 1957) was a Welsh-born American journalist. He emigrated to Canada to work as a cattle rancher but moved to the United States around 1906 to find work in journalism. After a period in Chicago, he moved east to work for the New York Evening Mail. In 1913 Littledale switched to the New York Evening Post where he was assigned to report on the New Jersey prison system. He visited all of the state's prisons and worked undercover as a prisoner at the New Jersey State Prison. Littledale reported "medieval" conditions with some prisoners chained to walls in "dungeons" and given bread and water twice a day. His 1917 report led to a state inquiry that recommended reform of the entire system. Littledale had enlisted in the British Army and served in the Tank Corps towards the end of the First World War. He was on the Western Front when he learned he had been awarded the 1918 Pulitzer Prize in Reporting -- only the second such prize to be awarded -- for his prison work.

Littledale returned to the New York Evening Post after the war. His reporting in 1921 on neglect of wounded US Army veterans led to a Congressional investigation and creation of the Veterans Bureau. Littledale joined the New York Times in 1924 reporting on a number of aircraft stories before being promoted to suburban editor in 1928 and then to assistant to the managing editor. He was paralysed in a 1941 air crash and retired shortly afterwards. In 1952 Littledale wrote a book entitled Mastering Your Disability.

== Early life and Pulitzer Prize ==
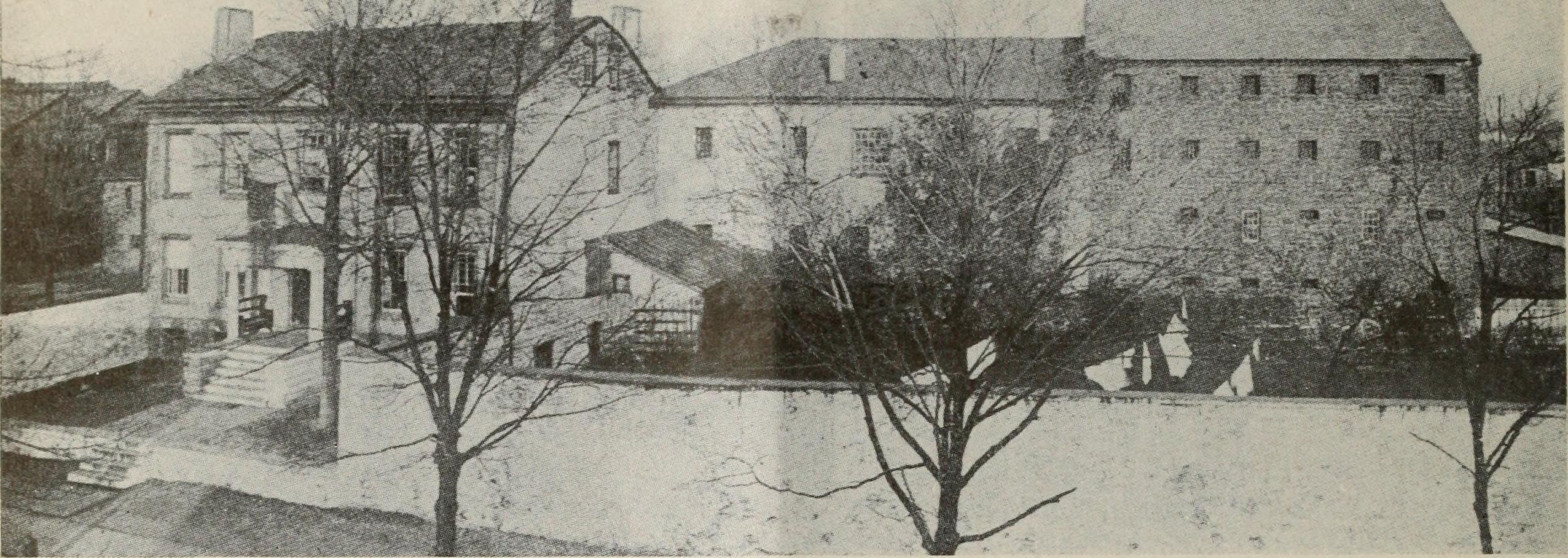
The New Jersey State Prison, pictured in 1917

Littledale was born in Wales in 1885; his father was a professor of mathematics at the University of Wales. Littledale was educated at Winchester College. He emigrated to Canada to work as a cattle rancher but moved to Chicago in the United States around 1906 to work as a journalist. Shortly afterwards he moved to the east coast to work on the New York Evening Mail. From 1913 Littledale was assistant cable editor at the New York Evening Post.

At the Post Littledale was assigned to report on conditions in the New Jersey prison system. As part of this investigation he arranged to visit all of the prisons in the system and even arranged to be sent inside as a prisoner to the New Jersey State Prison. Littledale described conditions at the prison as "medieval" with some rooms, known as dungeons, where prisoners were chained to the walls and given only bread and water twice a day. He documented illegal overcrowding, abusive work conditions (with legally mandated pay withheld from the prisoners) and poor food. In closing his reports, published in early 1917, he channelled 19th-century English prison reformer Elizabeth Fry, asking his readers whether prisoners should have the right to sunlight and to eat at a table rather than "having their food thrust into cages as if they were wild and dangerous beasts".

Within two weeks of Littledale's reports appearing in the press the New Jersey legislature empowered Governor Walter Evans Edge to set up a Prison Inquiry Commission. This commission, led by Dwight Morrow, reported within four weeks. It supported all but two of the eleven recommendations made by Littledale in his reports and noted that the prison labor system was an almost complete failure. The result was a complete reform of the state's prison system which included the bricking-up of the "dungeons" and guaranteeing prisoners access to the open air.

Littledale afterwards enlisted in the British Army, which was fighting in the First World War. He was assigned to the Tank Corps and served on the Western Front in France and Belgium. At one point, his tank was disabled in action and Littledale remained with it long enough to douse it with gasoline and set it afire to prevent its capture by the Germans. Littledale was with his unit on the front in June 1918 when he heard that he had won the 1918 Pulitzer Prize in Reporting and its $1,000 prize (equivalent to $21,405 in 2025). News of the award had been slow to reach him because of censorship of the cable messages. The award citation noted that it was made for his series of articles on the New Jersey prison system, he was only the second recipient of the award for reporting, which had first been awarded in 1917.

== Later career ==
After the war ended in 1918, Littledale returned to the US and to the New York Evening Post. One of his first reports there was on the plight of wounded veterans of the war. His exposure of neglect led to a Congressional investigation, during which Littledale was threatened with a summons for contempt of the Senate for refusing to disclose his sources. The investigation led to complete reform of the system and creation of the Veterans Bureau.

Littledale joined the New York Times in March 1924. He covered a number of aircraft stories and, while reporting on dirigibles, survived an airship crash. In 1927 he managed to secure the first reported interview with Commander James Fitzmaurice who had flown the Bremen to make the first successful east–west transatlantic flight by an airplane. Littledale beat many other reporters to the story by securing use of the only telegraph line from La Malbaie, near to where Fitzmaurice had landed. Littledale was appointed the New York Times's suburban editor in December 1928 and afterwards served as assistant to the managing editor.

On February 27, 1941, Littledale survived a crash in an Eastern Airlines plane which killed seven and injured nine. Littledale received spinal injuries that left him a wheelchair user; Eddie Rickenbacker, who later became chairman of the airline, was also among those injured. Littledale returned to the New York Times after the accident but retired in the mid-1940s. In 1952 he wrote Mastering Your Disability, a book with advice to disabled persons and their families. At the time of his death, he was working on a novel.

== Personal life and death ==
Littledale was fond of gardening and painting. He was married to Clara Littledale, the editor of Parents magazine, who died in 1956. The couple had a son, Harold Junior (living in South Harwich, Massachusetts), and two daughters: Irene (Littleton, Colorado) and Rosemary (Norwich, Vermont).

Littledale moved to Natick, Massachusetts in 1951. He was struck down by a long-lasting illness and died on August 11, 1957, in a rest home in the town at the age of 72.
