= Henry Hough =

Henry Hough may refer to:

- Henry Hughes Hough (1871–1943), United States Navy officer and military governor
- Henry Beetle Hough (1896–1985), American journalist and newspaper proprietor
