= George Hecht =

George Hecht may refer to:

- George Hecht (American football), American football player
- George J. Hecht, founder and publisher of Parents magazine and owner of FAO Schwarz
