= My Story =

My Story may refer to:

== Literature ==
=== Fiction ===
- My Story (Scholastic New Zealand), a series of historical novels for children
- My Story (Scholastic UK), a series of historical novels for children

=== Autobiographies ===
- My Story (Das book), by Kamala Das, 1977
- My Story (Kray book), by Ronnie Kray, 1993
- My Story (Duchess of York book), by Sarah, Duchess of York, 1996
- My Story (Couillard book), by Julie Couillard, 2008
- My Story (Minogue book), by Dannii Minogue, 2010
- My Story (Gillard book), by Julia Gillard, 2014
- My Story (Clarke book), by Michael Clarke, 2016
- My Story, by Hall Caine, 1906
- My Story, by Tom L. Johnson, 1911
- My Story, by Schapelle Corby, 2006
- Ingrid Bergman: My Story, by Ingrid Bergman, 1980

== Music ==
=== Albums ===
- My Story (Ayumi Hamasaki album), 2004
- My Story (Iyanya album), 2009
- My Story (Jenny Berggren album), 2010
- My Story (EP), by Beast, 2010
- My Story, by Wicked Wisdom, 2004

=== Songs ===
- "My Story" (R. Kelly song), 2013
- "My Story" (Puffy AmiYumi song), 2008
- "My Story", by Big Daddy Weave from Beautiful Offerings, 2015
- "My Story", by Cuban Link from Chain Reaction, 2005
- "My Story", by John Ashley, 1958
- "My Story", by Kero One, 2005
- "My Story", by Loren Gray, 2018

== Film ==
- Amy Fisher: My Story, 1992 TV movie
- My Story (film), 2018 Indian film

== See also ==
- My Own Story (disambiguation)
- Story (disambiguation)
- My (disambiguation)
