= My Style (disambiguation) =

My Style is a fashion and self-help book written by the Australian entertainer Dannii Minogue, released in September 2011.

== Fashion ==
- My Style, boutique Marijana Matthäus

== Music ==
- My Style, mini album by Brown Eyed Girls 2008
- "My Style", song by Nicky James
- "My Style", song by Mao Denda
- "My Style", song by f(x) from Pinocchio
- "My Style", song by Cho PD
- "My Style", song by The Black Eyed Peas from Monkey Business, 2005
- "My Style", song by Poppy from Poppy.Computer, 2017
- "My Style", song from the soundtrack Scratch
- "My Style", song from Forbidden Paradise 7: Deep Forest
