= My Own Story =

My Own Story may refer to:

== Autobiographies and memoirs ==
"My Own Story" is frequently the title of an autobiography or a memoir:

- My Own Story: An Account of the Conditions in Kentucky Leading to the Assassination of William Goebel, who was Declared Governor of the State, and My Indictment and Conviction on the Charge of Complicity in His Murder, a 1905 memoir by American politician Caleb Powers
- My Own Story: With Recollections of Noted Persons, a 1903 memoir by American author John Townsend Trowbridge
- My Own Story: An Episode in the Life of a New Zealand Settler of 50 Years Back, a 1904 memoir by Emilie Monson Malcolm
- My Own Story by Louisa of Tuscany Ex-Crown Princess of Saxony, a 1911 memoir of Archduchess Louise of Austria
- My Own Story (also released as Suffragette: My Own Story), a 1914 autobiography of British suffragette Emmeline Pankhurst
- Mo Sgéal Féin (Irish: My Own Story), a 1915 autobiography by Irish writer Peadar Ua Laoghaire
- My Own Story, a 1919 autobiography by American newspaperman Fremont Older
- My Own Story, as told to Mildred Harrington, a 1934 memoir by Canadian actress Marie Dressler
- Clearing in the West: My Own Story, a 1935 autobiography by Canadian political activist Nellie McClung
- The Bridge: My Own Story, a 1940 memoir by American writer Ernest Poole
- The Stream Runs Fast: My Own Story, a 1945 autobiography by Canadian political activist Nellie McClung
- My Own Story (also released as Jackie Robinson: My Own Story), an autobiography by African American baseball player, Brooklyn Dodgers #42, Jackie Robinson, the basis of the 1950 film The Jackie Robinson Story
- Baruch: My Own Story, a 1957 memoir by American financier Bernard Mannes Baruch
- My Own Story: The Truth About Modelling, a 1964 autobiography by British model Jean Shrimpton
- The Happy Hooker: My Own Story, a 1971 memoir by Dutch call girl Xaviera Hollander
- The Greatest: My Own Story, a 1975 autobiography by African American boxer Muhammad Ali (Cassius Clay)
- The Eternal Male: My Own Story, a 1977 autobiography by actor Omar Sharif
- Donahue: My Own Story, a 1979 memoir by American TV personality Phil Donahue
- Pavarotti: My Own Story, a 1981 autobiography by Luciano Pavarotti
- Chrissie: My Own Story, a 1982 autobiography by American tennis player Chris Evert
- Homesick: My Own Story, a 1982 award-winning autobiography by American writer Jean Fritz
- Laughter in the Rain: My Own Story, a 1982 autobiography by American singer-songwriter Neil Sedaka
- Frame by Frame: My Own Story, a 1985 autobiography by British snooker player Dennis Taylor
- Ryan White: My Own Story, a 1991 autobiography by American hemophiliac AIDS victim Ryan White
- Wouldn't It Be Nice: My Own Story, a 1991 memoir by American musician Brian Wilson
- Shane Warne: My Own Story: As Told to Mark Ray, a 1997 memoir by Mark Ray and Shane Warne
- Oksana: My Own Story, a 1997 memoir by Ukrainian figure skater Oksana Baiul
- Little Goes a Long Way: My Own Story, a 1999 autobiography by British comedian Syd Little
- Backstage You Can Have: My Own Story, a 2009 post-humous autobiography by American actress Betty Hutton

== Other uses ==
- My Own Story; Or, The Autobiography of a Child, a 1845 novel by British author Mary Howitt
- My Own Story, a 1919 op-ed editorial column in Green Book Magazine by Dema Harshbarger
- Zimbabwean Woman: My Own Story, a 1988 semiautobiographical work by Zimbabwean writer Sekai Nzenza
- From Innovation to Deconstruction: My Own Story, an op-ed column by British-Pakistani artist Rasheed Araeen

== See also ==
- Man in Black: His Own Story in His Own Words, a 1975 autobiography by American musician Johnny Cash
- Sophia Loren: Her Own Story, a 1980 American biopic of Italian actress Sophia Loren
- My Story (disambiguation)
