= Roosevelt Stadium =

Former stadium in Jersey City, New Jersey, US

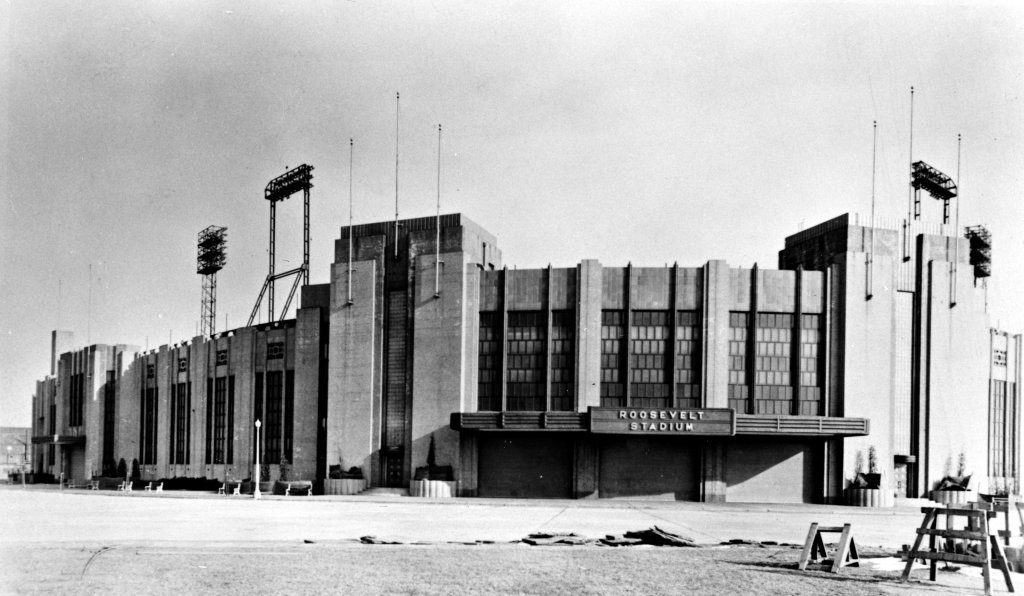
- Main stadium entrance, ca. 1940
- Interactive map of Roosevelt Stadium
- Full name: Jersey City Roosevelt Stadium
- Location: Danforth Ave. & New Jersey Route 1 (now NJ Route 440); Jersey City, New Jersey
- Coordinates: 40°42′23″N 74°6′18″W
- Owner: Jersey City
- Operator: Jersey City
- Capacity: 24,000
- Surface: Grass
- Field size: Left – 330 ft (100 m); Left Center – 377 ft (115 m); Center – 411 ft (125 m); Right Center – 377 ft (115 m); Right – 330 ft (100 m); Backstop – 60 ft (18 m)

Construction
- Groundbreaking: December 10, 1935
- Built: 1935–1937
- Opened: April 23, 1937
- Renovated: 1970
- Closed: 1981
- Demolished: 1985
- Cost: $1.5 million ($139 million in 2025 dollars)
- Architect: Christian H. Ziegler

Tenants
- Brooklyn Dodgers (MLB) (1956–1957, 15 games); Jersey City Giants (IL) (1937–1950); Jersey City Giants (AA) (1938–1950); Jersey City Jerseys (IL) (1960–1961); Jersey City State College (NCAA) (1966–1976); Jersey Jays (ACFL) (1970); Saint Peter's Peacocks (NCAA) (1971–1981); Jersey City Indians (EL) (1977); Jersey City A's (EL) (1978)

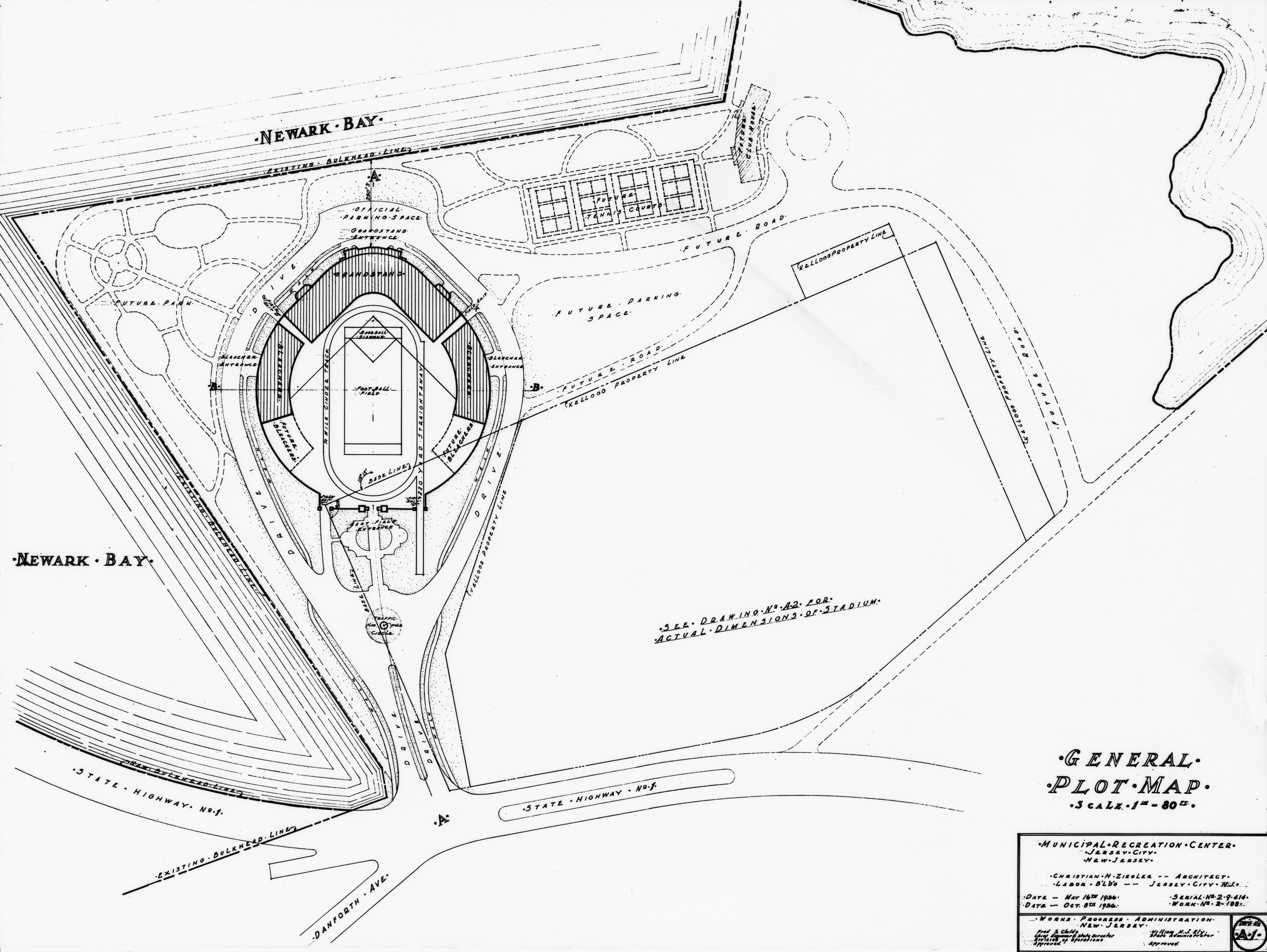
General map

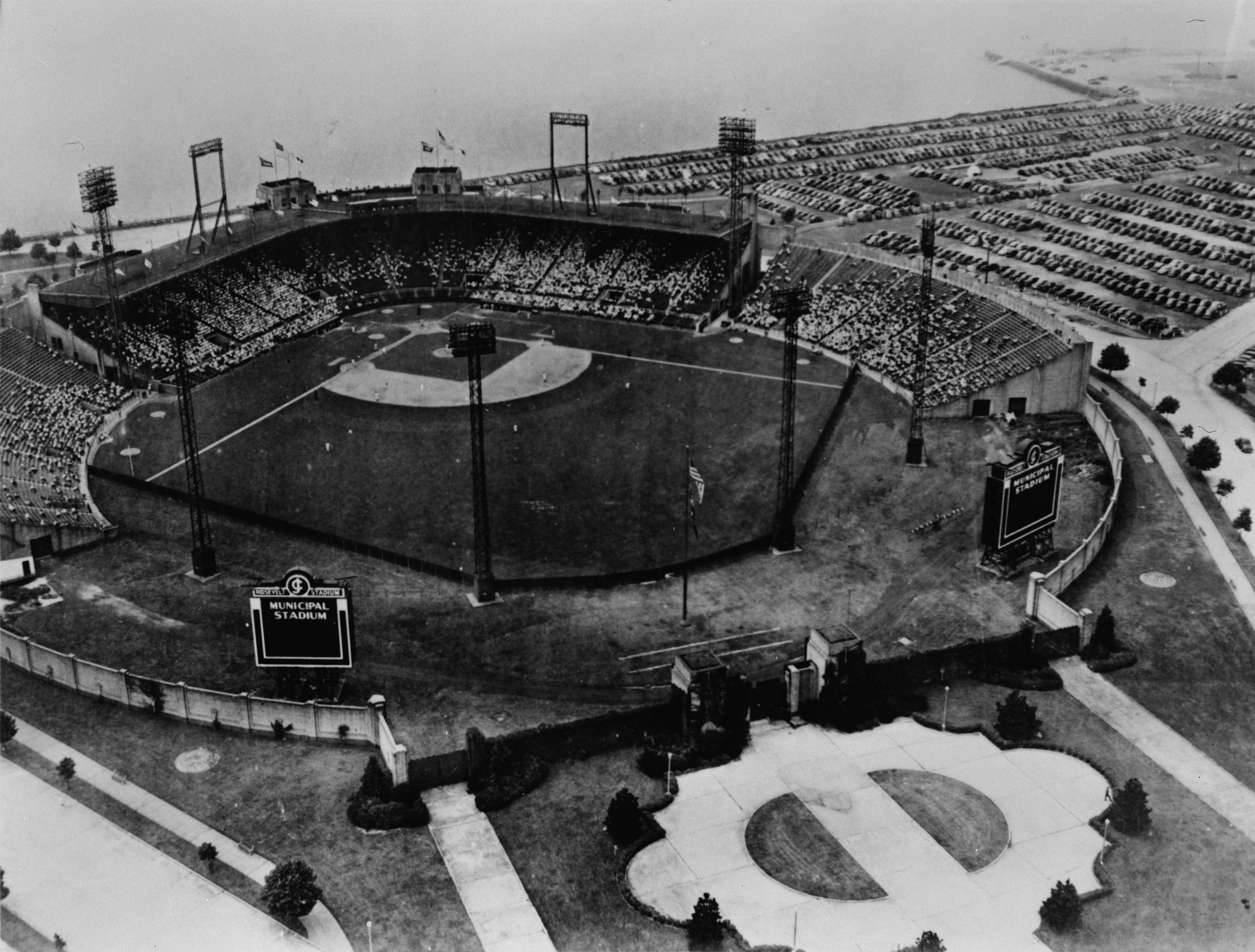
Baseball game at Roosevelt Stadium circa 1940.

Roosevelt Stadium was a baseball stadium at Droyer's Point in Jersey City, New Jersey. It opened on April 23, 1937, and was the home of the Jersey City Giants of the International League (IL), the Triple-A farm team of the New York Giants, from 1937 to 1950 and later hosted other high-minor league baseball teams. It also hosted 15 Major League Baseball (MLB) home games for the Brooklyn Dodgers from 1956 to 1957, plus championship boxing matches, top-name musical acts, an annual championship drum and bugle corps competition known as "The Dream" (1946–1983), professional wrestling matches, important regional high school football games, college and minor league football games, soccer matches and even NASCAR races. The stadium was demolished in 1985 and replaced by the Society Hill housing development.

== History ==
=== Planning and construction ===
On June 5, 1929, Jersey City Mayor Frank Hague announced his plans to construct a 50,000-seat municipal stadium in Jersey City to surround a field 500 feet (150 m) long by 400 feet (120 m) wide, that would be dedicated to the memory of the city's war dead. It was expected to cost $500,000 and be built by Spring 1930. Mayor Hague planned for the stadium to have 35,000 permanent seats with ground space for an additional 15,000. It would be a multi-purpose stadium for baseball, football, track and field events, and boxing.

The stadium was envisioned as a Works Progress Administration (WPA) project on the grounds of what was the Jersey City Airport at Droyer's Point. The airport was built and first operated by noted aviator Clarence D. Chamberlin in 1928 and then later operated by aviator Eddie August Schneider starting in 1935. By 1935, Jersey City was suffering from the effects of the Great Depression and Mayor Hague was looking to create construction jobs for Hudson County's working class. He applied for federal funds through the Civil Works Administration and the WPA of President Franklin D. Roosevelt's New Deal program. Under the terms of the grant program, the money received could not be used to purchase land so the city had to contribute land for the project. According to the Mayor, Droyers Point was the only available city-owned property and better suited for a municipal sports stadium than a municipal airport which would have eventually been a financial liability to the city. He boasted that the stadium would be a self-sufficient operation and would employ 250 people on a seasonal basis.

On December 10, 1935, Mayor Hague, with nearly 2,000 people in attendance, turned the first shovel of earth to officially break ground on the stadium. At the ceremony, Mayor Hague said, “We owe to President Roosevelt’s efforts the realization of our dream. He has been considerate of Jersey City in giving us this beautiful stadium. Besides the stadium, I am happy that its construction will provide work for nearly 1,000 men and through them hundreds of our citizens will benefit. This is a very happy occasion for all of us." Jersey City was awarded $1.5 million in federal WPA funds for the construction of the stadium which provided 2,400 jobs and in recognition of the award, Mayor Hague named the ballpark "Roosevelt Stadium" in honor of the president.

=== Design ===
Architect Christian H. Ziegler designed the stadium in the Art Deco style, a style he used in designing the former Jersey City Medical Center, to emphasize Jersey City's strength and influence. Considered the best minor league baseball park of the time, the 24,000-seat stadium was constructed of steel and concrete and featured marble sourced from Pennsylvania and Tennessee. The stadium was horse shoe and bowl shaped surrounded by a concrete wall with a terra-cotta façade. Terrazzo flooring was featured on the first floor and concourse, in bathrooms, locker rooms, showers and corridors. The grandstand was 60 feet (18 m) high and consisted of terraced seating of 35 rows and bleachers. Multiple well-placed ramps gave patrons easy access to their seats.

=== Opening ===
The ballpark's home opener was scheduled for April 22, 1937, with the opening of the 1937 International League season. Mayor Hague declared a half-holiday for the city's schools and employees. New York Giants owner Horace Stoneham was expected at the opener along with Senator Harry Moore. Rain washed out the planned events and the opening game was moved back to April 23 with Mayor Hague throwing out the first pitch and Sen. Moore and owner Horace Stoneham on hand for the ballpark's dedication. The Jersey City Giants took on the Rochester Red Wings with the Red Wings defeating the Giants 4–3 in front of an over capacity crowd of 31,234, a then minor league record.

== Events ==
=== Baseball ===
Roosevelt Stadium was constructed to serve as the home field of the Jersey City Giants, the Triple-A International League (IL) farm team of the New York Giants, from 1937 to 1950. The Giants won the International League regular-season pennant in 1939 and 1947 and were runners-up to the Syracuse Chiefs (formerly the Jersey City Skeeters) in the Governors' Cup playoffs in 1942, but no Giants team would ever win a pennant in postseason play. Hague routinely hawked opening day tickets for "Little Giants" games, selling 40,000 seats in a stadium that held only 24,000. When asked about the discrepancy, he was reported to have said "Hell of a crowd in the men's rooms."

On April 18, 1946, Roosevelt Stadium hosted the historic Jersey City Giants' season opener against the Montreal Royals, the Triple-A IL farm team of the Brooklyn Dodgers, marking the professional debut of the Royals' Jackie Robinson and the breaking of professional baseball's color barrier. Mayor Hague declared the day a half-day school holiday and threw out the ceremonial first pitch. A sold-out over capacity crowd of 51,872 witnessed Robinson's debut. In five trips to the plate he got four hits, including a three-run homer, scored four runs and drove in three; he also stole two bases in the Royals' 14–1 victory over the Giants. After the game, Robinson was mobbed by fans and well-wishers, Black and white, who wanted to congratulate him. Some people even followed him through the dugout tunnel and into the locker room. Robinson recalled his debut in his autobiography, My Own Story, saying "Although I was wearing the colors of the enemy, the Jersey City fans gave me a fine ovation. And my teammates were shouting, 'Come on, Jackie, start it off. This guy can't pitch. Get a-hold of one!'"

Between 1949 and 1950, future Hall of Famer Monte Irvin played several games with the Jersey City Giants in between being called up to the New York Giants. With Jersey City, he batted .373 in 1949 and .510 with ten home runs in eighteen games in 1950. In an interview with the Jersey Journal, Irvin reflected on his time playing at Roosevelt Stadium and said "What a wonderful stadium," "It was the class of the International League and better than many [Major League] stadiums. I had a lot of thrills there."

Following the 1950 season, the Jersey City Giants decided to move the club to Ottawa due to recent drops in attendance. Like their former neighbors and rivals, the Newark Bears, they found that rather than attending local minor league affiliate games, fans in New Jersey, due to the growth of television after World War II, were increasingly watching Giants, Dodgers and Yankees games from the comfort of their own homes.

On July 8, 1960, it was announced high-minor league baseball would return to Roosevelt Stadium with the Jersey City Jerseys of the IL for the 1960 and 1961 season. The Jerseys, the Triple-A team for the Cincinnati Reds, had moved from Havana, Cuba where they were known as the Havana Sugar Kings and had just won the 1959 International League title. The Sugar Kings move was forced by Fidel Castro nationalizing all U.S.-owned enterprises in Cuba and Baseball Commissioner Ford Frick feeling political pressure at home from Secretary of State Christian Herter to protect the “safety and welfare” of club personnel and baseball's interests. On July 15, the club arrived in Jersey City and was greeted by its residents as it took part in an eight-car twenty-mile motorcade through the city on their way to the stadium to play the Columbus Jets.

The stadium would see the last high-minor league baseball competition with the Jersey City Indians of the Double-A Eastern League (EL) in 1977 and following a change in minor-league affiliation from the Cleveland Indians to the Oakland A's, the Jersey City A's of the EL in 1978 led by future Hall of Famer Rickey Henderson.

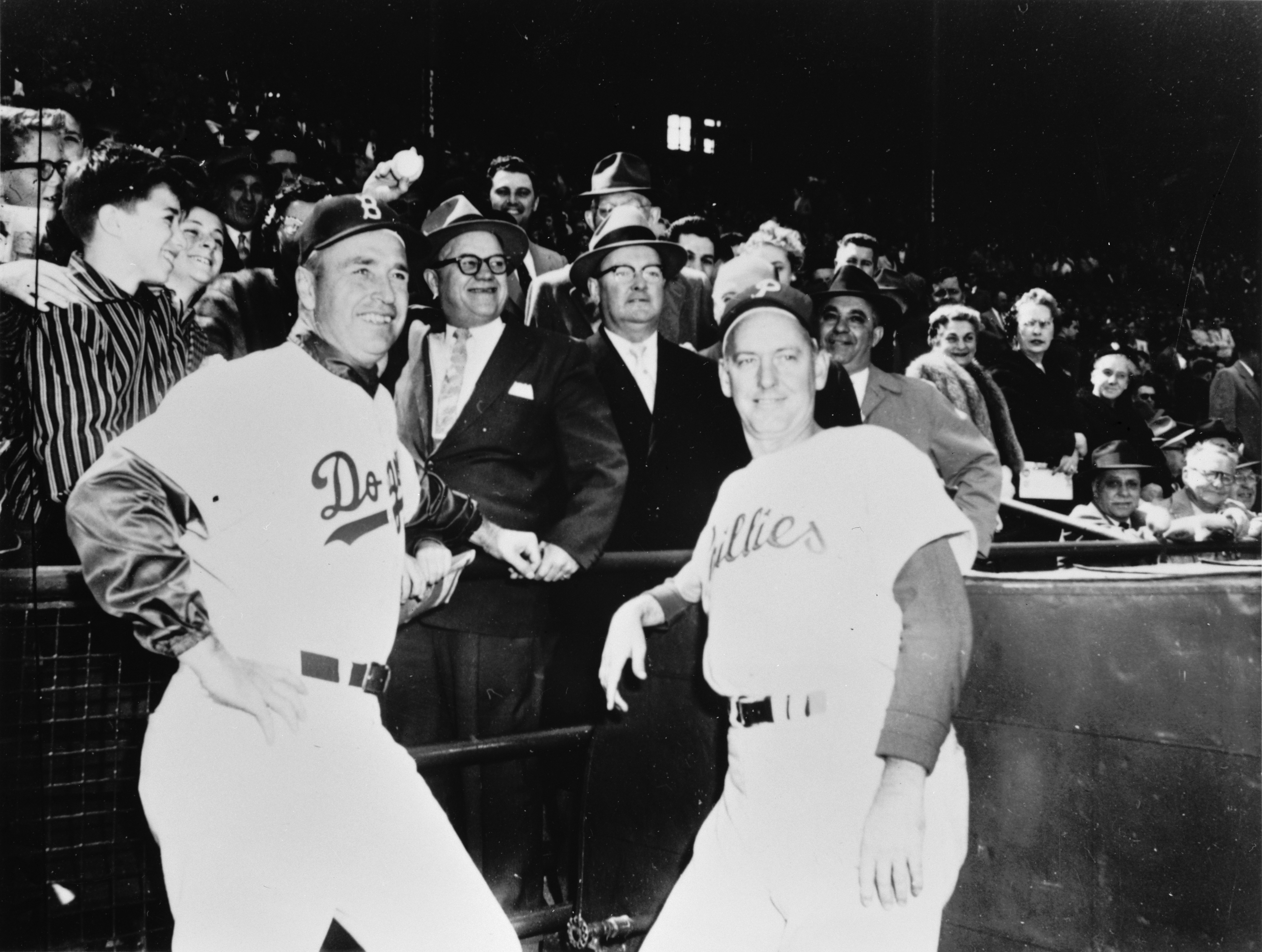
Brooklyn Dodgers manager Walter Alston with Philadelphia Phillies manager Mayo Smith before a 1957 game at Roosevelt Stadium

==== Major League Baseball ====
From 1956 to 1957, the stadium hosted 15 "home" games by the Brooklyn Dodgers during their last two seasons in Brooklyn – seven in 1956 and eight in 1957. The games were played partly as a negotiating tactic with the City of New York and the Borough of Brooklyn, in pursuit of a new stadium to replace Ebbets Field. While it had just 24,000 seats as opposed to Ebbets Field's 31,497, Roosevelt Stadium had 10,000 parking spaces compared to Ebbets Field's 700. The agreement between Jersey City and the Dodgers stipulated that the club would rent Roosevelt Stadium from the city for an annual fee of $10,000. The Dodgers also agreed to absorb the cost of making the stadium ready for major league baseball. In return, the Dodgers received all parking and ticket revenue. Team owner, Walter O'Malley, added that if by 1958 their new stadium in Brooklyn was still under construction, the Dodgers would not play at Ebbets Field and could play the entire season in Jersey City. The Dodgers' negotiations with the City of New York came to naught, and the team moved to Los Angeles in 1958.

During their time at Roosevelt Stadium, the Dodgers played in several memorable games.

On April 19, 1956, the Dodgers played the Philadelphia Phillies in their first game at Roosevelt Stadium. A pregame ceremony was held with the club raising their 1955 World Series Championship banner which was displayed at both Roosevelt Stadium and Ebbets Field. The ceremonial first pitch was thrown out by Jersey City mayor Bernard Berry, and Eddie Fisher sang the National Anthem. Jersey City's St. Patrick's Drum and Bugle Corps also took part in the festivities. The game went to extra innings tied 3–3. Down 4–3 in the bottom of 10th inning, the Dodgers would tie the game and with the bases loaded, Rube Walker hit a sacrifice fly to center field that allowed Don Zimmer to score the winning run and give the Dodgers a 5–4 victory over the Phillies.

On July 25, 1956, Carl Furillo hit the Dodgers' first home run at the stadium off of Brooks Lawrence. The game ended with a walk-off home run by future Hall of Famer Duke Snider to give the Dodgers the 2–1 victory over the Cincinnati Redlegs.

On August 15, 1956, the Dodgers hosted their rival, the New York Giants, at the stadium. The Giants had built a large following in Jersey City after being the home of their Triple-A affiliate, the Jersey City Giants, for 13 years. Jackie Robinson went 0–4 and was booed by the sold-out pro Giants crowd of 26,385. The most memorable moment of the game occurred in fourth inning when future Hall of Famer Willie Mays hit the only home run ever hit completely out of Roosevelt Stadium off of Don Newcombe. That home run gave the Giants the 1–0 victory over the Dodgers.

On June 5, 1957, future Hall of Famer Don Drysdale pitched the first of his 49 Major League shutouts at the stadium defeating the Chicago Cubs 4–0.

The stadium

=== Boxing ===
Boxing matches were also a big draw at the stadium. In 1940, former heavyweight champion Max Baer beat "Two Ton Tony" Galento at Roosevelt Stadium. A few months later, Baer stopped Pat Comiskey in the first round at the Stadium. On September 21, 1948, European champion Marcel Cerdan of France defeated Tony Zale for the world middleweight championship title in one of the Tournament of Champions bouts held at the stadium. On August 9, 1950, Sugar Ray Robinson defeated the former 3-time New Jersey State Champion Charley Fusari to defend his welterweight title.

=== Football ===
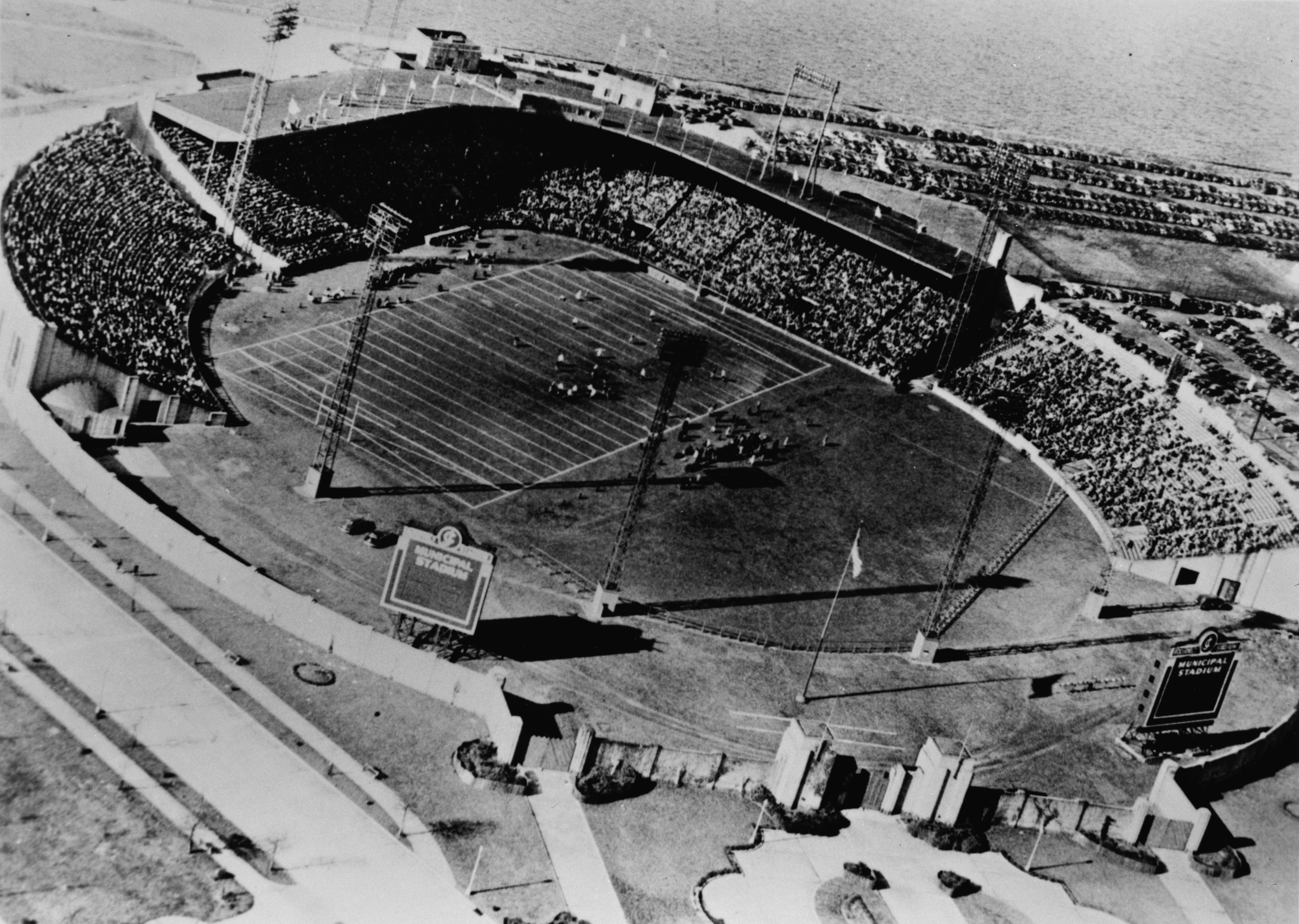
Football game at Roosevelt Stadium

Although, initially constructed as a home field for the Jersey City Giants, the stadium later saw its most common use for high school football, as Jersey City's William L. Dickinson, James J. Ferris, Abraham Lincoln, Henry Snyder high schools and the city's major parochial schools, Hudson Catholic and St. Peter's Prep, all used the stadium, particularly on Thanksgiving Day, when Dickinson and St. Peter's would play before soldout crowds. On September 28, 1974, it was the site of the game that set the New Jersey state record for consecutive losses by a high school football team at 42, when Dickinson High School lost to Hudson Catholic, 22–0. The Hawks offense was led by quarterback Steven Neri and halfback Tony Cavallo and Dickinson was held to -2 yards rushing and 18 passing by a Hudson defense led by Steve Cuccinelli, Ray Parente and Bruce Bock. Neri, Bock, Parente and Cuccinelli have all been inducted into the Hudson Catholic Football program's Wall of Fame.

From 1938 to 1950, the stadium hosted the Jersey City Giants of the American Football Association (AA), a farm team of the New York Football Giants. Tim Mara purchased the team and moved them to Jersey City in 1938 making the Jersey City Giants the first minor league team in professional football. Coached by Jersey City native Ed Franco, the Jersey City Giants would go on to win the league title a record three times (1938, 1940, 1946).

In 1960, the stadium hosted a pre-season NFL game between the Green Bay Packers and New York Football Giants to celebrate the city’s 300th anniversary. The game was arranged by the Packers future Hall of Fame coach Vince Lombardi and Ed Franco who were teammates on the Fordham University's Seven Blocks of Granite offensive line.

The stadium hosted college football with Jersey City State College (now New Jersey City University) playing their home games on Friday nights at the stadium from 1966 to 1976 prior to the opening of the Thomas M. Gerrity Sports Complex on the adjacent tidelands. Saint Peter's College also played their home games at the stadium from 1971 until the stadium's closure.

In 1970, the stadium hosted the Jersey Jays of the Atlantic Coast Football League (ACFL), a farm team of the Cleveland Browns.

During the 1973 NFL season, the New York Football Giants practiced at the stadium while they were playing their home games in New Haven, Connecticut at the Yale Bowl. During this time, their future home, Giants Stadium, was under construction at the Meadowlands Sports Complex.

=== Soccer ===
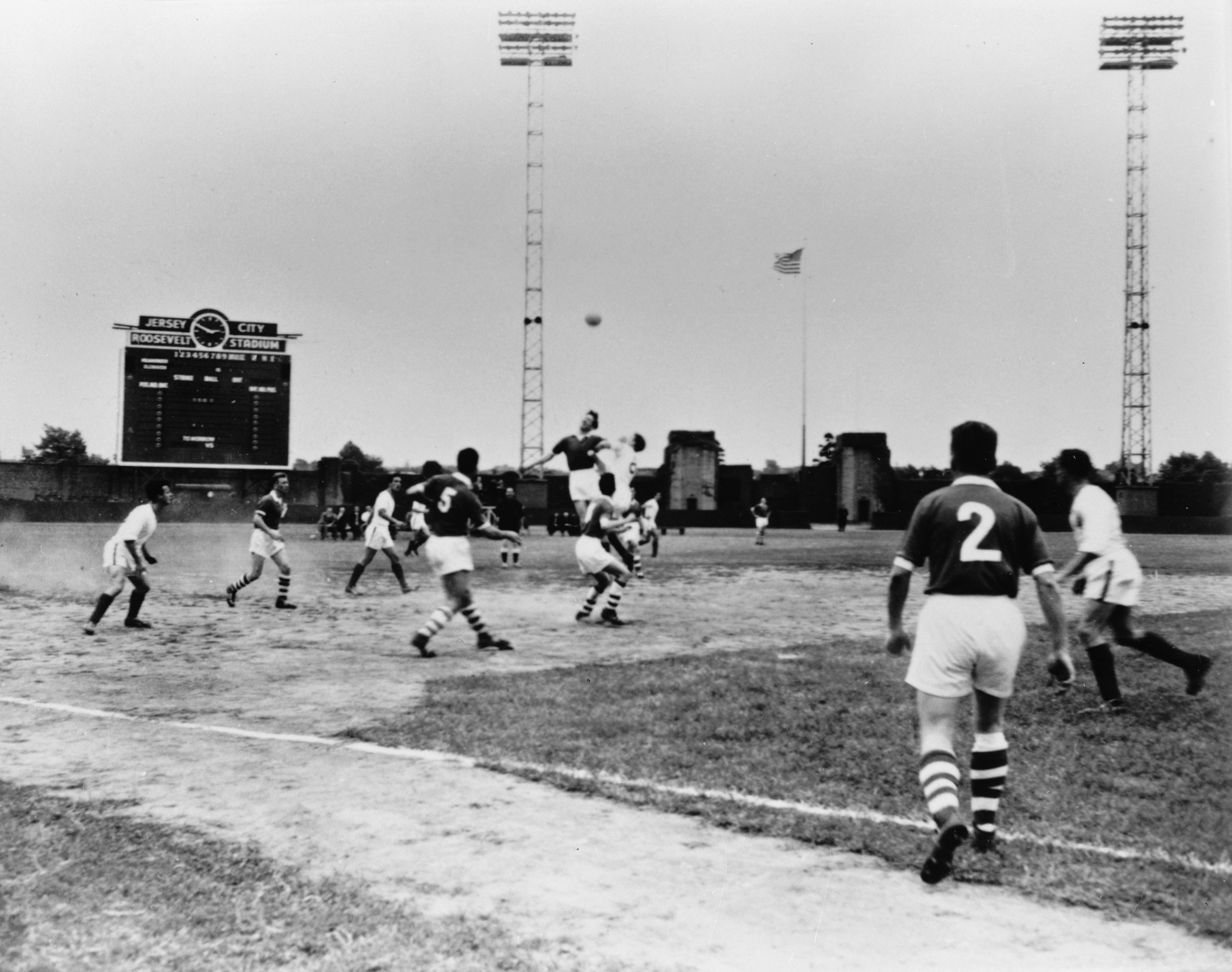
Soccer game at Roosevelt Stadium in 1960

In the 1960s and 1970s, Roosevelt Stadium became a top venue for several domestic and international soccer matches.

In 1960, the stadium hosted several matches for the International Soccer League (ISL), an affiliate league of the American Soccer League, including the leagues' debut matches that it co-hosted with the Polo Grounds.

On June 19, 1960, the stadium hosted a double header for the first section title of the ISL. The first match featured Burnley F.C. against OGC Nice with Burnley winning 4–0. The second match saw Kilmarnock F.C. defeat the New York Americans 3–1 in front of 11,704 fans. Kilmarnock won their first section title with a 4–0–1 record and Burnley finished as runner-up.

On June 20, 1971, the stadium hosted a North American Soccer League (NASL) and international soccer double-header. The New York Cosmos played the Dallas Tornado in the opener where the Cosmos rallied to beat the Tornado 3–1. Bologna took on West Ham United in the second match with Bologna winning 2–1 in front of 9,000 fans. The first game of the doubleheader was set for Yankee Stadium in the Bronx but the contract that the Cosmos had with the Yankees allowed for a "weather clause" in which the baseball team could cancel if bad weather conditions posed a potential threat to the field.

A week later on June 27, 1971, Santos FC, led by the legendary Pelé, played Bologna in an exhibition match in front of raucous crowd of 21,414 fans. When Pelé stepped on to the field, hundreds of fans stormed the field to get close to him for pictures and autographs. The Jersey City Police Department's mounted police gained control of the crowd but not before kickoff was delayed for thirty-five minutes. The match ended in a 1–1 draw.

On May 25, 1973, Santos FC and Pelé returned to Roosevelt Stadium to take on Lazio in front of passionate sold-out crowd of 26,145 fans. Pelé was swarmed by fans on his way into the stadium looking for autographs and pictures. The game was repeatedly stopped by fans, who threw beer cans, bottles and even chairs onto the field. In the ninth minute, Pelé scored on a free kick through a wall of seven players. With two minutes left in the match, Lazio was set up to take a penalty kick, but fans stormed the field and the referees called the game with Lazio never taking the shot and Santos FC winning 3–0.

=== Professional wrestling ===
In 1975, the stadium hosted three professional wrestling matches held by the International Wrestling Association (IWA). The first and most notable match took place on October 7, 1975, featuring former WWWF World Heavyweight Champion Ivan Koloff taking on Mil Máscaras for the IWA World Heavyweight Championship with Máscaras winning on a double count out in front of 14,000 fans.

=== Concerts ===
From 1972 to 1976, Roosevelt Stadium saw a second life as a premier outdoor concert venue for national touring acts. The stadium hosted multiple concerts by notable performers such as Eric Clapton, Rod Stewart, Alice Cooper, The J. Geils Band, Flash, Chicago, The Beach Boys, The Kinks, Looking Glass, Joe Cocker, Mark Almond Band, Patto, Leon Russell, New Riders of the Purple Sage, Three Dog Night, T.Rex, The Band, Santana, Tower of Power, Grand Funk Railroad, Blue Öyster Cult, Lee Michaels, Poco, The Allman Brothers Band, The Marshall Tucker Band, Emerson, Lake & Palmer, Seals and Crofts, America, The Eagles, Yes, Lynyrd Skynyrd, The Doobie Brothers, Kiss, Bob Seger and The Silver Bullet Band, Boz Scaggs, and Randy Meisner.

On August 8, 1974, Crosby, Stills, Nash & Young played their first New York area concert in four years to a crowd of about 50,000 people at the stadium. During the band's intermission former president Richard Nixon announced he was resigning from office due to his role in the Watergate scandal. Graham Nash took to the stage and announced the news to the capacity crowd. The crowd cheered and set off a few fireworks in celebration. The first song the band played after the announcement was David Crosby's “Long Time Gone” to mark the occasion.

Pink Floyd played four concerts at Roosevelt Stadium: June 14 & 16, 1973; July 18, 1974; and June 14, 1975.

The Grateful Dead played the most concerts at Roosevelt Stadium with six: July 18, 1972; September 19, 1972; July 31, 1973; August 1, 1973; August 6, 1974; and August 4, 1976.

=== Other events ===
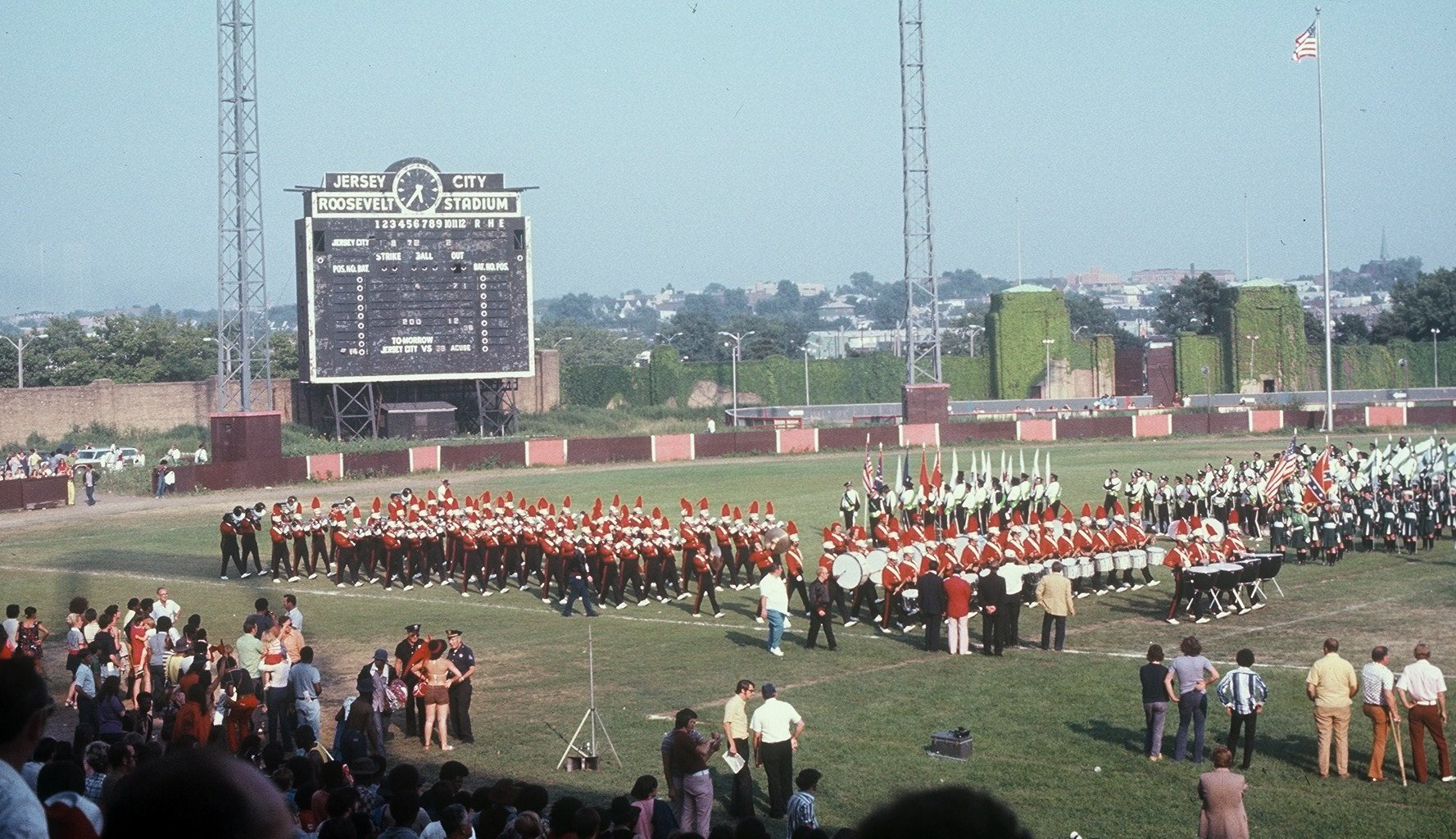
Drum & Bugle Corps perform at Roosevelt Stadium, 1972.

Roosevelt Stadium was a popular venue for drum and bugle corps contests throughout its history. From 1946 to 1983, the stadium hosted The National Dream Contest, "The Dream", for drum and bugle corps organizations. On September 8, 1957, the stadium hosted the ninth annual "National Drum Contest," a competition of eight champion drum corps held by the United Organizations of Bayonne. On September 15, 1963, the stadium hosted the first annual World Open Championship sponsored by Drum Corps News for junior drum and bugle corps in the United States and Canada.

In the early 1950s, NASCAR hosted several stock car races along the perimeter of the stadium's field and warning track. On June 5, 1954, a 100-lap NASCAR championship event was held at the stadium.

During the 1960s, the Harlem Globetrotters performed at the stadium on several occasions.

Beginning in the 1970s, the stadium began holding religious conventions for the Jehovah's Witnesses. On July 4, 1971, 16,000 people gathered at the stadium to listen via closed-circuit radio to Nathan H. Knorr speak from an assembly at Yankee Stadium. From July 18–21, 1974, over 10,000 people filled the stadium over four days for a district assembly. From July 25–28, a Spanish language assembly was held for 18,000 people.

In the early 1970s, a 200 feet (61 m) long by 100 feet (30 m) wide outdoor ice skating rink was erected by the city in the winter months and became a popular attraction.

== Closing and demolition ==
By the 1970s, the stadium had fallen into disrepair. In 1970, Jersey City made attempts to keep the stadium viable with several renovations such as re-sodding the playing field and overhauling the drainage, roofing and steam heating systems. However, further renovations of the structure were impeded by asbestos and overall decay. In 1972, the city lost $68,000 operating the stadium. In 1978, a 30 foot (9.1 m) light tower fell off the roof of the grandstand which weakened the stadium's exterior walls and other light towers. In 1981, two additional light towers collapsed forcing the city to close the stadium for repairs and then permanently.

That year, the city's Division of Urban Research and Design estimated that repairs to the stadium would cost about $4 million and recommended, instead, to demolish the stadium and build new housing. From 1970 to 1980, Jersey City's population dropped 14.1%, a loss of 37,000 people. Local officials asserted that there was a need for the new housing and the $4 million in tax revenue it would provide to stave off further population loss.

In November 1982, the Jersey City City Council voted to demolish the stadium and replace it with a $200 million middle-income housing development. In 1985, the stadium was finally demolished and the gated community known as Society Hill opened on the site in 1996 with a later phase, known as Droyer's Point, opening in 2004.

Roosevelt Stadium survived longer but ultimately met a similar fate as two other historic New York area ballparks of its time. Ebbets Field in Brooklyn was demolished in 1960 and replaced with a middle-income housing development known as the Ebbets Field Apartments in 1962. The Polo Grounds in Upper Manhattan was demolished in 1964 and replaced with a public housing development known as Polo Grounds Towers in 1968.

=== Replacement ===
In October 1983, Jersey City opened Cochrane Stadium in the Caven Point section of the city as a modern but more modest 4,000 seat municipal stadium replacement for the city's residents and local schools.

== Legacy ==
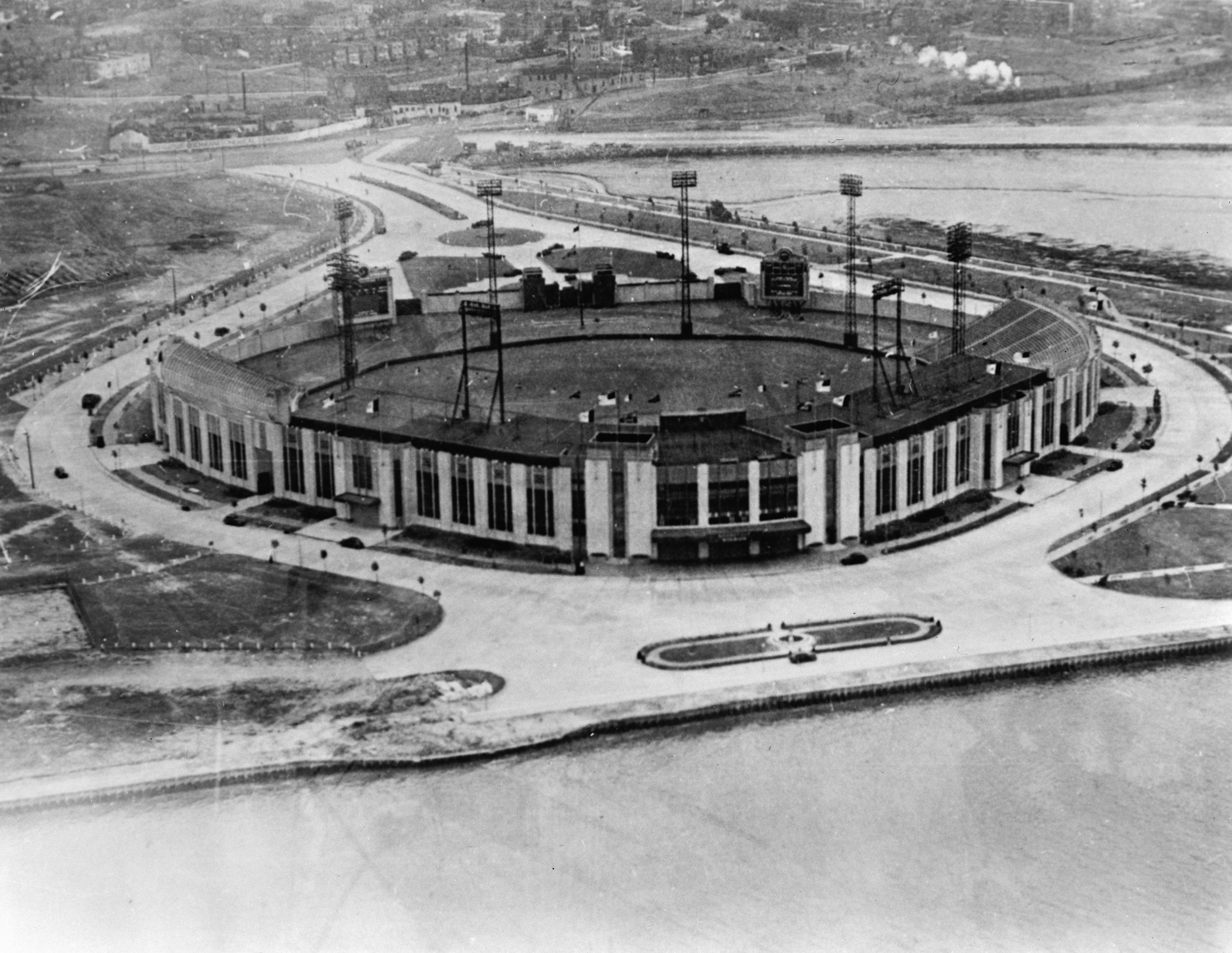
Aerial view of Roosevelt Stadium from over Newark Bay

Roosevelt Stadium and the events that it hosted have been commemorated in several ways.

=== Memorials ===
- In 1985 prior to demolition, one of Roosevelt Stadium's seats was donated to the National Baseball Hall of Fame and Museum in Cooperstown, New York and another seat was donated to the Smithsonian Institution in Washington, D.C. to be displayed at both museums.
- On April 17, 1996, a plaque was dedicated in a gazebo at Society Hill to commemorate the site of Roosevelt Stadium and to honor the fiftieth anniversary of Jackie Robinson's historic debut at the stadium breaking baseball's color barrier.
- On February 25, 1998, the Statue of Jackie Robinson was erected in the plaza at the Journal Square Transportation Center in Jersey City. Sculpted by artist Susan Wagner, the 14 feet (4.3 m) statue features Robinson with both arms outstretched and catching a ball with his gloved hand. The statue commemorates the breaking of baseball's color barrier by Robinson by playing in his first minor league game with the Montreal Royals at Roosevelt Stadium.

=== In media ===
- In the 1950 film The Jackie Robinson Story, in part based on Robinson's own autobiography, My Own Story, his historic professional debut with the Montreal Royals is first depicted with Gilmore Field standing in for Roosevelt Stadium. The stadium is also referenced several times in the film.
- In the 2007 HBO documentary Brooklyn Dodgers: Ghosts of Flatbush, the last ten years of the Dodgers' tenure in Brooklyn are chronicled. The film specifically highlights Dodgers owner Walter O'Malley's use of Roosevelt Stadium as a part-time home of the Dodgers in 1956 and 1957 in his failed attempts to convince Robert Moses, New York City Construction Coordinator, to let him build a new geodesic domed stadium in Downtown Brooklyn to replace Ebbets Field.
- In the 2013 film 42, a biographical sports film about Jackie Robinson, his historic professional debut with the Montreal Royals is depicted with Luther Williams Field doubling as Roosevelt Stadium.

=== In fashion ===
- In July 2023, the limited edition New Balance 440, modeled around Roosevelt Stadium and Jersey City, was released. The sneaker was developed as a collaboration between NJ Skateshop and New Balance Numeric (New Balance's skateboarding brand) to celebrate the history of Roosevelt Stadium and its former location in Jersey City, NJ Route 440. As an extra nod to the stadium, NJ Skateshop teamed up with Jersey City-based pencil manufacturer, General Pencil Company, to create 1,000 custom pencils included with the shoes that read ‘Roosevelt Stadium, April 18th, 1946’ as an ode to the pencils that were used for scorekeeping at Jersey City Giants games and Jackie Robinson's historic debut.

== See also ==
- List of baseball parks in Jersey City, New Jersey
- Jersey City Armory
- Boyle's Thirty Acres
