= Jersey City Jerseys =

Minor league baseball team based in Jersey City, New Jersey

The Jersey City Jerseys were a minor league baseball team based in Jersey City, New Jersey that played in the International League for two seasons, 1960 and 1961. They were the AAA affiliate of the Cincinnati Reds. The team's home stadium was Roosevelt Stadium. The team began life in Havana, Cuba as the Havana Cubans (and later renamed the Havana Sugar Kings) then moved to Jersey City following the Cuban Revolution. The team folded and moved to Jacksonville, Florida, becoming the Jacksonville Suns.

== History ==
The team began in 1946 in Havana, Cuba as the Havana Cubans competing in the Florida International League. The team was renamed the Havana Sugar Kings upon joining the International League in 1954. The team then ended up winning the 1959 Little World Series in seven games over the Minneapolis Millers of the American Association. However, the next year, Fidel Castro nationalized all U.S.-owned enterprises in Cuba, and on July 8, 1960, Baseball Commissioner Ford Frick announced that the Sugar Kings would be moving to Jersey City, New Jersey and be renamed the Jersey City Jerseys, a move that led manager Tony Castaño to quit the team.

The team featured many Cuban and Latino players including Leo Cárdenas, Mike Cuellar, Vic Davalillo, Julián Javier, and Cookie Rojas. However, the Jerseys would last only one more season (1961) before folding due to poor attendance. The franchise was then sold to the Cleveland Indians, who moved it to Jacksonville, Florida, where it became the Jacksonville Suns.

== See also ==
- Jersey City Skeeters
- Jersey City Giants
- Jersey City Indians
- Jersey City A's
