= Real Fact Comics =

Ongoing historical comics series published by DC Comics, 1946-1949

- The cover of Real Fact Comics #1 (March/April 1946), art by Jack Kirby and Dick Sprang.

Publication information
- Schedule: Bimonthly
- Format: Ongoing series
- Genre: Historical
- Publication date: March/April 1946 – July/August 1949
- No. of issues: 21
- Editor(s): Whitney Ellsworth; Jack Schiff

Real Fact Comics is a series of educational American comic books published by three early iterations of DC Comics: World's Best Comics, Inc., Detective Comics, Inc., and National Comics Publications. The series lasted for 21 issues with cover dates from March/April 1946 to July/August 1949. Like most educational comics besides the Parents' Magazine Institute's flagship series, True Comics, the series suffered from poor sales.

== Publication history ==
The educational comic genre emerged as a response to criticism of comic books from a Chicago children's book author, Sterling North. In a May 1940 article for the Chicago Daily News, North referred to comics as "a poisonous mushroom growth", "sex-horror serials", and "graphic insanity". North's suggestion was to replace comic books with other forms of literature, either classic literature, or works of established children's authors. In somewhat of a rebuke to North, the Parents' Magazine Institute created True Comics, the first educational comic, in April 1941. The genre became popular with publishers by 1946, but Real Fact Comics was DC's only effort to enter the field.

Prior to the release of the first issue, DC secured the trademark to Real Fact Comics through an ashcan mockup in February 1946 that reused black and white artwork from the cover of Boy Commandos #1. At least ten copies of the ashcan were produced, though none featured any interior pages.

Jack Kirby and Joe Simon, who would go on to become some of the comics industry's most influential creators, worked on stories in the first two issues of the magazine together, with Kirby returning to draw a story in issue #9. For a time, comics historians believed the third issue contained the first letter column to appear in a DC comic, but older examples have since been found. The sixth issue included a fan letter from science fiction writer Harlan Ellison. While not a professional work, it is his earliest known published writing. In addition to educational material covering historical figures like Harry Houdini and H. G. Wells, the anthology also included some science fiction stories with characters such as Tommy Tomorrow.
