= Benjamin Franklin, Self-Revealed =

Biography of Benjamin Franklin

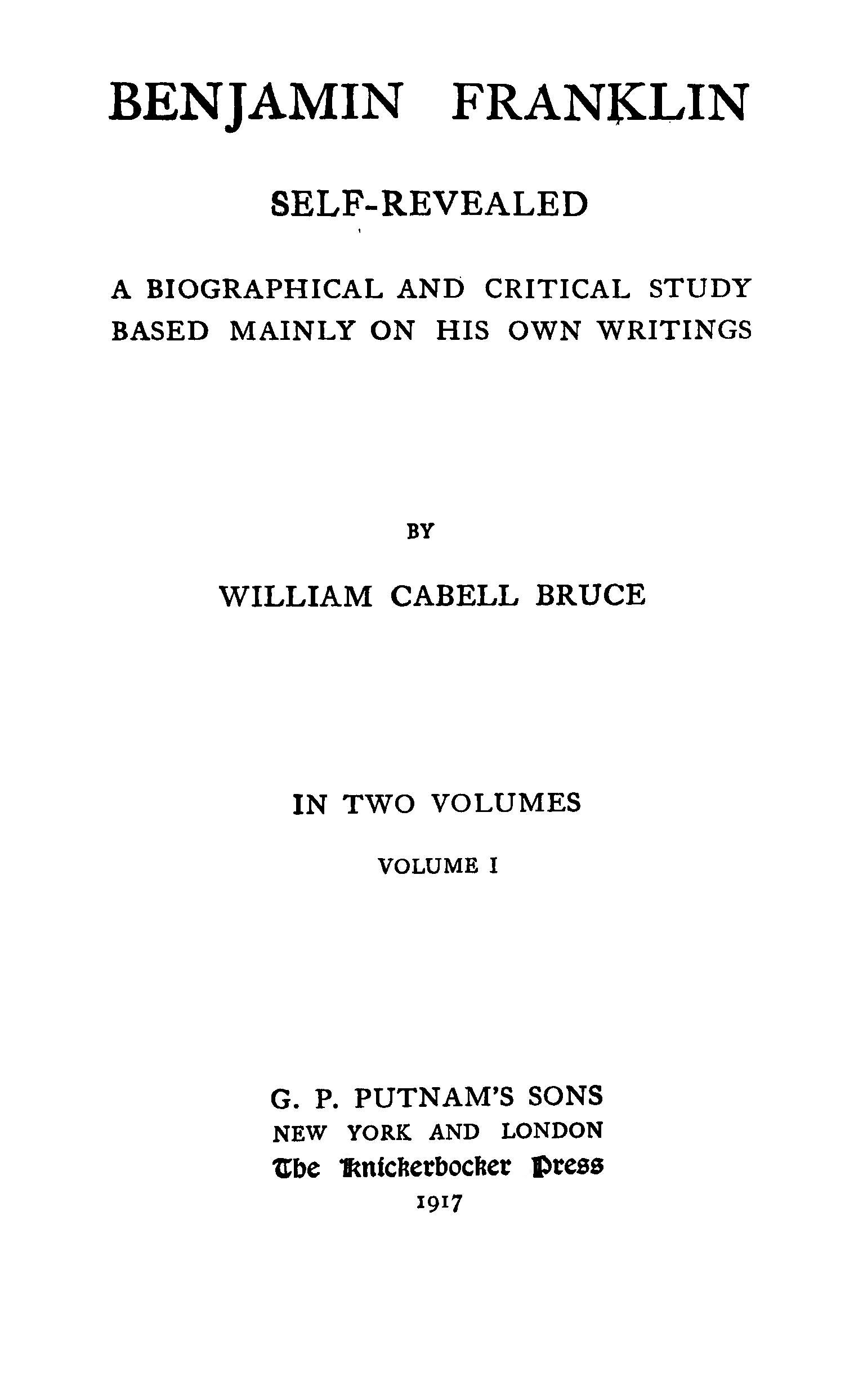
Title page

Benjamin Franklin, Self-Revealed is a biography of Benjamin Franklin written by William Cabell Bruce in 1917. A "biographical and critical study based mostly on Benjamin Franklin's own writings", the book won the Pulitzer Prize for Biography or Autobiography in 1918.

== See also ==
- The Autobiography of Benjamin Franklin
