= Minna Lewinson =

American Pulitzer Prize winner

Minna Lewinson (June 28, 1897 – November 19, 1938) was an American journalist and joint winner of the 1918 Pulitzer Prize for Newspaper History with Henry Beetle Hough. She is notable as the first woman to win a journalism Pulitzer Prize or work for The Wall Street Journal.

== Biography ==
Lewinson was born in New York City in 1897 and attended Barnard College to study journalism, earning a B.Litt. She was one of 11 female graduates of the Columbia University Graduate School of Journalism in 1918, compared to eight men. This was unprecedented at the time, and women were only gaining major access to the school due to a wartime shortage of male journalists.

Lewinson and Henry Beetle Hough were jointly awarded the 1918 Pulitzer Prize for Newspaper History for a research paper, "A History of the Services Rendered to the Public by the American Press During the Year 1917", described by the judges as "the best history of the services rendered to the public by the American press during the preceding year". Lewinson was the first woman to win a journalism Pulitzer Prize.

The prize was worth $1,000, and the particular prize category was only awarded the one time. Jury notes indicate that the prize was considered for awarding every year from the first ceremony in 1917 through to 1924, however the prize was removed from the rosters in 1925 still with only two recipients; Lewinson and Hough.

Lewinson was the first woman hired by the Wall Street Journal, in 1918, working as a copy editor. She left the newspaper in 1923, and no other women were hired by the journal for several more decades. Lewinson also worked as a copy writer, reporter and columnist for Daily Investment News, and as a reporter for Women's Wear Daily.

She died in 1938 at the age of 41 from Hodgkin lymphoma.
