= Jersey City A's =

- Founded in 1978; Jersey City, New Jersey

Minor league affiliations
- Class: Double-A (1978-1979)
- Division: Eastern League

Major league affiliations
- Team: Oakland Athletics (1978)
- Previous teams: Cleveland Indians (1977)

Team data
- Ballpark: Roosevelt Stadium
- Manager: John Kennedy

The Jersey City A's were a minor league baseball team based in Jersey City, New Jersey which played in the Eastern League for the 1978 season and was the AA affiliate of the Oakland Athletics.

== History ==
The team changed their name from the Jersey City Indians after being affiliated with the Cleveland Indians the previous year. After the team's home, Roosevelt Stadium, suffered damage in a winter storm (two light stanchions were toppled and not repaired), the team moved to Waterbury, Connecticut for the 1979 season and became the Waterbury A's. This marked the end of professional baseball in Jersey City, with the stadium being torn down in 1985 for residential development. One notable player on the 1978 A's team was Baseball Hall of Fame member Rickey Henderson. Henderson reportedly called the stadium "a dump" and that "it should have been blown up" (it would indeed be demolished a few years later). The team's franchise was acquired in 1979 and used to revive the Buffalo Bisons, a team from the early days of baseball had sat dormant for the previous nine years.

== Seasons ==
Year	Record	Finish	Manager	Playoffs
1978	54-83	6th	John Kennedy	

== Roster ==
- Mike Norris RHP
- Darrell Woodard 2B
- Rickey Henderson LF
- Rick Lysander RHP

== See also ==
- Jersey City Skeeters
- Jersey City Giants
- Jersey City Jerseys
- Jersey City Indians
