= Jersey City Indians =

Minor league baseball team in Jersey City, New Jersey

The Jersey Indians were a minor league baseball team based in Jersey City, New Jersey, which played in the Eastern League for the 1977 season in Jersey City, New Jersey. They were an AA affiliate of the Cleveland Indians. The team's home stadium was Roosevelt Stadium.

== See also ==
- Jersey City A's
- Jersey City Skeeters
- Jersey City Giants
- Jersey City Jerseys
