= Clara Littledale =

American magazine editor

Clara Savage Littledale
- Born: January 31, 1891; Belfast, Maine, US
- Died: January 9, 1956 (aged 64)
- Education: Smith College, B.A.
- Occupation(s): Magazine Editor; Reporter
- Employer(s): Parents Magazine; Good Housekeeping; New York Post
- Spouse: Harold Aylmer Littledale
- Children: Rosemary Littledale and Harold Littledale, Jr.
- Parent(s): Arthur Savage and Emma (Morrison) Savage

Clara Savage Littledale (January 31, 1891 – January 9, 1956) was an American editor, writer, and reporter known for her work for Good Housekeeping Magazine and Parents Magazine.

== Early life ==
Clara Littledale was born Clara Savage on January 31, 1891 in Belfast, Maine. She was the youngest of five children born to Arthur and Emma (Morrison) Savage, who were of Scottish and Irish ancestry. Arthur Savage was a well educated man, fluent in Latin and Hebrew, who had once been a Methodist minister but had changed his denominational affiliation to become a Unitarian in the late 1870s. Shortly after Clara was born, he moved the family to Medfield, Massachusetts, where he became a Unitarian minister. Clara attended school in Medfield, Massachusetts, but graduated from high school in Plainfield, New Jersey, where the Savage family moved upon Arthur Savage's retirement. Her brother in-law and editor for the New York Post, Charles Selden, inspired Clara's interest in journalism, and she wrote for her high school's magazine.

== Career ==
Clara Littledale attended Smith College in Northampton, Massachusetts, where her interest in journalism continued. While a Smith student, she was a member of the college's Press Board, and wrote articles for major newspapers, including the New York Times, before graduating in 1913. Shortly after graduating, Clara tried her hand at a career in teaching, but was encouraged by a school principal who insisted that she wanted to be a writer and facilitated her career change.

She was shortly hired by the New York Evening Post as their first ever woman reporter, and worked to report on suffrage conventions and parades. Not long after being hired, she was promoted to the position of editor of the woman's page. She stayed at the New York Evening Post for only one year.

In 1914, Littledale accepted the position of press chairman for the National American Woman Suffrage Association (NAWSA). While in that position, Littledale frequently attended and observed suffrage meetings and marched in parades; later in life she would express regret for carrying a banner that read: "If Idiots and Morons Can Vote, Why Can't I?"

By 1915, Littledale's time as press chairman for NAWSA had proved her distaste for publicity work and she left the position to accept a new job as associate editor for Good Housekeeping, where she reported on politics in Washington, D.C., from a woman's perspective. When World War I began, Littledale was posted to France as a reporter for Good Housekeeping, where she reported on the war from a woman's perspective. After six months, her superiors at Good Housekeeping ordered her to return home, to which she famously responded with a telegram that read "Resigning and Remaining."

Clara Littledale returned to the United States in 1920, at which time she married her former coworker at the Evening Post Harold Aylmer Littledale, a Pulitzer Prize-winning reporter who would eventually go on to become the editor of the New York Times. Rosemary Littledale, their daughter, was born in 1922. Clara Littledale continued to write free-lance stories centered themes of marriage and family life, and they were published in journals such as Good Housekeeping, The New Republic, and McCall's.

George J. Hecht, founder of Children, the Magazine for Parents watched Clara Littledale's career with interest, and approached her multiple times about becoming the managing editor of his magazine. She initially refused him to raise her daughter, Rosemary, but eventually agreed to the work if she could work in the office four days a week and spend three days at home with her children. In 1929, the magazine changed its name to Parents Magazine, and Clara Littledale went on to hold the position of editor for thirty years until her death. In her capacity as editor, Clara Littledale wrote often about topics such as discipline, sex education, and character building, and wanted what she wrote to be accessible to the average person. Her parenting philosophy was for parents and children to get along, and as such she advised parents not to be too serious and disciplinarian. She supported parents using their own common sense, and encouraged them not to rely too heavily on the advice of experts, but she often included scientific research on childhood development in her writing. Both Littledale and Hecht were progressives, and as such used their platform to advocate against child labor, as well as for better vocational guidance and training, school lunch programs, nursery and play schools, as well as Federal aid for education. Parents Magazine was incredibly successful under her leadership, reaching one million subscribers by 1946, distributing two million study outlines to mothers' clubs, Parent Teacher Associations, and child study groups, and publishing book-length advice manuals. In her position as editor of Parents Magazine, Littledale also spoke often on the radio and became a familiar voice there, and as such broadened her audience significantly.

During World War II, Littledale raised funds for refugee children from Europe, and held memberships in the Child Study Association of America, the American Association for Adult Education, the National Commission for Mental Hygiene and the National Council of Parent Education.

== Plane crash ==
In February 1941, Clara and Harold Littledale boarded an Eastern Airlines plane in order to take a holiday to Mexico. The plane crashed near Atlanta, Georgia, shortly after midnight on February 27. In the days after the crash, Clara Littledale dictated a report of the crash for Parents Magazine, in which she recounted her realization that the plane was crashing, being pinned under three pine trees, and the several uninjured passengers who left to form a rescue party, which returned at 6 A.M. the following morning. Clara Littledale was relatively unscathed, but her husband Harold was permanently paralyzed. Their already strained marriage became untenable as a result, and they divorced in 1945.

== Death and legacy ==
In 1947, Clara Littledale was diagnosed with cancer, but she continued to work for Parents Magazine through a series of operations and chronic pain. She participated in many events and engagements despite her diagnosis, including attending the White House Conference on Family Life in 1948, speaking at the Mental Hygiene Society Child Welfare Conference in 1949, taking a transcontinental tour in 1950, and traveling to Hawaii as a guest of the United States Navy in 1953. Clara Littledale died in 1956 in New York City having never retired. Her papers are held by Schlesinger Library in Cambridge, Massachusetts.
