= Henry Beetle Hough =

American journalist (1896–1985)

- Born: November 8, 1896; New Bedford, Massachusetts, U.S.
- Died: June 6, 1985 (aged 88); Martha's Vineyard, Massachusetts, U.S.
- Education: Columbia University (B.Litt)
- Occupations: Journalist; publisher
- Employer: Vineyard Gazette

Henry Beetle Hough (November 8, 1896 – June 6, 1985) was an American journalist. He was the owner, editor and publisher of the Vineyard Gazette. Hough was known for winning the Pulitzer Prize for Newspaper History with Minna Lewinson in 1918.

== Early life and education ==
Hough was born and raised in New Bedford, Massachusetts. His father, George A. Hough, was the managing editor of The New Bedford Standard and his mother was Abby Louise Beetle Hough. As a boy, he frequently vacationed on Martha's Vineyard. After high school, he enrolled at Columbia University, where he received his B.Litt. in journalism in 1918 and met his wife, Elizabeth Bowie Hough.

== Career ==
As a student at Columbia University Graduate School of Journalism, Hough wrote a paper with Minna Lewinson, a fellow student, ''History of Service Rendered by the American Press,'' for which in 1918 at the age of 22 he received with her the Pulitzer Newspaper History Award. 1918 was the only year this award was given.

As a wedding present, Hough received the Vineyard Gazette from his father in 1920 and ran the newspaper for 45 years with his wife. He sold the paper to the former executive editor of The New York Times, James Reston, in 1968 but remained an editor and columnist until his death.

His articles and editorials have focused on mundane life such as club meetings, high school athletic events, and church socials as well as preservation of traditional life on the island from commercialization by large corporations such as McDonald's. He was also a conservation activist and led the fight against the demolition of Edgartown Harbor Light in 1938. He donated hundreds of acres of family land to a preserve to prevent development and founded the local land trust, Sheriff's Meadow Foundation, which oversees 2,900 acres of land on the island.

Hough was also the author of 23 books and wrote reviews and articles for The New York Times Magazine, The Saturday Evening Post, and Esquire. His reflections made him the most widely quoted country writer in the nation since William Allen White, while subscribers of the newspaper grew from 600 to 13,000 at his death.

== Selected bibliography ==
- A History of the Services Rendered to the Public by the American Press During the Year 1917 (1918)
- Country Editor - ISBN 9781884592423
- Whaling and Old Salem: A Chronicle of the Sea
- At Christmas All Bells Say the Same
- An Alcoholic to His Sons as Told to Henry Beetle Hough
- Far Out the Coils
- Once More the Thunderer (1950) - ASIN B0006ASF3S
- Singing in the Morning: and other essays about Martha's Vineyard (1951)
- The New England Story (1956)
- Melville in the South Pacific (North Star book #22) (1960)
- The Port (1963)
- Martha's Vineyard: Summer Resort After 100 Years (1966) - ISBN 978-0914960331
- Thoreau of Walden: The Man and His Eventful Life (1970)
- Mostly on Martha's Vineyard: A Personal Record (1975)
- To The Harbor Light (1976)
- Soundings at Sea Level (1980)
- Whaling Wives

== Personal life ==
Hough married his second wife, Edith Sands Graham, in 1979. He died at 88 in Martha's Vineyard and was survived by Graham and his two nephews. He was friends with many celebrities who summered on the island, including actress Katharine Cornell, writers William Styron and Thornton Wilder, artist Thomas Hart Benton, and activist Roger Nash Baldwin.
