= A History of the Civil War, 1861–1865 =

History book by James Ford Rhodes

- Author: James Ford Rhodes
- Genre: Non-fiction
- Publisher: Dover Publications
- Publication place: U.S.
- Pages: 528
- ISBN: 978-0486409009

A History of the Civil War, 1861–1865 is a history book by James Ford Rhodes. It won the Pulitzer Prize for History in 1918. The book is about the American Civil War.
