= His Family =

1917 novel by Ernest Poole

- First edition
- Author: Ernest Poole
- Language: English
- Publisher: Macmillan
- Publication date: May 16, 1917
- Publication place: United States
- Media type: Print
- Pages: 320 (first edition, hardback)

His Family is a novel by Ernest Poole published in 1917 about the life of a New York widower and his three daughters in the 1910s. It received the first Pulitzer Prize for the Novel in 1918.

== Plot introduction ==
His Family tells the story of a middle-class family in New York City in the 1910s. The family's patriarch, widower Roger Gale, struggles to deal with the way his daughters and grandchildren respond to the changing society. Each of his daughters responds in a distinctively different way to the circumstances of their lives, forcing Roger into attempting to calm the increasingly challenging family disputes that erupt.

== Synopsis ==
The story begins in the spring of 1913 with Roger Gale, a New York businessman and a widower, owner of a media monitoring service, reflecting on the changes that have come to New York since his arrival in the city as a young man from a New Hampshire farm somewhere near the time of the Civil War. He is driven by his wife's dying request to remain close to their three daughters, yet he feels very distant from them—this despite the fact that the younger two (Deborah, a school principal, and Laura) live in the family home with him, and Edith, who is married with four children, visits him regularly.

The early conflicts within the family largely surround Laura's sudden announcement of her engagement to Hal Sloane, a young businessman who is generally unknown to the family, and Edith's pregnancy, as her fifth child arrives weeks before his due date, endangering her life. After the baby's birth and Laura's wedding (and subsequent honeymoon to Europe), Roger's concerns turn to the one daughter remaining at home. Deborah works constantly at her school, and spends her free hours agitating for reforms and financial support to help the families living in the tenements. Roger is disturbed by this, especially given his prejudices against the immigrant families Deborah works with, but a visit to Deborah's school changes his perspective. He takes a crippled Irish boy named John into his care, providing him with lodging and a job in Roger's news clipping office downtown.

When summer arrives, the family goes to spend most of it on the old family farm in New Hampshire. At the farm, Edith's oldest son, George, is happiest, pursuing his interest in becoming a farmer someday; Edith's husband, Bruce Cunningham, spends most of his time racing around the backroads on his brand-new automobile.

That following winter, Roger becomes concerned about his daughter, Deborah, whose suitor Allan Baird, a doctor and friend of the family, seems to be giving up hope of marriage. Roger conspires with his daughter Edith and her husband Bruce to pressure Deborah, and she eventually accepts Allan's proposal (with the caveat that they wait until the end of the school year, so that a long honeymoon in Europe can be enjoyed).

Before the date of the wedding is reached, Bruce is struck by a taxi while standing next to his car in the street. After his death, Edith and her children are forced to return to the family home, until Roger arranges for their return to New Hampshire and the family farm. Deborah's wedding to Allan is delayed as a consequence—she asks him to wait until August. The end of July, however, brings the onset of World War I, and Roger's business loses many of its clients. As a result, he can barely afford to support the family, taking out a mortgage on the home to make ends meet, and Deborah chooses to delay her wedding again until the spring.

Given the family's financial straits, Edith's children have to be removed from their expensive private school and tutored from home by Edith herself. After weeks of this, Edith resolves to sell most of her possessions, and use the money for the children's school tuition. Edith also discovers that John, the Irish boy living in the home, has tuberculosis and orders Roger to send him away, which Deborah arranges for her father.

Laura, who has been largely absent from family affairs, returns suddenly to the house, arriving with luggage and refusing to see anyone but her sister, Deborah. Her husband, Hal Sloane, has made a large amount of money through war profiteering, but she has fallen in love with his business partner, an Italian, and Hal intends to divorce her, publicly or privately, as a detective has brought him "proofs" that Laura has been unfaithful to him. Roger, who initially resists the divorce, relents when he learns of his daughter's indiscretions, and she elopes with her lover soon thereafter.

As their money troubles worsen, Roger is forced to sell his antique ring collection to cover the family's bills, and tensions increase between Deborah and Edith over money: Deborah raises large amounts of money for "her family" of tenement schoolchildren, and Edith feels it's wrong of her not to devote her energies to the care of her niece and nephews. Edith is also very hostile to Deborah's "modern" ideas about women's suffrage, and the resulting arguments are very stressful on Roger.

When Roger learns that Deborah has ended her engagement to Allan Baird, he intervenes, informing her that he is fatally ill, and pleading with her to make a life for herself beyond her school. He intends to sell the family home, use most of the funds to set up the family farm in New Hampshire so that George (now 17) can become a farmer and support his mother and siblings, and prepare for death. After she agrees to marry Allan, Roger finds good fortune at last: John, the Irish boy who works for him, discovers a new source of clients and saves the business (and with it, the family home).

Roger lives out the end of his days watching Deborah and Allan settle down happily together and have their first child. John, who a doctor had said would never live past 30, falls ill and passes away suddenly, and soon thereafter, Roger falls ill for the final time himself. All of his daughters return to him to make their peace (even Laura, whose new husband allows her to find and reacquire Roger's prized collection of rings), and Roger dies feeling finally connected to his family, as his wife had hoped.

== Characters in His Family ==
- Roger Gale, a New York businessman in his early 60s
- Edith Gale Cunningham, Roger's oldest daughter, in her early 30s
- Bruce Cunningham, Edith's husband (a "financial surgeon" who manages bankrupt businesses)
- George Cunningham, Bruce and Edith's oldest son, in his late teens
- Elizabeth "Betsy" Cunningham, Bruce and Edith's only daughter
- Deborah Gale Baird, Roger's middle daughter, a school principal
- Allan Baird, Deborah's husband, a successful doctor who leaves his practice to treat families living in the tenements
- Laura Gale Sloane, Roger's youngest daughter
- Hal Sloane, Laura's first husband
- John "Johnny" Geer, a crippled Irish boy who comes to work for Roger

== Literary significance and reception ==
His Family was praised by many critics at the time of its publication. The Oakland Tribune, in its review on May 27, 1917, wrote "in this story of Roger Gale's family, Ernest Poole has pictured remarkably well present-day Americans. It is significant, intellectual and stimulating--a story of today." The New York Times profiled the book in its review of "notable fiction" for 1917, calling it "a fine successor to The Harbor (Poole's first novel)."

When Poole's first novel, The Harbor, came out in 1915, it was a critical and popular success but the Pulitzer Prize did not yet exist. When his second novel His Family came out in 1918, the "consensus is that it’s the lesser of the two works, that the Pulitzer committee was really honoring Poole for The Harbor".

== References to actual history, geography and current science ==
His Family makes frequent reference to details of life in New York City in the 1910s, particularly to the details of life for the impoverished immigrants whose children attend Deborah's school. George's fascination with "modern" farming, and his subsequent conversations, offer some details about how the farming of livestock was changing at the time. Finally, the impact of World War I on the business community, the immigrant community, and the lives of families is described in some detail, although few details are given regarding specific wartime incidents (battles, the sinking of passenger ships, etc.).

== Awards and nominations ==
- The Pulitzer Prize for the Novel, 1918

== Publication history ==
- 1917, U.S., The Macmillan Co., pub date 16 May 1917, hardback
- 1999, U.S., Buccaneer Books ISBN 0-89968-100-X, hardback

=== First edition points ===
Published: May 1917; Verso: copyright 1917, the Macmillan Company; Recto: 1917; boards: blue embossed cloth; DJ: $1.50
