= James Ford Rhodes =

American industrialist and historian (1848–1927)

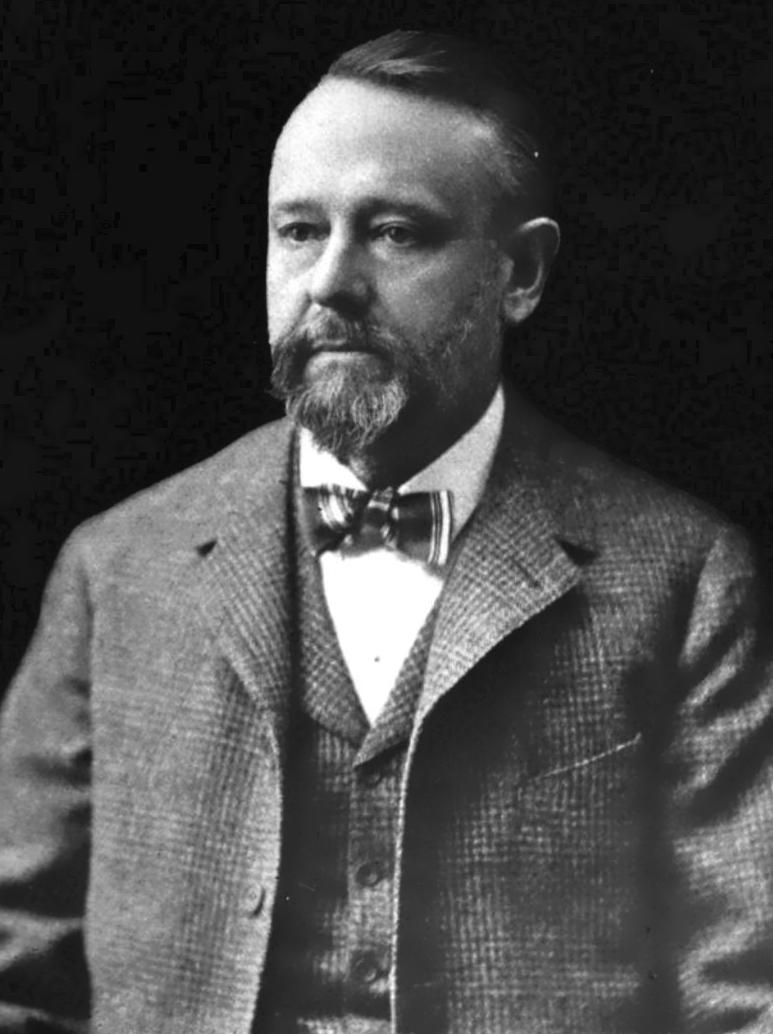
- Rhodes in 1902
- Born: May 1, 1848; Cleveland, Ohio, U.S.
- Died: January 22, 1927 (aged 78); Brookline, Massachusetts, U.S.
- Education: New York University; Collège de France
- Notable work: A History of the Civil War, 1861-1865
- Awards: Pulitzer Prize for History (1918)

14th President of the American Historical Association
- In office 1899
- Preceded by: George Park Fisher
- Succeeded by: Edward Eggleston

James Ford Rhodes (May 1, 1848 – January 22, 1927), was an American industrialist and historian born in Cleveland, Ohio. After earning a fortune in the iron, coal, and steel industries by 1885, he retired from business to devote time to historical research. He wrote a seven-volume history of the United States from 1850, initially published from 1893 to 1906 with an eighth volume added in 1920. Another book, A History of the Civil War, 1861–1865 (1918), won the second-ever Pulitzer Prize for History.

== Early life and education ==
Cleveland was a center of the Connecticut Western Reserve, heavily settled by New Englanders like his parents. His father Daniel P. Rhodes was a Democrat and a friend of Stephen A. Douglas. He opposed the Lincoln administration during the Civil War; Rhodes said he was a "Copperhead." That caused problems for his sister, who was finally allowed to marry the up-and-coming Republican businessman-politician Mark Hanna.

Rhodes attended New York University, beginning in 1865. After graduation, he went to Europe, studying at the Collège de France. During his studies in Europe, he visited ironworks and steelworks. After his return to the United States, he investigated iron and coal deposits for his father.

== Career ==
In 1874, Rhodes entered his father's highly profitable iron, coal, and steel businesses at Cleveland. Having earned a considerable fortune, he retired in 1885.

Rhodes moved to Boston for access to its libraries and supportive intellectual community. He devoted the rest of his life to historical research and writing. He was never politically active. In evaluating the two parties in the Reconstruction era he generally supported the Republican Party. In the 1880s he was a Bourbon Democrat who supported Grover Cleveland and favored low tariffs, despite his own connection with the iron and steel industry. He supported Republicans William McKinley in 1896 and Theodore Roosevelt in 1904. In 1912 he supported Woodrow Wilson, a Democrat. He supported Wilson's position calling for American entry in the League of Nations. Rhodes told his grandson that he started life "as a strong Democrat, then became a strong Republican, then a lukewarm Democrat, and now I suppose I am a lukewarm Republican." His gyrations are important because one of the strongest features of his multi-volume history is the valuation of both political parties, finding both strengths and weaknesses in each party.

His major work, History of the United States from the Compromise of 1850, was published in seven volumes, 1893–1906; the eight-volume edition appeared in 1920. His single volume, History of the Civil War, 1861–1865 (1917), earned him a Pulitzer Prize in History in 1918.

Rhodes joined the American Historical Association and was elected its president in 1899 for a one-year term.

== Historical approach ==
Rhodes focused on national politics. Working from newspaper accounts and published memoirs, Rhodes tracked the process by which major national decisions were made. He evaluated the strengths and weaknesses of major leaders. He detailed corruption he found in the Reconstruction Republican governments in Washington, D.C., and the Southern states. He said that granting of unqualified suffrage to blacks after emancipation was a mistake and added to problems during Reconstruction.

Rhodes's interpretation of the role of slavery strongly influenced intellectual opinion and historiography. Unlike the first generation of historians, who had been personally deeply committed on the slavery issue, Rhodes approached it dispassionately. He argued that slavery was the main cause of the war. What he meant was an abstract political-economic system that voters and politicians put into position. He paid relatively little attention to slaves themselves, focusing on how the politicians and the foreigners used the issue to their advantage. He argued:

The judgment of posterity is made up: it was an unrighteous cause which the South defended by arms; and the tribunal of modern civilization, Calhoun and Davis must be held accountable for the misery which resulted from this appeal to the sword.

By misery he referred to the casualties, deaths, and hardships during the war, not to the miseries of the slaves before the war. He argued it was an irrepressible conflict, that is an inevitable war by December 1860 that perhaps could have been delayed, but would happen sooner or later. For Rhodes, slavery was practically the only cause of the war, and he ridiculed "Lost Cause" Southerners who justified rebellion as an exercise of the right of revolution in the face of Yankee oppression. He rejected the Calhoun notion of state sovereignty. The issue, he argued, was that the South fought to extend slavery – an institution condemned by ethics, Christianity, and the modern world. Rhodes treated slavery as a calamity for the South, but not a personal issue for white Southerners, who he thought deserved sympathy rather than censure. The South was associated with slavery because of a long chain of events going back centuries. Rhodes downplayed the importance of the abolitionist movement, instead focusing on mainstream leaders such as Daniel Webster for his promoting a deeper nationalism. Pressley says, "it was Webster's principle of 'Liberty and Union' which won in the Civil War, not Garrison's principle of 'no union with slaveholders.'

== Reception ==
Sharp criticism came from John R. Lynch, a black leader in Mississippi's Reconstruction who had served in Congress. Lynch said:

So far as the Reconstruction period is concerned, it is not only inaccurate and unreliable but it is the most biased, partisan and prejudiced historical work I have ever read....He believed it was a grave mistake to have given the colored men at the South the right to vote, and in order to make the alleged historical facts harmonize with his own views upon this point, he took particular pains to magnify the virtues and minimize the faults of the Democrats and to magnify the faults and minimize the virtues of the Republicans, the colored men especially.""

Rhodes said that giving the vote to blacks was an attack on civilization. Lynch replied that the laws allowed time for transition away from the society that was built on slavery: "But for the adoption of the Congressional plan of Reconstruction and the subsequent legislation of the nation along the same line, the abolition of slavery through the ratification of the 13th Amendment would have been in name only, a legal and constitutional myth." Rhodes concluded that Reconstruction had failed. Lynch disagreed. While not all its goals had been accomplished, ratification of the 14th and 15th Amendments made it a success, as all people of color were granted citizenship, which could not be restricted by race or color, and they were granted suffrage nationally. Lynch argued that, "The failure of the Reconstruction legislation was not due so much to the change of sentiment in the North as an unwise interpretation of these laws."

Rhodes has been described as one of the major scholars who gave "authoritative support to the Southern interpretation of history...[and] assumed the inferiority of the Negro...Rhodes, for example, in Volume VI of his monumental History of the United States, speaks of the freedmen as being 'Three and a half million of one of the most inferior races of mankind.'"

== Legacy and honors ==
- 1900, Rhodes was elected a member of the American Antiquarian Society.
- 1901, Rhodes was awarded the Loubat Prize of the Berlin Academy of Sciences.
- 1910, he was awarded the gold medal of the National Institute of Arts and Letters.
- Oxford and several United States universities gave him honorary degrees.
- James Ford Rhodes High School in Cleveland was named for him.

== Bibliography: Books and articles by Rhodes ==
- "The Battle of Gettysburg." American Historical Review 4#4 1899, pp. 665–677. online
- "Sherman's March to the Sea" American Historical Review 6#3 (1901) pp. 466–474 online
- History of the Civil War, 1861–1865 (1918), one-volume version; Pulitzer Prize online
- History of the United States from the Compromise of 1850 to the McKinley-Bryan Campaign of 1896 - Vol. 1
- History of the United States from the Compromise of 1850 to the McKinley-Bryan Campaign of 1896 - Vol. 2
- History of the United States from the Compromise of 1850 to the McKinley-Bryan Campaign of 1896 - Vol. 3
- History of the United States from the Compromise of 1850 to the McKinley-Bryan Campaign of 1896 - Vol. 4
- History of the United States from the Compromise of 1850 to the McKinley-Bryan Campaign of 1896 - Vol. 5
- History of the United States from the Compromise of 1850 to the McKinley-Bryan Campaign of 1896 - Vol. 6
- History of the United States from the Compromise of 1850 to the McKinley-Bryan Campaign of 1896 - Vol. 7
- History of the United States from the Compromise of 1850 to the McKinley-Bryan Campaign of 1896 - Vol. 8
- The McKinley and Roosevelt Administrations, 1897–1909 (1922)
- Historical Essays (1909)
- Lectures on the American Civil War (1913), delivered at Oxford University in 1913.
- History of the Civil War, 1861–1865 (1918), won the Pulitzer Prize for History; It is a completely rewritten history of the war.
