= Parents (magazine) =

American parenting magazine (1926–2022)

- Editor in Chief: Julia Edelstein
- Categories: Parenting
- Frequency: Monthly
- Total circulation: 2,215,645 (2011)
- Founded: October 1926
- Final issue: April 2022
- Company: People Inc.
- Country: United States
- Based in: New York City
- Language: English
- Website: parents.com
- ISSN: 1083-6373

Parents was a digital media site, formerly run as an American monthly magazine, founded in 1926 that featured scientific information on child development geared to help parents in raising their children. Subscribers were notified of the magazine's dissolution via a postcard mailing in March 2022.

== History ==
The magazine was started by George J. Hecht in 1926. The magazine was originally titled Children, The Magazine for Parents. Hecht hired Clara Savage Littledale to be its first editor. The first issue was published in October 1926 and soon was selling 100,000 copies a month. Beginning with the August 1929 issue, the name was changed to Parents' Magazine (with an apostrophe). Littledale was followed as editor by Mary Buchanan. In 1937, the magazine was granted trademark registration for the mark Parents' Magazine.

From 1941 to 1965, Parents' Magazine Press published a line of comic books and magazines heavily featuring comics, including such long-running titles as Calling All Girls, Children's Digest, Polly Pigtails, True Comics, and True Picture-Magazine. Parents Magazine Press also published Humpty Dumpty from the 1950s through the early 1980s, until it and Children's Digest were sold to The Saturday Evening Post company.

Parents' Magazine was sold to Gruner + Jahr in 1978. At that time, the magazine was "relaunched" and its name was shortened, utilizing only the word "Parents", without an apostrophe. Elizabeth Crow became the magazine's editor for the next decade, before being replaced by Ann Pleshette Murphy, who was editor-in-chief between 1988 and 1998, and a contributing editor from 1998 to 2002.

In 1992, Gruner + Jahr filed suit against Meredith for trademark infringement of Parents when Meredith published Parent's Digest. With the court finding no actual confusion of the products (though there was testimony from managers and employees as to inquiries about a possible relationship between the publications), the case was dismissed.

Meredith acquired Parents magazine when Gruner + Jahr left the US magazine business in 2005. Sally Lee was the editor from 1998 to 2008. Dana Points was editor-in-chief from 2008 to 2016. The Meredith Corporation would later be acquired by IAC in 2021.

In February 2022, it was revealed that Parents would end print publication and switch to an all-digital format.

== Profile ==
Parents editorial focus is on the daily needs and concerns of mothers with young children. The monthly features information about child health, safety, behavior, discipline and education. There are also stories on women's health, nutrition, pregnancy, marriage, and beauty. It is aimed primarily at women ages 18–35 with young children.

Columns include "As They Grow," which covers age-specific child development issues, as well as the reader-generated "Baby Bloopers," "It Worked for Me," and "Goody Bag." The magazine produces a website, an iPhone app for kids, Parents Flash Cards, and GoodyBlog.com, the later-defunct blog.

With its historical reach, Parents has frequently been used by academics to document social and cultural shifts over time. Melissa Milkie and Kathleen Denny described the prominence of the magazine:

The magazine's goal of disseminating scientific knowledge of all types concerning children's development and family life in general, proved to be very popular. The magazine was the only U.S. periodical whose circulation rose during the Great Depression, and during the 1930s and 1940s, it was proclaimed as the most popular advice periodical in the world (Schlossman, 1985). By 1971, PM claimed in its pages to have counseled mothers and fathers in the 'rearing of more than 100 million children,' attesting to its prominence"

Despite its gender-neutral title, the magazine's advice has implicitly been directed toward women. On the February 2019 cover it featured a same-sex male couple, the first in its history.

The magazine received criticism for featuring a bored white child who appears to be screaming, dressed in a toy headdress on its January 2016 cover. Dr. Debbie Reese of American Indians in Children's Literature (AICL) called the depiction racist, as it implies a "wild Indian" stereotype.

== Medal for "Movie of the Month" ==
Each month, Parents' Magazine would award a medal to a "Movie of the Month". The image of the "Movie of the Month" Medal was subsequently used on movie posters and lobby cards. Past recipients include:

- The Adventures of Huckleberry Finn (March 1939)
- The Wizard of Oz (September 1939)
- Pinocchio (December 1939)
- Kathleen (January 1942)
- They Were Expendable (December 1943)
- Son of Lassie (May 1945)
- Alice in Wonderland (July 1951)
- Hansel and Gretel (October 1954)
