= Baruch: My Own Story =

- Author: Bernard M. Baruch
- Subject: Finance, War
- Published: Henry Holt, 1957
- Media type: Print
- Pages: 337

Baruch: My Own Story a memoir of Bernard Mannes Baruch, which he put together himself, originally published by Henry Holt in 1957. It has been republished in two volumes by Buccaneer Books in 1993.

== Synopsis ==
It tells his story as a public servant and—prior to that—his financial success on Wall Street. The book starts off detailing Baruch's parents' lives and growing up in South Carolina and then the family's move to New York. At that point—when Baruch was 10—his physician father became a leader in the beginnings of public sanitation and physical therapy.

In 1891, Baruch "made it" on Wall Street, becoming an employee at A. A. Housman, where he worked for more than 10 years. Thereafter he relinquished his Stock Exchange seat, left Wall Street and sold all his stocks upon his appointment to the War Industries Board by President Woodrow Wilson in 1918.

== Background ==
Baruch completed this book when he was 87 years old. According to blogger Javier Gonzalez, Baruch was different to his contemporaries in the market as he had "a healthy detachment from monetary gains," enabling him to make more detached decisions than his contemporaries. Being a balanced individual he was able to get more rewards than the stereotypical Wall Streeter who is often self-centered and only focused on their own wealth and well-being. This book depicts how he "made it" without succumbing to this potential downfall.
