= My Style =

2011 book by Dannii Minogue

- Hardcover edition
- Author: Dannii Minogue
- Language: English
- Subject: Dannii Minogue
- Genre: Non-fiction, memoir
- Publisher: Simon & Schuster
- Publication date: September 2011; October 2011 (Australia)
- Publication place: United Kingdom
- Media type: Hardcover; Digital (eBook)
- Pages: 256 pages
- ISBN: 978-1-84983-868-9
- Preceded by: My Story

My Style is a fashion and self-help book written by the Australian entertainer Dannii Minogue, released in September 2011.

In this book, Minogue shares her fashion wisdom and personal style secrets, backed up by an all-new photoshoot. Dannii talks about loving you the way you are, focusing on ways to accentuate the positive, and covers everything from great hair and glowing skin to make-up and embracing a healthy exercise regime. She also shares her tips on red carpet looks and what to wear for every occasion, and offers advice on dressing for your shape and choosing the right accessories. My Style is a guide to making the most of what you've got and looking your best.

A special enhanced edition of the digital eBook was released on iTunes featuring the book and two behind-the-scenes videos.
