= My Story (Minogue book) =

2010 book by Dannii Minogue

- Hardcover edition
- Author: Dannii Minogue; Terry Ronald
- Language: English
- Subject: Dannii Minogue
- Genre: Non-fiction, memoir
- Publisher: Simon & Schuster
- Publication date: 30 September 2010 (Hardcover); 31 March 2011(Paperback)
- Publication place: United Kingdom
- Media type: Hardcover; Paperback; Digital (eBook)
- Pages: 486 pages
- ISBN: 978-0-85720-052-5
- Followed by: My Style

My Story is a memoir by Australian singer Dannii Minogue. Written in the United Kingdom and Australia with the help of long-time friend Terry Ronald, the book was released in September 2010 in the UK and in October 2010 in Australia.

Having admitted that 2009 has been a life changing year, Dannii felt it was time to put pen to paper and tell it all about the ups and downs of her 38-year life. The pregnancy and arrival of her first son, Ethan, also encouraged her to write the book.

Minogue has used this opportunity to reveal the truth behind her divorce to Julian McMahon and the arguments between her and Sharon Osbourne while on The X Factor in 2007 when Minogue first joined the panel.

The book was serialised by the Daily Mail newspaper in the UK, prior to its release on 30 September.

A paperback edition, featuring an all-new epilogue chapter, was released on 31 March 2011.

== Reception ==
The Evening Standard dismissed the book: "Considered a snip for an advance of just £300,000, this one proves to be a snore." Writing for The West Australian, in her short review Amanda Keenan indicating that the biography is "fascinating" and makes Dannii Minogue "likeable". The reviewer for the Sydney Morning Herald, Andrew Hornery, noted that "the tome will probably never make into the annals of the great literary contributions of our time".
