= George J. Hecht =

American magazine publisher

George Joseph Hecht (November 1, 1895 – April 23, 1980) was the founder and publisher of Parents magazine and owner of FAO Schwarz. He is often credited with creating the parenting advice industry through his many publications.

== Life and career ==
Hecht was born in New York City in 1895 in a home that once stood on the site of Radio City. He attended the Ethical Culture School and graduated from Cornell University in 1917. With the outbreak of World War I, he became volunteer head of the financial department of New York's office of the American Ambulance Field Service and worked as a civilian for various war-related efforts, such as promoting the sale of Liberty Bonds and conducting research for the War Trade Board. He became head of the Bureau of Cartoons, encouraging cartoonists to publish work in support of the war effort, and he published a collection of war cartoons titled The War in Cartoons. Although he joined the United States Army as a private in 1918, he was not called to active service.

After the war, Hecht edited Better Times, a monthly social welfare publication, which he turned into an influential weekly representing two thousand private and public charitable agencies. In 1925, he organized the Welfare Council of New York City. In 1938, he became founding secretary of the Greater New York Fund, which eventually merged with United Way of New York.

Concerned about a lack of resources on parenting, Hecht received funding from the Laura Spelman Rockefeller Memorial Foundation to launch Parents magazine in September 1926. He asked Clara Savage Littledale multiple times to serve as the magazine's editor; she agreed in 1926 and would serve as editor until her death in 1956. The magazine quickly became the most widely circulated magazine dedicated to parenting in the world, leading Hecht to launch a variety of other journals aimed at parents and children, including The Boy's and Girl's Newspaper, Your New Baby, Children's Digest, and Humpty Dumpty, which became the most popular children's magazine in the United States.

In 1963, Hecht expanded his interest in children and toys by having Parents magazine purchase FAO Schwarz from the Schwarz family. He expanded the New York toy store nationwide by opening sixteen branches before selling the company in 1970. Hecht sponsored a training course for Santa Claus impersonators at the toy store.

Hecht served as chairman of Child Welfare League of America, established and chaired the American Parents Committee in 1947, and chaired the National Committee on the Observance of Mother's Day. He advocated for various acts of federal legislation related to children and education, including the National Defense Education Act of 1958. Hecht also philanthropically supported programs related to world population control.

Hecht died in 1980 at the age of 84. He was named one of the "100 Most Notable Cornellians" in 2003.
