= Ernest Poole =

American journalist and novelist (1880–1950)

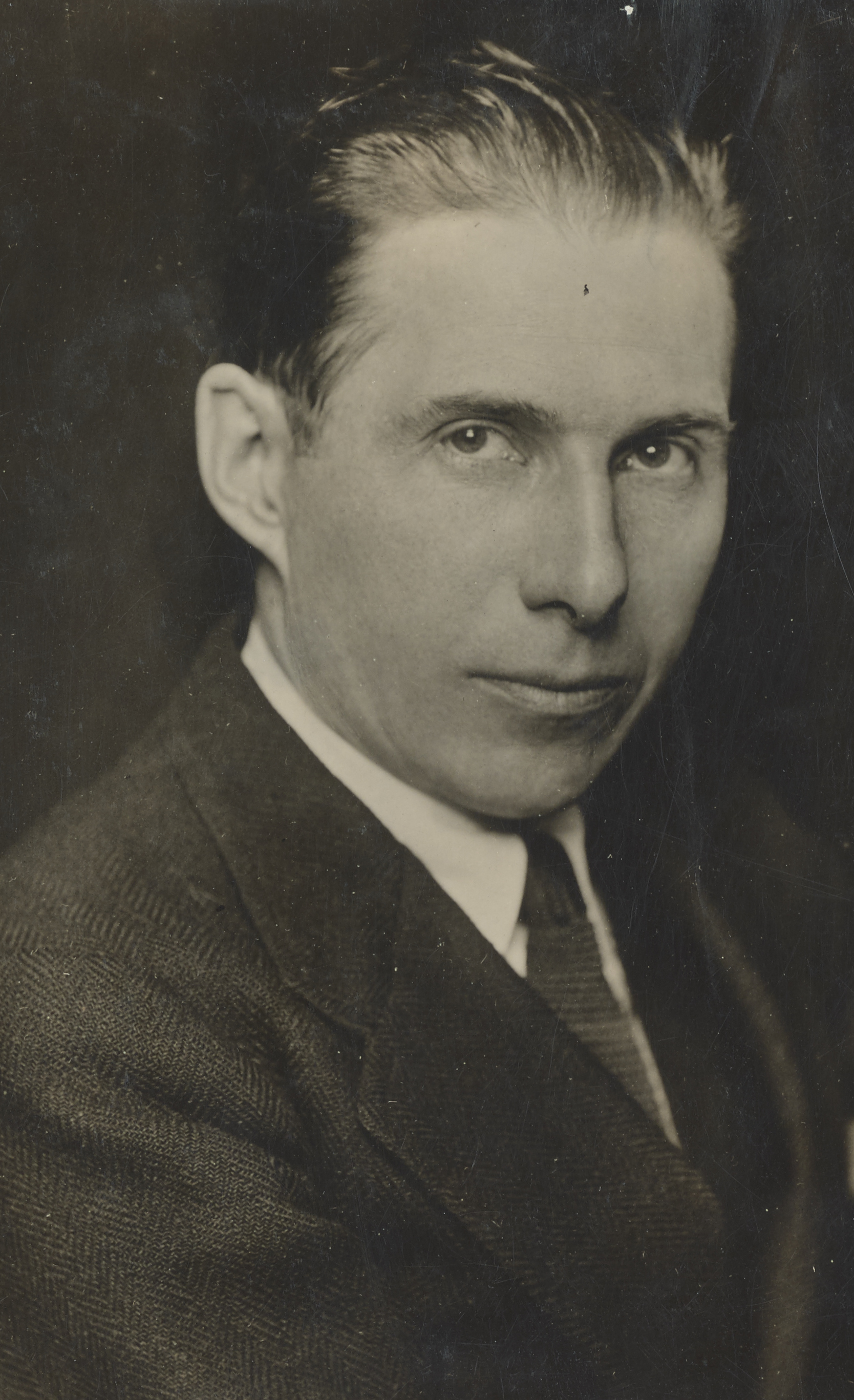
- Born: Ernest Cook Poole; January 23, 1880; Chicago, Illinois, U.S.
- Died: January 10, 1950 (aged 69); New York City
- Education: Princeton University (BA)
- Writing career
- Notable works: The Harbor (1915); His Family (1917)
- Notable awards: Pulitzer Prize for Fiction (1918)

Ernest Cook Poole (January 23, 1880 – January 10, 1950) was an American journalist, novelist, and playwright. Poole is best remembered for his sympathetic first-hand reportage of revolutionary Russia during and immediately after the Revolution of 1905 and Revolution of 1917 and as a popular writer of proletarian-tinged fiction during the era of World War I and the 1920s.

Poole was the winner of the first Pulitzer Prize for Fiction, awarded in 1918 for his book, His Family.

== Biography ==
=== Early years ===
Poole was born in Chicago, Illinois, on January 23, 1880, to Abram Poole and Mary Howe Poole. His Wisconsin-born father was a successful commodities trader at the Chicago Board of Trade, his mother hailed from a well-established Chicago family; together they raised 7 children.

Poole was educated at home until he was almost 7 years old, at which time he was enrolled in Chicago's University School for Boys. There he first showed a proclivity for the written word, working briefly on the staff of the school newspaper. His was a privileged youth, spending summers at the family's seasonal home at Lake Forest, on the shores of Lake Michigan. The family's Michigan Avenue home in Chicago was populated with servants, including gardeners and governesses, and he grew up in proximity of the scions of the city elite, including young relatives of Cyrus McCormick and Abraham Lincoln.

Following high school graduation, Poole, an accomplished violinist, took a year off to study music, with a view to becoming a professional composer. He found the process of writing music difficult, however, and — inspired by his literary-oriented and story-telling father — turned his attention to the written word as a possible profession.

After his year-long escape from formal education, Poole moved to Princeton, New Jersey, to attend Princeton University, where he attended courses in political science taught by Woodrow Wilson. There he continued to demonstrate an interest in journalism and fiction writing, working on the staff of the school's daily newspaper, The Prince — before finding straight journalism tedious. He moved from nuts-and-bolts journalism to the arts, contributing material to the campus literary magazine, The Lit, and penning two librettos for the illustrious Princeton Triangle Club, although both were rejected.

It was at Princeton that Poole was influenced to the ideas of progressive reform associated with the burgeoning muckraker movement, with the book How The Other Half Lives by Jacob Riis playing a particularly pivotal role in the evolution of Poole's worldview. He also read translations of Russian classics by Leo Tolstoy and Ivan Turgenev, which deeply impressed Poole for their realistic style and aroused what would become a lifelong interest in him in the authors' native land.

=== Settlement worker ===
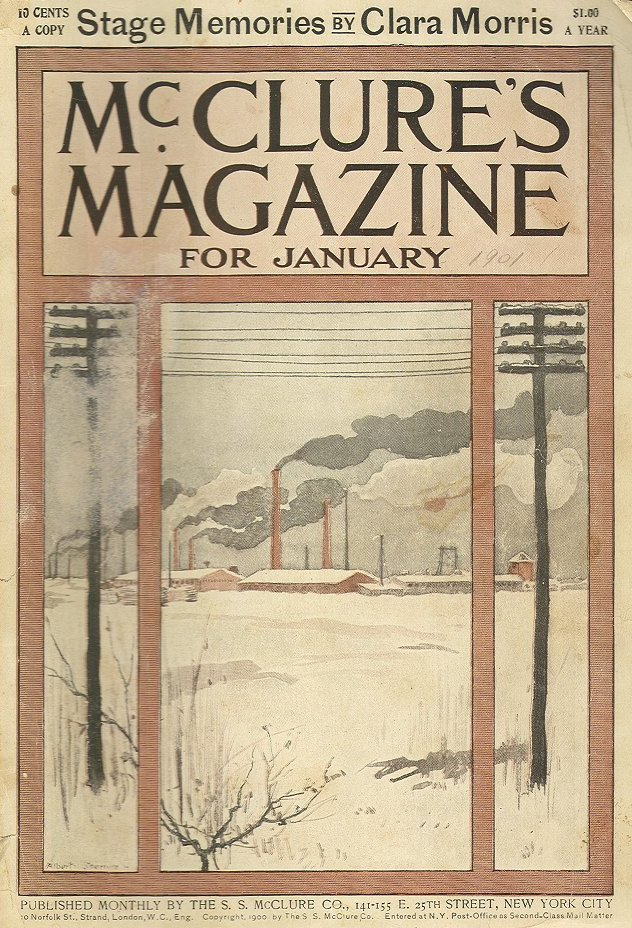
Poole began his journalistic career writing freelance articles for the muckraking monthly McClure's Magazine.

Poole graduated from Princeton cum laude in 1902 and immediately moved to New York City to live in the University Settlement House on the city's impoverished Lower East Side. During his stint as a settlement worker, Poole gained the notice of editors at McClure's Magazine for an article he wrote on the social situation in New York's Chinatown district and authored a report for the New York Child Labor Committee on the continuing child labor problem.

Pushed by the Child Labor Committee to seek publicity by rewriting some of his lurid anecdotes of the life of street urchins, Poole wrote an article that early in 1903 found its way into the fledgling muckraking magazine, McClure's. Payment for the freelance effort was received and confidence boosted. The next phase of Poole's life, that of a professional writer, had begun.

Headstrong and confident, Poole immersed himself in his passion, fiction, while still ensconced as a settlement worker. Three short stories were immediately penned and sent out to various New York magazines — only to be returned with letters of rejection. Poole retreated to writing short works of investigative journalism on the boys of the city streets and met with better success, seeing print for one piece in Collier's and two others in the New York Evening Post.

Poole's settlement house was active teaching classes and housing club groups during the day. In the evenings it hosted a steady stream of guests, including some of the most famous progressive activists of the day, including social worker Jane Addams, journalist Lincoln Steffens, British author H. G. Wells and left wing politicians Keir Hardie and Ramsay MacDonald, as well as renowned attorney Clarence Darrow. Acquaintances were made and ideas absorbed by Poole, who increased in commitment to attempt to the wrongs of society through intelligent social reform.

Because he wanted to understand the Lower East Side community better, Poole started learning Yiddish and secretly listened to conversations, writing down pieces of dialogue to use later in his creative writing. He befriended Abraham Cahan, the publisher of the Yiddish-language Jewish Daily Forward (Der Forverts) and through him developed an appreciation for the revolutionary struggle of oppressed Jews and others against the Tsarist regime in Russia.

The turning point in Poole's work as a settlement worker happened when he was chosen to investigate tuberculosis in the tenement slums of New York City's Lower East Side. Poole spent weeks going from room to room observing and surveying residents and taking testimony about the fate of previous inhabitants. Poole's report, "The Plague in Its Stronghold" attracted media attention. He guided reporters and photographers through the tenement districts, and the resulting coverage led the New York State Legislature in Albany to hold hearings. The task placed a strain on Poole's mental and physical health. He became feverish and was sent home to the family summer home in Lake Forest to recuperate.

=== Magazine correspondent ===
Margaret Ann Witherbotham Poole, to whom Ernest Poole was married in 1907. The couple raised three children.

Poole's time as a settlement worker at an end, he threw himself into investigative journalism. In 1904 the popular illustrated news weekly The Outlook dispatched Poole to live for six weeks in the packinghouse district of Chicago to report on the ongoing stockyards' strike, which prominently featured a melange of striking new immigrants from Southern and Eastern Europe against thousands of African-American strikebreakers brought for the purpose to the city.

When his Outlook piece was completed, Poole stayed on the scene as the volunteer press agent for the union of the striking slaughterhouse workers. The job put him in touch with the young Upton Sinclair, who was on the scene to do research for what he hoped would become the "Uncle Tom's Cabin of the Labor Movement," published in 1906 as The Jungle. Poole's close friends in New York included two others who would travel to Imperial Russia as correspondents in 1905 — the socialists Arthur Bullard and William English Walling.

Back in New York, Poole met the émigré Russian revolutionary Yekaterina Breshkovskaya, the so-called "Little Grandmother of the Revolution." Together with an interpreter and a stenographer, Poole sat for eight hours listening to Breshkovskaya's personal story and the history of the revolutionary movement fighting for the overthrow of the Romanov dynasty of Imperial Russia. Poole's interview would ultimately result in a pamphlet issued by the Chicago socialist publishing house Charles H. Kerr & Co., For Russia's Freedom.

Fascinated by the tumultuous Russian political situation, Poole successfully convinced The Outlook to send him to Russia as the magazine's correspondent and a contract was drawn up. Poole sailed for England, then proceeded to France before traveling by train to Berlin and on to Russia, bringing with him communications and money entrusted to him in Paris for underground Russian constitutionalists. Together with a translator, Poole traveled Russia extensively in the early days of the 1905 Revolution, ultimately turning in 14 pieces to The Outlook detailing his experiences and observations.

After his return from Russia, Poole continued to produce feature short stories depicting urban working class life for the periodical press, all the while gathering anecdotes for future novels. Poole split his output between The Saturday Evening Post and Everybody's Magazine, as a successful freelance writer.

Poole married the former Margaret Ann Witherbotham in 1907 and the couple established a household in the Greenwich Village section of New York City. The couple would raise three children.

For several years after his marriage, Poole found himself to writing of plays for the stage, an offshoot of the writing profession that pitted low probability of success against potentially immense financial rewards if a piece was successfully staged. His first effort, revolving around life in a steel mill, failed to find a producer but his second, a drama about the construction of a bridge in the Rocky Mountains, led to six weeks of rehearsals and a grand New York opening — followed by poor reviews and a quick close.

Poole would ultimately write 11 plays for the New York stage, two of these in conjunction with Harriet Ford. A total of three of Poole's efforts would be staged, with the two successful dramas running for 6 weeks and 3 months, respectively. His urge to write for the stage whetted, Poole would return to more secure forms of writing.

=== Political activism ===
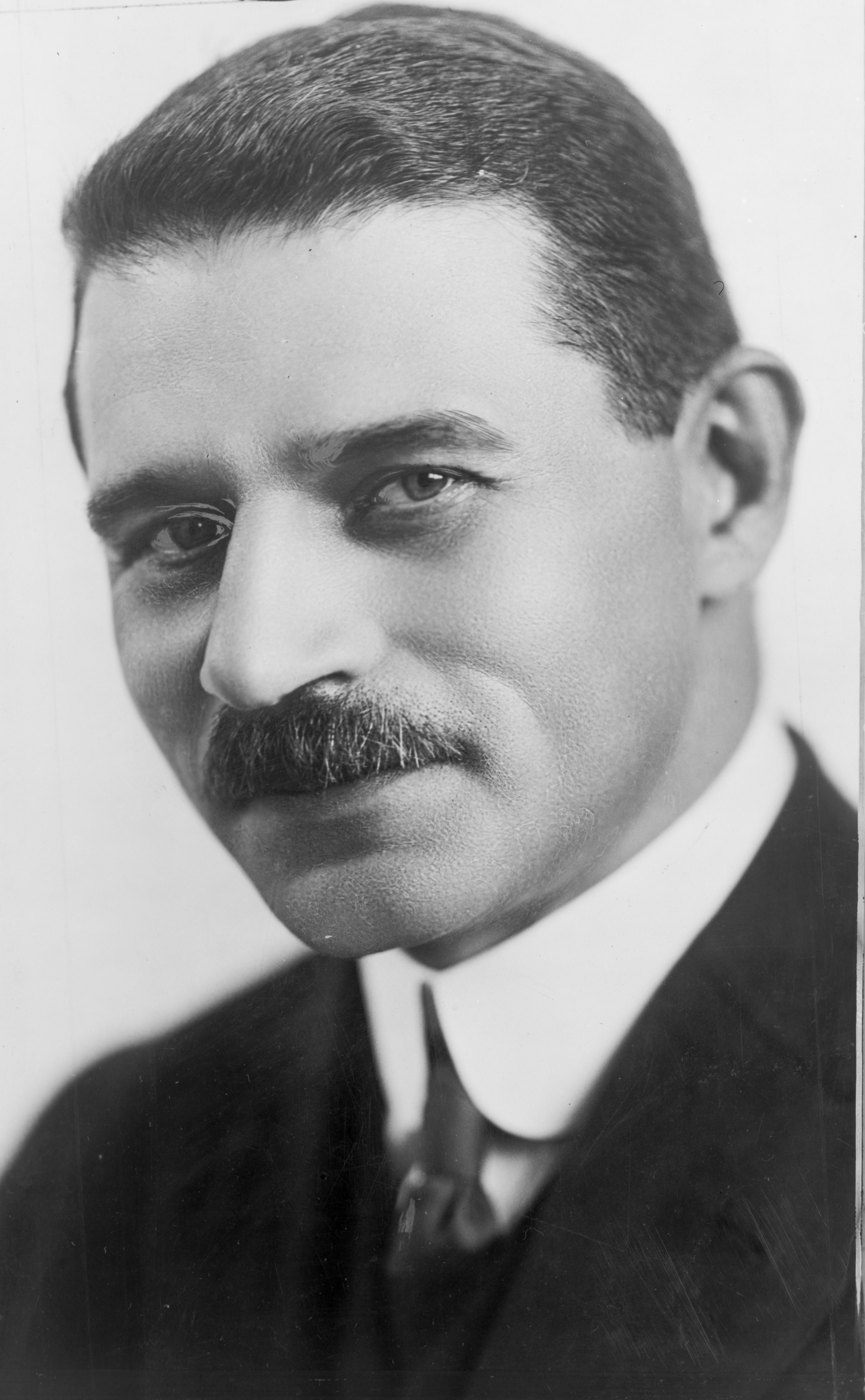
Poole credited erudite lawyer and party leader Morris Hillquit with winning him to membership in the Socialist Party.

Poole was slow to join the growing Socialist Party of America (SPA), initially resisting joining because, as he later recalled, he had "got free from one church and I didn't propose to get into this other and write propaganda all my life, instead of the truth as I saw it and felt it." Around 1908 he made the acquaintance of party leader Morris Hillquit, however, who became a "lovable friend" and persuaded the non-Marxist Poole that his views fell within the "very broad and liberal" ideological umbrella of the Socialist Party. Poole joined a branch of Local New York and maintained his red card in the organization at least through the years of World War I.

From 1908 Poole began writing for the New York Call, a socialist daily closely associated with the Socialist Party of America (SPA). Poole was also among those left wing intellectuals who helped to found the Intercollegiate Socialist Society (ISS), joining in the task with his friends Arthur Bullard and Charles Edward Russell.

=== Novelist ===
Leaving the world of the stage, Poole began to concentrate on full length fiction. In the spring of 1912 he began research on the waterfront environs of Brooklyn Heights, New York, gathering observations and anecdotes that he would painstakingly work into shape for the first of his major novels, The Harbor, which was accepted by Macmillan in the spring of 1914. Physically and emotionally drained by the writing process, Poole spent two months in Europe before returning to the family's new home in the White Mountains of New Hampshire to begin work on his next book.

This idyllic interlude was shattered in the summer of 1914 when World War I erupted across Europe. The world situation so dramatically changed, Poole recovered the manuscript for his book from Macmillans and spent a month writing a completely new ending. Drawn to cover the conflict as a war correspondent as if a moth to a flame, Poole belatedly attempted to make use of his contacts with the publishers of various magazines, but found that all the positions for correspondents in France and England had been filled. He was ultimately able, however, to persuade The Saturday Evening Post to send him to the German capital of Berlin to cover the war from the opposite camp, and early in November 1914 he sailed aboard a British ship for Europe.

In Germany, joining other western war correspondents such as Jack Reed he viewed German hospitals, troop trains, and saw the front from the German side. He would spend three months in Europe covering the conflict.

Finally published in 1915, Poole's The Harbor was well received by critics and the reading public and his place in the American literary scene was thereby firmly established. He followed the book up with a new novel in 1917 dealing with intergenerational conflict, His Family. This book was also warmly regarded, resulting in Poole being awarded the first Pulitzer Prize for Fiction in 1918, an award which at least one 21st Century literary critic has argued was awarded to Poole as much for his previous effort, The Harbor.

Poole's next novel attempted to follow up the successful His Family with a sequel, His Second Wife, published in serial form in McClure's before being released in hard covers later in 1918. This book proved distinctly less successful than his previous literary efforts with critics and the reading public, however, and Poole's fiction never achieved such acclaim again.

From 1920 until 1934, Poole produced works of fiction for Macmillan at the rate of approximately one a year. While none of these attained the critical acclaim of Poole's wartime writings, the 1927 book Silent Storms was met with some degree of public success.

=== Interpreter of the Bolshevik Revolution ===
In 1917 The Saturday Evening Post dispatched Poole to Russia to report on the Russian Revolution, where he joined other sympathetic American commentators such as John "Jack" Reed and Louise Bryant. His journalism on the rapidly changing world in Russia was closely read by a curious public, and the articles subsequently provided the raw material for two works of non-fiction, "The Dark People": Russia's Crisis and The Village: Russian Impressions, both of which were published in book form by Macmillan in 1918.

=== Later years ===
After the war, Poole, Paul Kennaday, and Arthur Livingston initiated an agency, the Foreign Press Service, that negotiated for foreign authors with English-language publishers.

After a six-year hiatus with Macmillan, Poole published his memoirs, The Bridge: My Own Story, in 1940. He returned to writing books during the final decade of his life, publishing one work of non-fiction on famous figures in Chicago history and two lesser novels.

=== Death and legacy ===
Poole died of pneumonia in New York City on Tuesday, January 10, 1950, thirteen days away from his 70th birthday.

== Works ==
=== Books and pamphlets ===
- The Voice of the Street. New York: A.S. Barnes, 1906.
- Katherine Breshkovsky: "For Russia's Freedom." Chicago: Charles H. Kerr & Co., 1906.
- The Harbor. New York: Macmillan, 1915. + Audio version.
- His Family. New York: Macmillan, 1917. + Audio version.
- "The Dark People": Russia's Crisis. New York: Macmillan, 1918.
- The Village: Russian Impressions. New York: Macmillan, 1918.
- His Second Wife. New York: Macmillan, 1918.
- Blind: A Story of These Times. New York: Macmillan, 1920.
- Beggar's Gold. New York: Macmillan, 1921.
- Millions. New York: Macmillan, 1922.
- Danger. New York: Macmillan, 1923.
- The Avalanche. New York: Macmillan, 1924.
- The Little Dark Man and Other Russian Sketches. New York: Macmillan, 1925. —4 short stories.
- The Hunter's Moon. New York: Macmillan, 1925.
- With Eastern Eyes. New York: Macmillan, 1926.
- Silent Storms. New York: Macmillan, 1927.
- Car of Croesus. New York: Macmillan, 1930.
- The Destroyer. New York: Macmillan, 1931.
- Nurses on Horseback. New York: Macmillan, 1932.
- Great Winds. New York: Macmillan, 1933.
- One of Us. New York: Macmillan, 1934.
- The Bridge: My Own Story. New York: Macmillan, 1940. —Memoir.
- Giants Gone: Men Who Made Chicago. New York : Whittlesey House, McGraw-Hill, 1943.
- The Great White Hills of New Hampshire. Garden City, NY: Doubleday, 1946.
- Nancy Flyer: A Stagecoach Epic. New York: Thomas Y. Crowell, 1949.

=== Articles ===
- "Abraham Cahan: Socialist — Journalist — Friend of the Ghetto," The Outlook, Oct. 28, 1911.
- "Our American Merchant Marine under Private Operation," The Saturday Evening Post, vol. 202, no. 8 (Aug. 24, 1929) pp. 25, 142, 145–146, 149–150.
- "Captain Dollar," (serialized in 5 parts) The Saturday Evening Post, May 25-June 22, 1929.
- "Frolicking and Vain Mirth," Woman's Day, April 1948.
