= Eudora Bumstead =

American poet and hymnwriter

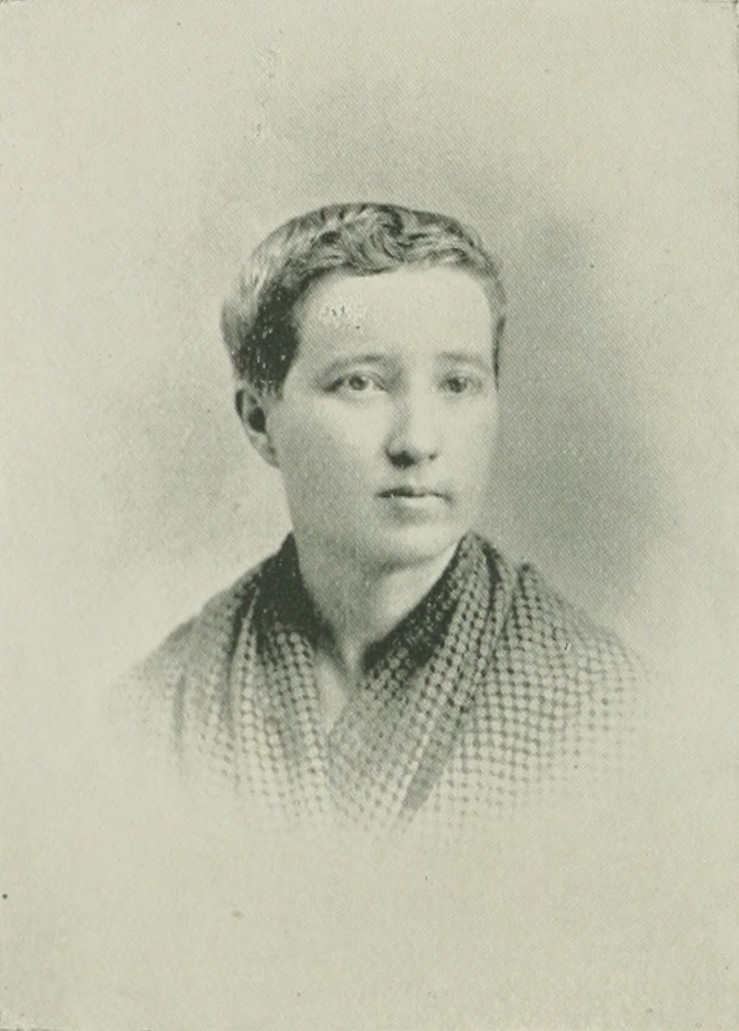
- Photo in A Woman of the Century
- Born: Eudora Stone; August 26, 1860; Bedford, Michigan, U.S.
- Died: 1892 (aged 31–32)
- Resting place: Bellevue Memorial Park, Ontario, California
- Occupations: poet, hymnwriter
- Spouse: William T. Bumstead (m. 1880)
- Children: 2
- Writing career
- Language: English
- Notable work: "Signs of Spring"

Eudora Bumstead (née, Stone; August 26, 1860 – 1892) was a 19th-century American poet and hymnwriter from Michigan. She is remembered as "the children's poet". Bumstead began writing rhymes in childhood, and when ten years old was paid US$2 for a poem entitled, "Signs of Spring", which was published in Our Young Folks, then edited by John Townsend Trowbridge.

== Early life and education ==
Eudora Stone was born in Bedford, Michigan, August 26, 1860. When she was young, her parents removed to Nebraska. Her earliest recollections are of the great West, with its prairie billows crested with pleasant homes, its balmy breezes and its sweeping gales. Her parents were highly cultured, and gave her every possible assistance and encouragement. She began to write rhymes in her childhood, and when ten years old a poem she wrote was published in "Our Young Folks". She received a good public school education. In 1878-79, she was a student at the University of Nebraska.

== Career ==
She was for a time a successful school teacher. While attending the University of Nebraska, she met William T. Bumstead, whom she married in 1880. She has had little time for writing but when she did write, it was mostly for the child-readers of St. Nicholas Magazine and The Youth's Companion, having been a special contributor to the latter for several years, writing as Eudora S. Bumstead.

Bumstead and several other young writers, including, C. A. Stephens, William S. Walsh, Robert M. Walsh, Helen Gray Cone, Eleanor C. Donnelly, Mary Sheldon Barnes, Theodora Robinson Jenness, F. ("Fern") Hamilton, and Edwin Roth Champlin ("Clarence Fairfield"), got their start as writers at Our Young Folks.

== Personal life ==
Bumstead was of Quaker descent, and was said to have quiet tastes, sincere manners, and a small circle of friends. Remarkably well-informed and having an analytic mind, she was a keen, though kindly, disputant, accepting nothing as proved which did not stand the test of reason.

The family lived in Beatrice, Nebraska before removing to Ontario, California with their daughter.

She died in 1892, and was buried at Bellevue Memorial Park, Ontario.

== Style and themes ==
Their only son died at the age of two-and-a-half years, but Bumstead did not write of the sadness occasioned by his loss, believing that it is better to spread light and gladness than clouds and sadness.

== Selected works ==
=== Hymn lyrics ===
- "The sun has gone from the shining skies"
- "Throw to the wind your doubt and fear"

=== Song verses ===
- "Blow, wind, blow", 1888
- "Folliloo"
- "Grievous complaint", 1890
- "In the swing", 1888
- "Kandikew", 1886
- "Little red hen", 1885
- "Mystic sign", 1888
- "Ollie's dreams", 1881
- "Problem in threes", 1889
- "Sad reason for tears", 1889
- "Summer lullaby", 1887
- "Year with dolly", 1892

=== Poems ===
- "Little pine-tree", 1889
- "Quest", 1888
- "A Year with Dolly", 1892

=== Plays ===
- Waiting for Santa Claus, 1889
