= Theodora R. Jenness =

American writer

- Born: Theodora Robinson; 1847; Greenwood, Maine, U.S.
- Died: March 30, 1935 (aged 87–88); Brooklyn, New York, U.S.
- Other name: "Dora"
- Education: Ottawa (Kansas) High School (1865)
- Occupations: lauthor; editor; missionary
- Spouse: George B. Jenness (m. 1872; died 1918)
- Children: 2 daughters
- Writing career
- Language: English
- Genre: children's literature
- Notable works: Piokee; Above the Range

Theodora R. Jenness (née, Robinson; 1847 – March 30, 1935) was an American children's author, editor, and clubwoman who spent many years doing missionary work in South Dakota. In addition to publishing several books between 1879 and 1917, she also contributed short stories and serials to magazines. Jenness died in 1935.

== Early life and education ==
Theodora (nickname, "Dora") Robinson was born in Greenwood, Maine, 1847. Her parents were John and Mary (Stevens) Robinson.

Jenness was educated in public schools. Known as Dora in her school days, she graduated from the high school in Ottawa, Kansas, 1865.

== Career ==
From 1894, Jennness was engaged in mission work for girls of the Cheyenne River Sioux Tribe, in South Dakota. She was teaching at the St. John's Mission, Fort Bennett, South Dakota, in 1901, and in 1908, she was based in Flora, Walworth County, South Dakota.

Along with several other young writers, including, Mary Sheldon Barnes, Eudora Stone Bumstead, Edwin Roth Champlin ("Clarence Fairfield"), Helen Gray Cone, Eleanor C. Donnelly, F. ("Fern") Hamilton, C. A. Stephens, Robert M. Walsh, and William S. Walsh, Janness got her start as a writer at Our Young Folks. Becoming well known as a talented and popular magazine writer, she was especially gifted in her stories and dialogues for children. She contributed to the "Zig Zag series", edited by Hezekiah Butterworth. At one time, she held an editorial position with The Youth's Companion. Readers of The Youth's Companion and other juvenile periodicals often enjoyed her writing. She wrote "Fire Stories", "John Tryman", and made numerous other contributions to leading eastern magazines. For example, in 1893, her serial, "An Educated Indian Story", ran in Wide Awake.

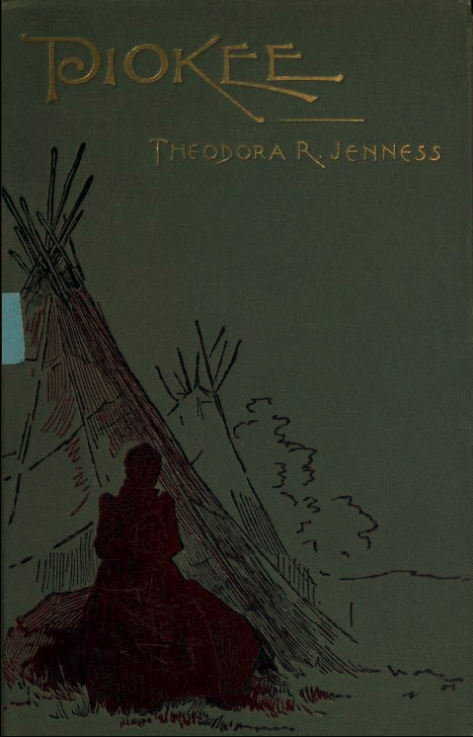
Piokee (1894)

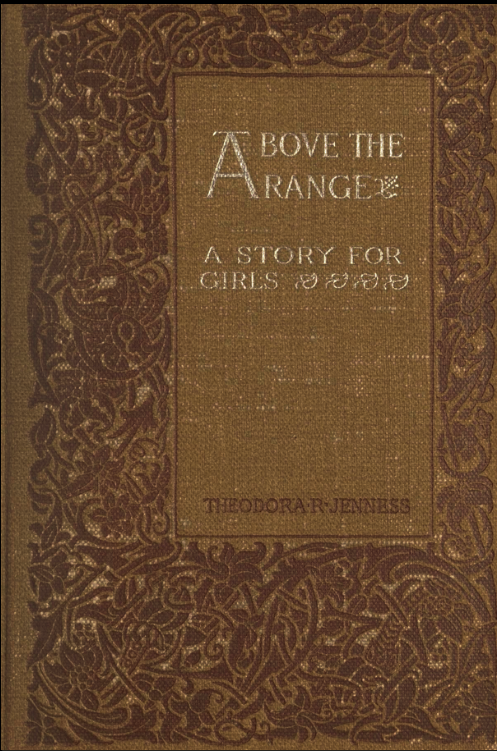
Above the Range (1896)

She was the author of, Two Young Homesteaders, 1881; Piokee and Her People, 1891; Above the Range, 1896, and The Miracle Man, 1917.

== Personal life ==
In 1872, in Ottawa, Kansas, she married Maj. George B. Jenness (died 1918). He was associated with newspaper work in that city. They had two daughters, Ella and Frances.

In 1882, in Ottawa, she organized and co-founded the MPM (Monday afternoon) Club, which became the oldest club of that city.

In 1920, when she was granted a pension of US$25 a month following the death of her husband, Capt. Jenness, in 1918, she was a resident of South Natick, Massachusetts.

Theodora Jenness died in Brooklyn, New York, March 30, 1935. She was survived by her daughter, Frances.

== Selected works ==
=== Books ===
- The Indian Territory, 1879
- The Contributors' club., 1879
- Two Young Homesteaders, 1881
- Piokee and Her People, 1891
- Above the Range, 1896
- A Homely Heroine. A Story of 'an Off Wheat Year'., 1902
- Big and Little Sisters: A Story of an Indian Mission School, 1909
- The Miracle Man, 1917

=== Co-author ===
- Young wives tales from Maine and Kansas
- Young folks' cyclopedia of stories., 1886
