= Takamine Hideo =

Japanese administrator and educator

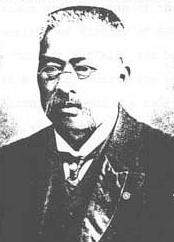
- Born: October 5, 1853; Aizuwakamatsu, Aizu, Japan
- Died: February 22, 1910 (aged 56); Tokyo, Japan
- Education: SUNY Oswego (1878)
- Occupation: Educator
- Spouses: Takamine Sen

Takamine Hideo (高嶺 秀夫; October 5, 1854 – February 22, 1910) was an administrator and educator in Meiji period Japan.

== Early life ==
Takamine was born to a samurai family in Aizuwakamatsu domain (present-day Fukushima Prefecture) in 1854. After completing his studies in the feudal domain's school, Nisshinkan, he became a page to the daimyō Matsudaira Katamori from April 1868 to the surrender of the domain to imperial forces in the Boshin War in November that same year.

He was sentenced to confinement for a time in Tokyo and was placed in the care of the Matsudaira clan of the Tanba-Kameyama Domain. As part of his studies, he entered the private school of Numa Morikazu, where he began to learn English. He soon attended Keiō-gijuku (a private school founded by Fukuzawa Yukichi, which grew into the modern-day Keio University) and received a scholarship to attend Oswego Normal School (now SUNY Oswego) in rural New York in the United States from 1875 to 1878. He was fortunate to attend Oswego during the very height of its fame as a progressive and innovative institution for teacher education. Takamine interacted with Edward Austin Sheldon, the director and founder of the school, and lived in the house of famed educator Johann Heinrich Hermann Krüsi (1817–1903).

During his time in the United States, he also attended Anderson School of Natural History on Penikese Island during the summer of 1877 and spent one semester studying under Burt Wilder, a famous zoologist at Cornell University. He was the first Japanese (some believe to be the first Asian) to have a teaching credential.

== Later career ==
After returning to Japan, Takamine worked as an assistant to American scientist Edward Sylvester Morse and accompanied him on a trek to the rugged areas of Hokkaidō which were occupied by the Ainu.

He eventually became the Vice Principal and Principal of the Tokyo Normal School/Tokyo Higher Normal School (same school but the name was changed), Principal of the Tokyo Art School, and Tokyo Music School. He was also deeply involved in women's education and became the Principal of Tokyo Women's Higher Normal School.

Generally, he is remembered as the man who introduced Pestallozian teaching methods and philosophy to Japan due to his translation of James Johonnot's Principles and Practice of Teaching into Japanese as Kyoiku Shinron [the new theory of education] 1885. Other projects he focused on included Japan's Exhibit in the Columbian Exposition of 1893 and he was involved in the Japan–British Exhibition (1910). His legacy is mixed, as despite his attempts to implement the American model of education in Japan, in the end, the government adopted the more conservative, German model.

Takamine's son, Takamine Toshio (1885–1959), was a famous physicist who worked in the field of spectroscopy.

== Selected works ==
- Takamine Hideo, trans Kyōiku Shinron [The New Theory of Education] 1885
- Takamine Hideo and Iwakawa Tomotarō Dōbutsu Hikaku Kaibozu [Anatomical Charts of Comparative Zoology 4 vol] Tokyo: Fukyusha 1885
- Ministry of Education Beikoku Gakkōhō [the American School Systems] 1878 (In a letter to his mother Takamine mentions that he translated over 200 pages for this manual. His name does not appear in the text).
- Hideo Takamine "Address at Tokyo Normal School", Tokyo Meikeikai Zasshi No. 14 (March 1884) pp. 9–21 recorded by Torasaburo Wakabayashi faithful student and colleague

== Honors ==
- Order of the Rising Sun
