= Zabdiel (given name) =

- Gender: Male

Origin
- Origin: Hebrew
- Meaning: "gift of God"
- Region of origin: Israel

Zabdiel is a male given name of Hebrew origin (זבדיאל), meaning "gift of God".

Notable people with this name include:

- Zabdiel Adams (1739–1801), American theologian
- Zabdiel Boylston Adams (1829–1902), American surgeon
- Zabdiel Boylston (1679–1766), American physician
- Zabdiel de Jesus (born 1997), American singer
- Zabdiel Judah (born 1977), American former boxer
- Zabdiel Sampson (1781–1828), American politician
