= Holly Tree =

Holly Tree may refer to:

- the plant Holly
- the restaurant chain Holly Tree Inn
