= Edward Sheldon (disambiguation) =

Edward Sheldon may refer to:

- Edward Sheldon (1886–1946), American dramatist
- Edward Austin Sheldon (1823–1897), American educator, founding president of State University of New York at Oswego
- Edward Sheldon (politician) (1782–1836), English Member of Parliament
- Edward Sheldon (translator) (1599–1687), English translator of four Catholic works
