= Mary Sheldon =

Mary Sheldon could refer to:

- May French Sheldon (Mary French Sheldon, 1847–1936), American author and explorer
- Mary Sheldon Barnes (born Mary Downing Sheldon, 1850–1898), American educator and historian
- Mary Seney Sheldon (1863–1913), president of the New York Philharmonic

== See also ==
- Mary Shelton (c.1510/15– c.1570/71), contributor to the Devonshire manuscript
- Rose Mary Sheldon (born 1948), American historian
