= Mary Abigail Dodge =

American writer and essayist

- Mary Abigail Dodge
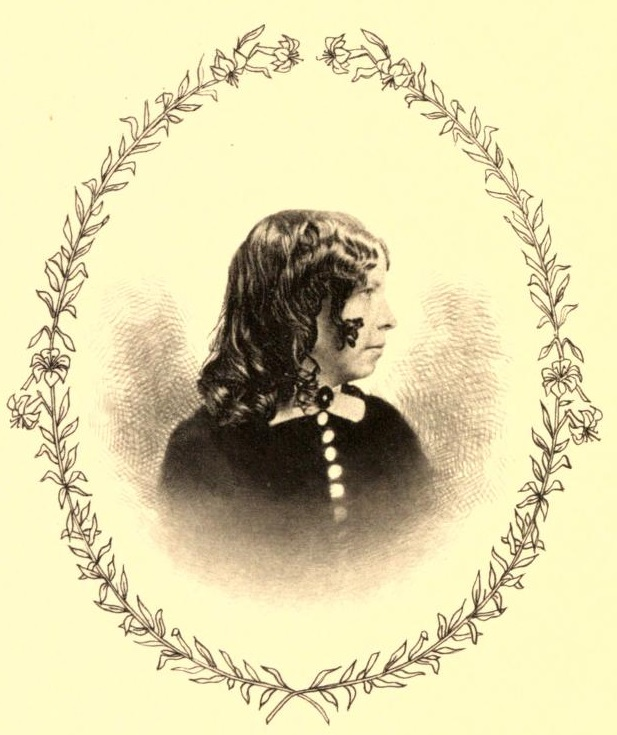
- Мэри Эбигейл Додж
- Born: March 31, 1833; Hamilton
- Died: August 17, 1896
- Occupations: Essayist, journalist, writer, opinion writer, suffragette, feminist

Mary Abigail Dodge (March 31, 1833 – August 17, 1896) was an American writer and essayist, who wrote under the pseudonym Gail Hamilton. Her writing is noted for its wit and promotion of equality of education and occupation for women. She was an abolitionist.

== Biography ==
Mary Abigail Dodge was born March 31, 1833, in Hamilton, Massachusetts. She was born on a farm, the seventh child of Hannah and James Dodge. A childhood accident left her blind in one eye. At 12, she was sent to a boarding school in Cambridge, Massachusetts, before enrolling at the Ipswich Female Seminary. She graduated in 1850, and proceeded to teach there for four years, until she got a position at Hartford Female Seminary. She disliked the job, however, and decided to write poetry.

Editor Gamaliel Bailey read her work in 1856 and, by 1858, she had moved to Washington, D.C. to serve as a governess for his children. From there, she sent in her publications to anti-slavery newspapers. She disliked attention, however, and chose the pen name Gail Hamilton, combining the last part of her middle name with her place of birth. Among her writings were political commentaries, making her one of the first female political correspondents in Washington. Her essays were best known for their harshness towards men.

In 1860, after Bailey's death, Dodge returned to her native town and contributed to The Atlantic Monthly. Her father died in 1864 and she helped support her mother until she died in 1868. By 1871, she returned to Washington to live with the family of James G. Blaine, who was married to her first cousin, but returned to Hamilton in summers.

Dodge became known for her personality as much as her writing. When asked for a description for a compilation about eminent women of the day, she responded with a variation of Edgar Allan Poe's poem "The Bells" that she was "Neither man nor woman / I am neither brute nor human / I am a ghoul!" One of her admirers later wrote, "She is incisive, even combative, by nature, and thoroughly enjoys a good, hot old-fashioned controversies." From its inception in 1865 to 1867, Dodge was a regular contributor to Our Young Folks, a children's magazine.

Dodge was also interested in publishing matters and criticized the assumption that women writers were "an eternal child" when it came to understanding the business side of authorship. In 1868, after reading an article in The Congregationalist titled "Pay of Authors", she realized her royalty payment of 15 cents per book sold was less than the average author pay of 10%. She wrote to her publisher James T. Fields, who initially ignored her, and eventually claimed that he spent more money on publishing and advertising her books than average. She learned, too, that Sophia Hawthorne, widow of the author Nathaniel Hawthorne, was also having similar trouble with Field's publishing house Ticknor and Fields. She abruptly ended her friendship with Fields' wife Annie Adams Fields in February 1868, and Mrs. Fields eventually destroyed all the letters from her former friend. In her journal a month later, she wrote of her distress, "We do not forget to feel still the savagery... of Gail Hamilton... I really thought she cared for me! And now to find it was a pretense or a stepping-stone merely is something to shudder over. And all for a little of this world's poor money!" After months of back and forth, during which Dodge came to distrust Ticknor and Fields and wrote to other authors including Henry Wadsworth Longfellow and Harriet Beecher Stowe to discredit them, she anonymously published A Battle of the Books in 1870 chronicling her negative experiences.

While working on a biography of James Blaine, she had a stroke, leaving her in a coma that lasted for several weeks. Her strength recovered, aided by her sister Hannah, and she was able to enjoy company with friends and relatives. During these months, she wrote her final work, "X-Rays", which was intentionally self-published, and dedicated to her sister. She died of a cerebral hemorrhage on August 17, 1896.

== Publications ==
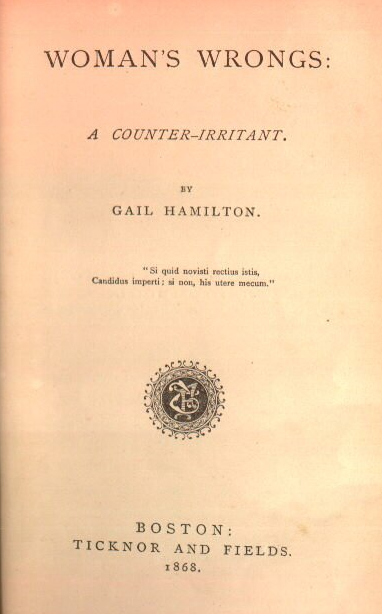
Woman's Wrongs: A Counter-irritant (1868)

- Country Living and Country Thinking (1863)
- Gala-Days (1863)
- Stumbling-Blocks (1864)
- A New Atmosphere (1865)
- Skirmishes and Sketches (1865)
- Summer Rest (1866)
- Red-Letter Days in Applethorpe (1866)
- Wool-Gathering (1867)
- Woman's Wrongs: A Counter-Irritant (1868)
- A Battle of the Books (1870)
- Woman's Worth and Worthlessness (1872)
- Little Folk Life (1872)
- Child World (1873)
- Twelve Miles from a Lemon (1874)
- Nursery Noonings (1875)
- Sermons to the Clergy (1876)
- What Think Ye of Christ? (1877)
- First Love is Best: A Sentimental Sketch (1877)
- Our Common School System (1880)
- Divine Guidance: Memorial of Allen W. Dodge (1881)
- The Insuppressible Book (1885)
- A Washington Bible-Class (1891)
- English Kings in a Nutshell (1893)
- Biography of James G. Blaine (1895)
- X Rays (1896)

Posthumously compiled:

- Gail Hamilton's Life In Letters (2 volumes.,1901)
- Chips, Fragments, and Vestiges (1902)
