= Robert O'Connor (author) =

American novelist

- Born: 1959 (age 66–67); United States
- Occupations: Novelist, screenwriter
- Writing career
- Genre: Fiction

Robert O'Connor (born 1959) is an American novelist and professor. His satiric novel Buffalo Soldiers was adapted into the 2001 movie of the same name.

== Personal life ==
O'Connor received a B.A. in English/Writing Arts from the State University of New York at Oswego, and an M.A. in English from Syracuse University. As of 2005, he teaches Intermediate Fiction, Advanced Fiction and Intermediate Screenwriting at SUNY Oswego.

== Literary career ==
He is the author of a novel, 1993's Buffalo Soldiers, which was adapted into the film of the same name. The literary magazine Granta called him one of the most promising young novelists, and novelist James Carroll, in a positive review in The New York Times, called him a "fine novelist." In the United Kingdom, Buffalo Soldiers was highly praised by the reviewer of The Independent, who called it "powerful" and said that the novel's denouement was "delicate, unflinching and deeply moving." Other reviewers praised his portrayal of American military life in Germany, including its "race hatred and race-related violence."

The movie version of the book, which was initially produced for a 2001 release, was delayed until 2003 given the unfavorable portrayal of the United States Army, which was particularly salient after the September 11 attacks.
