= State University of New York at Oswego =

Public college in Oswego, New York, US

Coordinates: 43.451361°N 76.544044°W

- Former names: Oswego Primary Teachers Training School (1861–1942); Oswego State Teachers College (1942–1948); State University of New York College at Oswego (1948–2023)
- Motto: To Learn, To Search, To Serve
- Type: Public university
- Established: 1861; 165 years ago
- Parent institution: State University of New York
- Affiliations: SUNY
- Endowment: $80.9 million (2025)
- President: Peter O. Nwosu
- Students: 6,483 (fall 2025)
- Undergraduates: 5,293 (fall 2025)
- Postgraduates: 1,190 (fall 2025)
- Location: Oswego, New York, U.S.
- Campus: 700 acres (280 ha); Rural
- Colors: Hunter green and gold
- Nickname: Lakers
- Sporting affiliations: NCAA Division III – SUNYAC
- Website: oswego.edu

State University of New York at Oswego (SUNY Oswego or Oswego State) is a public university in Oswego, New York, United States. It has a total student population of 6,756 and the campus size is 700 acres (280 ha). SUNY Oswego offers more than 120 undergraduate, graduate and professional programs in four colleges: College of Business and Entrepreneurship, College of Communication, Media, and the Arts, College of Education, Health, and Human Services, and the College of Liberal Arts, Sciences, and Engineering.

== History ==
SUNY Oswego was founded in 1861 as the "Oswego Primary Teachers Training School" by Edward Austin Sheldon, who introduced a revolutionary teaching methodology Oswego Movement in American education. In 1942 the New York Legislature elevated it from a normal school to a degree-granting teachers' college, Oswego State Teachers College, which was a founding and charter member of the State University of New York system in 1948. In 1962 the college broadened its scope to become a liberal arts college.

== Campus ==
Most of the campus is in the Town of Oswego, including the census-designated place. Portions of the campus are in Oswego City.

Founded in the city of Oswego, the university was created to train teachers to meet pressing educational needs. SUNY Oswego moved to its current location on the shore of Lake Ontario in 1913 after Sheldon Hall was constructed. The current campus is located on 690 acres (2.8 km^{2}) along Lake Ontario. Development of the campus was planned by the architectural firm of Skidmore, Owings & Merrill, who designed the major buildings.

The campus today consists of 46 buildings with classrooms, laboratories, residential and athletic facilities. Recent years have witnessed the launch of a $700 million campus-wide renovation and renewal program, with the new Campus Center acting as the social hub of campus.

The university's social hub, known as the Marano Campus Center Complex, opened in the fall of 2007, and includes new construction and renovation of the existing Swetman/Poucher complex. The $25.5 million 111,492-square-foot (10,357.9 m^{2}) Marano Campus Center portion, the new construction, includes the Deborah. F. Stanley Arena and Convocation Hall and several academic departments.

=== Tyler Art Gallery ===
The Tyler Art Gallery is located within Tyler Hall. The gallery showcases local and traveling exhibitions, exhibitions of faculty work and student exhibitions. Students curate and have sole responsibility for the annual exhibition of student work. The gallery's permanent collection comprises European, African, and American drawings, prints, paintings, ceramics and sculpture that date from the 18th century to the present, including several works by artist Sacha Kolin. One subsection of the permanent collection, the Grant Arnold Collection of Fine Prints, contains over 500 prints by American printmakers from the first half of the twentieth century. Tyler Hall is in the process of significant renovations, with the first phase completed for a fall 2016 reopening.

=== Other buildings ===
Physically separate from the main campus, on the other side of New York State Route 104, is the south campus, consisting of Laker Hall (indoor sports, coaching classrooms, and athletic training rooms), Romney Fieldhouse (a Quonset hut that hosted the Laker hockey program until fall 2006) and several athletic fields. In addition, more than 400 acres (1.6 km^{2}) of Rice Creek Field Station (for biological research and public programs) are on the South Campus.

West Campus, along with Laker Hall, Hewitt Hall (which hosted most of the student organizations until the Campus Center's opening in 2006), Tyler Hall, Culkin Hall (the administrative building), Penfield Library, Lanigan Hall (consisting of large lecture halls) and Mahar Hall are all built in the Brutalist style and date to the early 1970s.

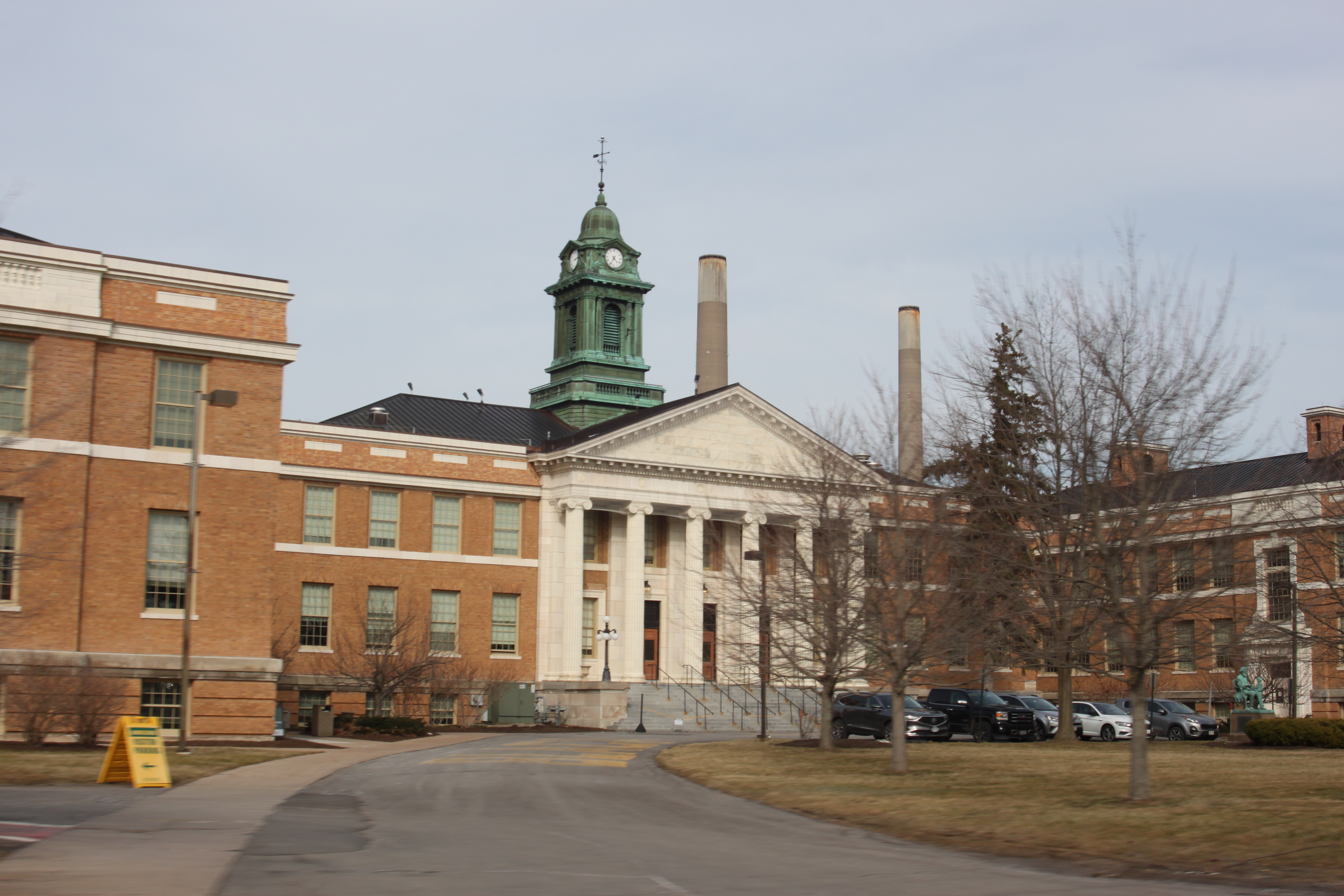
Sheldon Hall was constructed in 1913

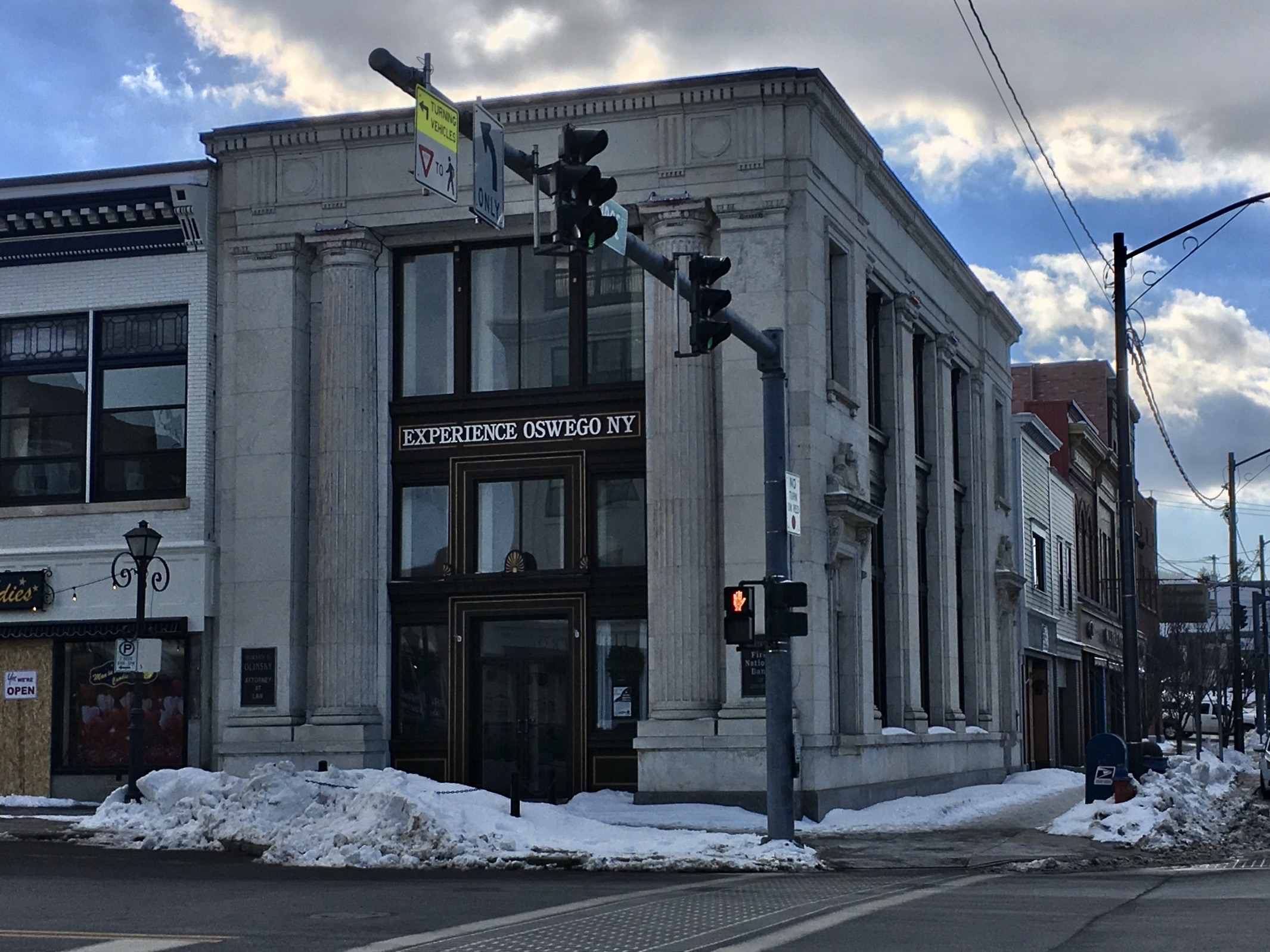
Building at Bridge Street

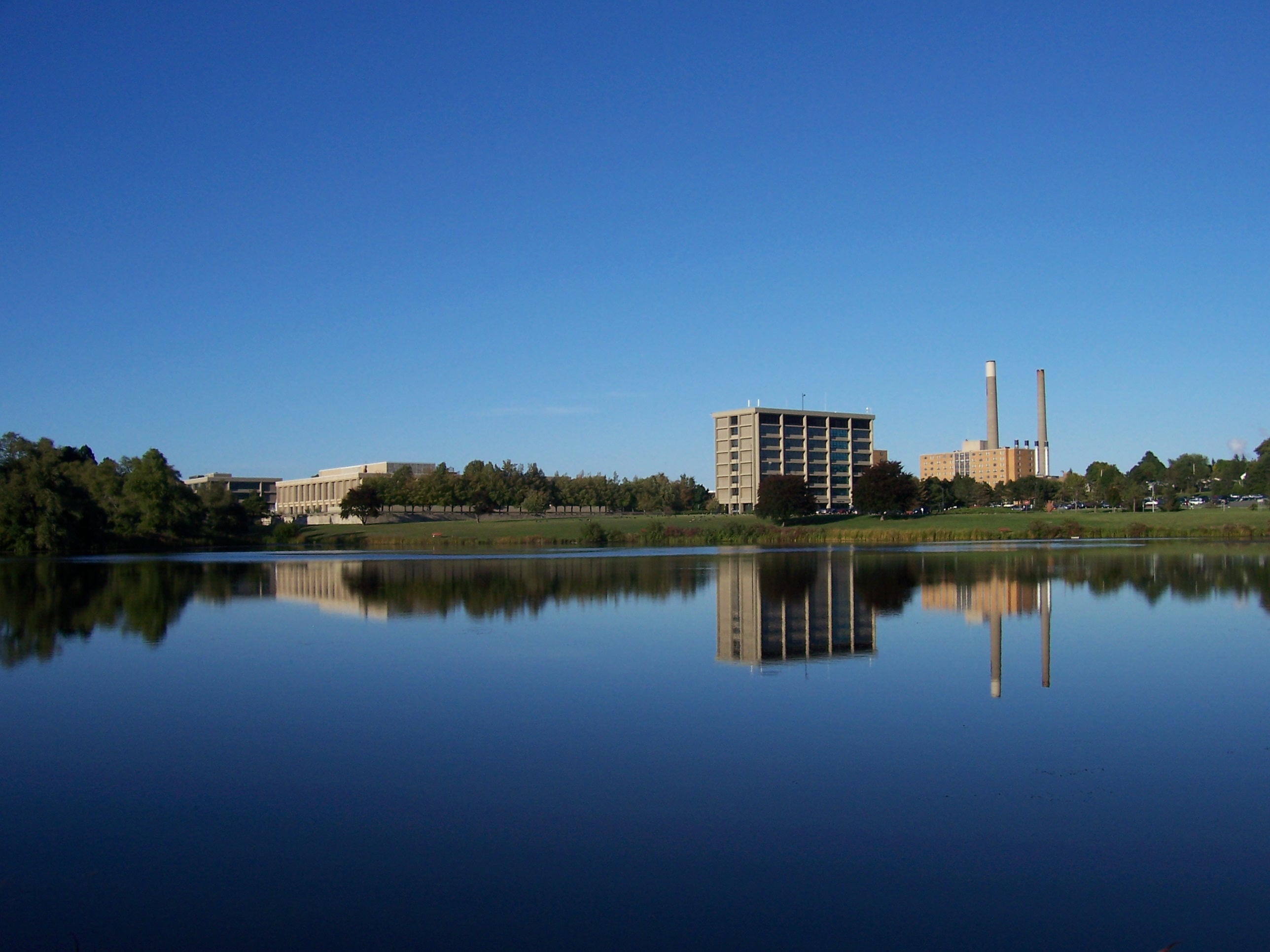
Campus as viewed from Glimmerglass Lagoon

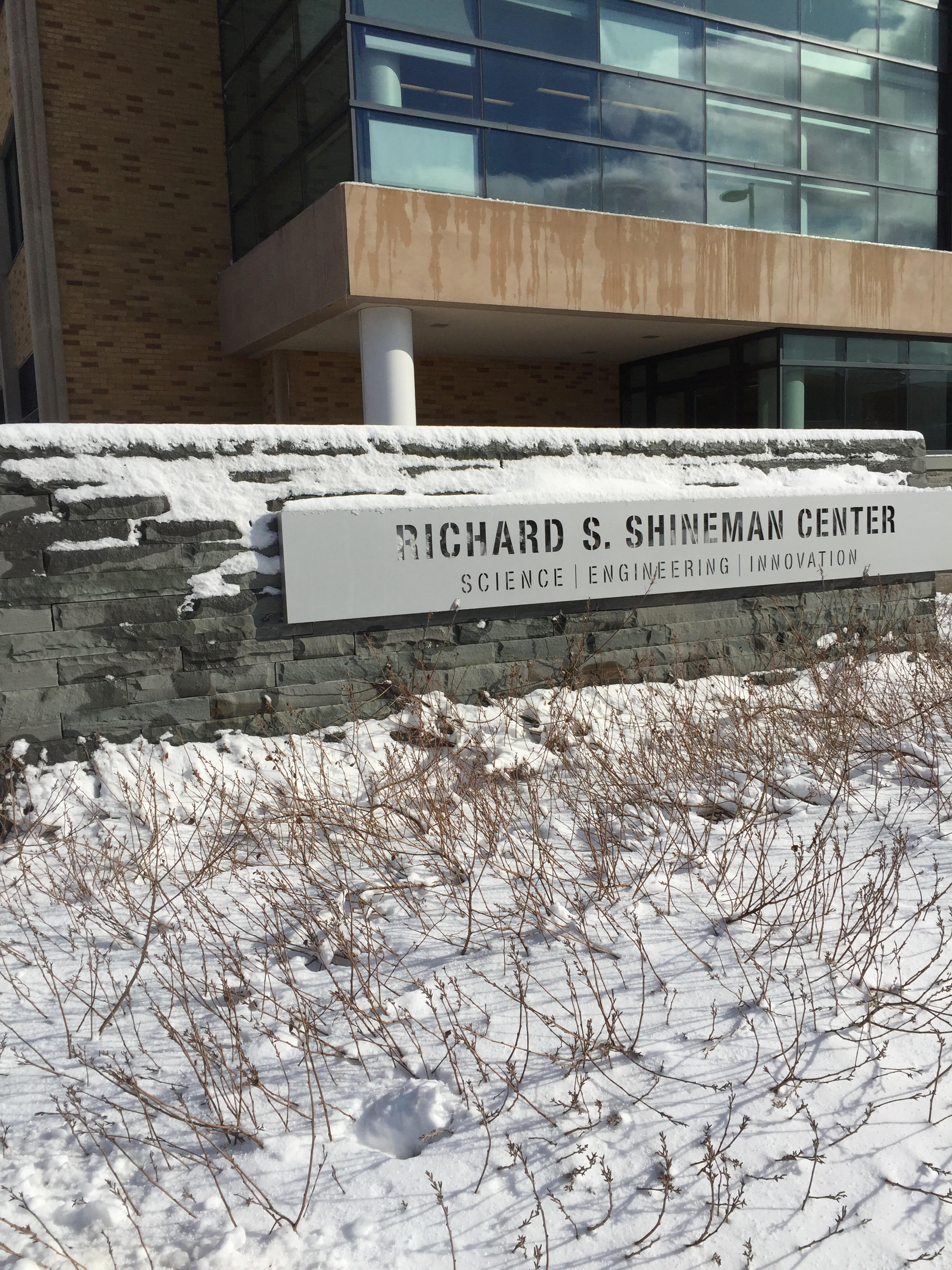
Shineman Center

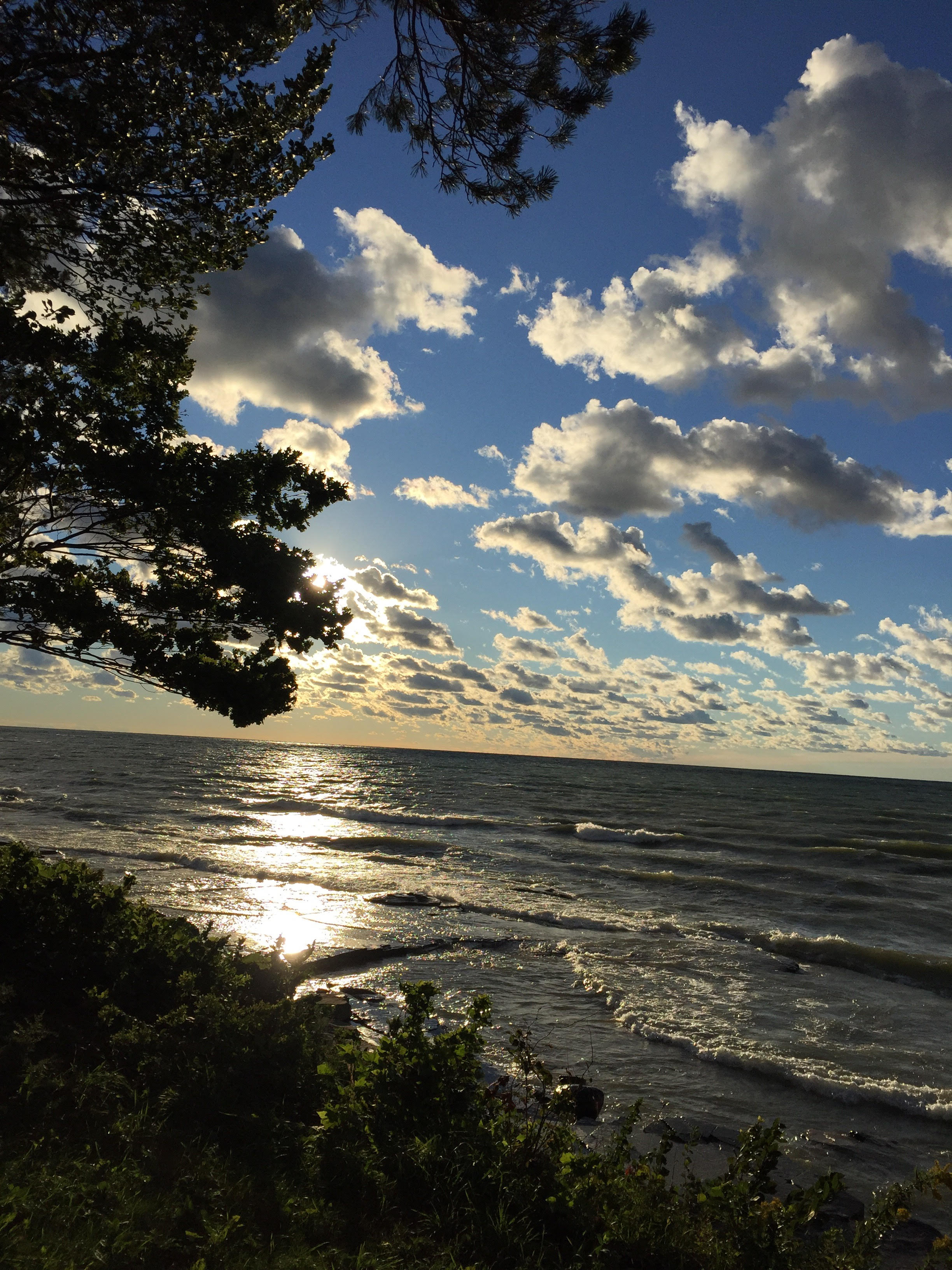
Approaching sunset over Lake Ontario

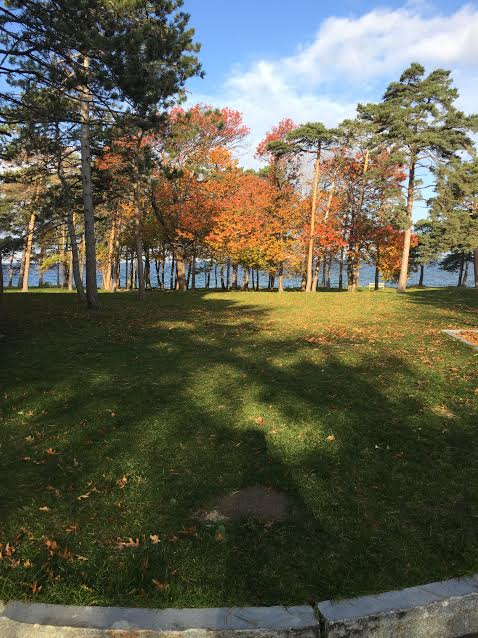
The SUNY Oswego campus

== Accreditations ==
Middle States accredited with additional accreditations. The institution's MBA program has been internationally accredited by AACSB. SUNY Oswego's School of Education is accredited by the Council for the Accreditation of Educator Preparation. Oswego's College of Business and Entrepreneurship has international accreditation by the Association to Advance Collegiate Schools of Business. SUNY Oswego programs in Electrical and Computing Engineering as well as Software Engineering are accredited by ABET. SUNY Oswego is one of the few universities in New York state whose art, music, and theater departments are all nationally accredited.

== Schools and colleges ==
- College of Liberal Arts and Sciences houses the departments of Anthropology, Atmospheric and Geological Sciences, Biology, Chemistry, Computer Science, Economics, Electrical and Computer Engineering, English and Creative Writing, History, Human Development, Mathematics, Modern Languages and Literatures, Philosophy, Physics, Political Science, Psychology, Criminal Justice, Sociology
- College of Business and Entrepreneurship offers programs in Accounting, Business Administration, Finance, Human Resource Management, Marketing, Operations Management and Information Systems, Risk Management and Insurance.
- School of Communication, Media and the Arts houses the departments of Art, Communication Studies, Film Studies, Music, Theatre.
- School of Education offers courses in Counseling and Psychological Services, Curriculum and Instruction, Education Administration, Health Promotion and Wellness, Technology, Vocational Teacher Preparation.

== Library ==
Penfield Library is the only academic library on campus. It is named after Lida S. Penfield, once chair of the English department. The current 160,000-square-foot (15,000 m^{2}) facility opened in 1968, replacing a library of the same name in what is now Rich Hall. The library is home to the Millard Fillmore and Marshall Family Papers and numerous digitized collections including the Fort Ontario Emergency Refugee Shelter (Safe Haven) papers.

== Athletics ==
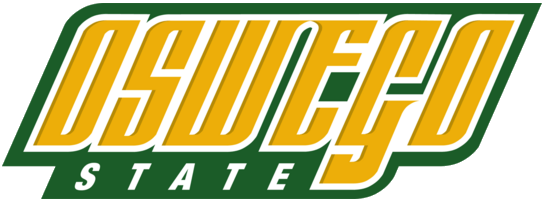
Oswego athletics wordmark

Men's sports	Women's sports
Baseball	Basketball
Basketball	Cross country
Cross country	Field hockey
Golf	Ice hockey
Ice hockey	Lacrosse
Lacrosse	Soccer
Soccer	Softball
Swimming	Swimming
Tennis	Tennis
Track and field	Track and field
Wrestling	Volleyball

The university offers 14 intercollegiate varsity sports. SUNY Oswego's athletic teams are known officially as the Great Lakers but often referred to simply as the Lakers. Oswego is a member of NCAA Division III and teams compete in the State University of New York Athletic Conference for most sports.

Oswego is traditionally a rival of Plattsburgh State. The rivalry currently manifests mostly in ice hockey; in the 1990s and early 2000s, Oswego fans would regularly throw bagels onto the ice when the Lakers scored against Plattsburgh, responding to a tradition where Plattsburgh fans threw tennis balls on the rink after goals versus Oswego. The tradition ended in 2006, after Oswego was assessed a delay of game penalty for the bagel throw: Plattsburgh scored on the ensuing power-play to win the game, which cost the Lakers a national tournament berth. In addition, the Campus Center arena was opened that year which allowed the university to more closely monitor and shut down fans who brought in bagels.

The "Puck Flattsburgh" spoonerism is a common rallying cry. Oswego and Plattsburgh also had a rivalry in football, but Oswego ceased sponsoring the sport in 1976, with Plattsburgh following in 1978.

=== National championships ===
The Oswego State men's ice hockey team won the 2007 NCAA Division III ice hockey tournament, the first NCAA championship ever for the school.

== Clubs and student organizations ==
Oswego has over 180 clubs and organizations. These include the Division I Men's Rugby team, the student-run television station WTOP, the student-run newspaper The Oswegonian, the first-ever student-run volunteer ambulance corps (SAVAC), and the Oswego State Esports Association.

=== Greek organizations ===
As of May 2026, Oswego has 16 recognized Greek organizations (4 fraternities, 10 sororities, and 2 mixed) from both national and locally recognized chapters.

== Traditions ==
- Bridge Street Run – The Bridge Street Run is a pub crawl that now takes place during the spring semester on the last Friday before finals week. Students put on white T-shirts, start at the Front Door Tavern on East 10th and Utica Streets, and make their way down Bridge Street (New York State Route 104) in Oswego. They stop at all participating bars along the way on or within a block of Bridge Street to have their shirts signed. The event has been a tradition in various forms at SUNY Oswego for over 30 years. The college officially discourages the practice. It was finally banned by the city in 2014 following a students death caused by a heroin overdose on campus; the following year, the college set up OzFest, a campus festival, to deter partiers from participating in the Bridge Street Run. However, students still continue the tradition each spring.

== Presidents ==
- Edward Austin Sheldon (1st), 1861–1897
- Isaac B. Poucher (2nd), 1897–1913
- James C. Riggs (3rd), 1913–1933
- Ralph Waldo Swetman (4th), 1933–1947
- Harvey M. Rice (5th), 1947–1952
- Foster S. Brown (6th), 1952–1963
- James E. Perdue (7th), 1965–1977
- Virginia Radley (8th), 1977–1988
- Stephen L. Weber (9th), 1988–1995
- Deborah F. Stanley (10th) 1995–2021
- Mary C. Toale, Officer in Charge (interim), 2022–2023
- Peter O. Nwosu (11th), 2023–present

== Notable staff and faculty ==
- George H. Estabrooks, author, psycholigist
- Soma Mei Sheng Frazier, author, editor
- Kenneth O. Hall, Governor-General of Jamaica (Feb 2006 – Feb 2009); served as Assistant Provost and Professor of History at Oswego
- Doug Lea, computer scientist
- Roy Lichtenstein, pop artist; taught in the Art Department 1958–1960
- Robert O'Connor, Associate Professor in Creative Writing Department; author of Buffalo Soldiers
- Leigh Allison Wilson, author and creative writing professor

== Notable alumni ==
Name	Class year	Notability	References
Luke Manley	2015	Internet personality and actor	
Rob Cesternino	2000	Contestant on Survivor: The Amazon and host of Rob Has a Podcast	
Kendis Gibson	1994	Anchor	
Sal Iacono	1993	Writer, TV personality	
Christopher Maloney	1991	Bass guitarist for Dweezil Zappa, Hardline; Sunset Records recording artist	
Julia DeVillers	1989	Author of books for children and teens	
Steve Levy	1987	ESPN sportscaster	
Yvonne M. Spicer	1984	First mayor of Framingham, Massachusetts and first African-American woman to be popularly elected mayor in Massachusetts	
Scott Sullivan	1983	Former WorldCom CFO	
Robert O'Connor	1982	Author of Buffalo Soldiers	
Linda Cohn	1981	ESPN sportscaster	
Robert Natoli	1980	Guinness record holder	
Robin Curtis	1978	Actress most well known as Lt. Saavik in Star Trek III and Star Trek IV	
Al Roker	1976	Weatherman for NBC's Today Show	
Alice McDermott	1975	Novelist and winner of the 1998 National Book Award	
John McLoughlin	1975	One of two Port Authority of New York and New Jersey police officers who survived after being trapped in the September 11 attacks on the World Trade Center	
Wayne Levi	1974	Professional golfer	
Heraldo Muñoz	1972	Former ambassador to the United Nations for Chile; former Chilean foreign minister	
Pete Sears	1971	Member of the 1972 United States Olympic hockey team (goalie)	
James W. Wright	1971	Former New York State Senator	
Ken Auletta	1963	Journalist for The New Yorker	
Charles E. King	1891	Composer of the "Hawaiian Wedding Song"; educator, legislator	
Hideo Takamine	1877	Educator in Meiji period Japan	
Woodbridge N. Ferris	1873	Governor of Michigan; U.S. Senator; founder of Ferris State University	
Moses Sherman	1873	Real estate developer and railway entrepreneur. The Sherman Oaks neighborhood in Los Angeles is named for him.	
Frederick R. Bieber	1972	Harvard University professor and DNA expert	
Marianne M. Myles		U.S. Ambassador to the nation of Cape Verde	
Jerry Seinfeld	Never Graduated	Comedian	
Sanford Miller	1975	Former CEO of Budget Rent A Car and current CEO of Carey International.	

- Actor Al Lewis claimed that he attended the school from 1927 to 1931. Most of Lewis's claims about his early life are widely considered to be untrue.

== Campus demographics ==
Undergraduate demographics as of Fall 2023
Race and ethnicity	Total
White	65%
Hispanic	14%
Black	11%
Two or more races	4%
Asian	3%
International student	3%
Economic diversity
Low-income (Note: The percentage of students who received an income-based federal Pell grant intended for low-income students.)	39%
Affluent (Note: The percentage of students who are a part of the American middle class at the bare minimum.)	61%

Historical population
Census	Pop.	Note	%±
2010	3,676		—
2020	3,451		−6.1%
U.S. Decennial Census; 2010 2020

SUNY Oswego CDP is a census-designated place (CDP) covering much of the campus.

The CDP is within the Oswego City School District.

SUNY Oswego CDP, New York – Demographic Profile(NH = Non-Hispanic)
Race / Ethnicity	Pop 2010	Pop 2020	% 2010	% 2020
White alone (NH)	3,038	2,239	82.64%	64.88%
Black or African American alone (NH)	192	431	5.22%	12.49%
Native American or Alaska Native alone (NH)	8	23	0.22%	0.67%
Asian alone (NH)	119	176	3.24%	5.10%
Pacific Islander alone (NH)	3	0	0.08%	0.00%
Some Other Race alone (NH)	9	1	0.24%	0.03%
Mixed Race/Multi-Racial (NH)	62	119	1.69%	3.45%
Hispanic or Latino (any race)	245	462	6.66%	13.39%
Total	3,676	3,451	100.00%	100.00%

Note: the US Census treats Hispanic/Latino as an ethnic category. This table excludes Latinos from the racial categories and assigns them to a separate category. Hispanics/Latinos can be of any race.
