= Frances Matilda Abbott =

American suffragist and naturalist

Frances Matilda Abbot
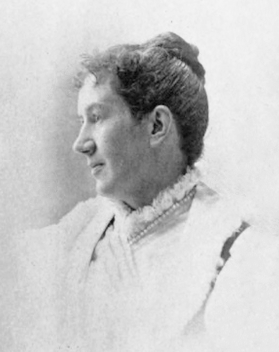
- Frances Matilda Abbot, before 1896
- Born: August 18, 1857; Concord, New Hampshire, US
- Died: September 23, 1939 (aged 82); Concord, New Hampshire, US
- Education: Vassar College
- Occupations: suffragist, naturalist
- Known for: The first woman from Concord, New Hampshire to earn a bachelor's degree

Frances Matilda Abbott (August 18, 1857 – September 21, 1939) was an American suffragist and naturalist. The first woman from Concord, New Hampshire, to earn a bachelor's degree, Abbott often wrote on suffrage for national newspapers and participated in many suffragist organizations. She also authored texts on Concord wildlife and genealogy for local audiences, leading to her inclusion on several contemporary lists of notable American women.

== Early life ==
On August 18, 1857, Frances Matilda Abbott was born in Concord, New Hampshire, the only child of John and Matilda (Brooks) Abbott. Her father, who was elected the Mayor of Concord six times, was descended from early settlers of Concord, and her mother had once studied at the transcendentalist utopian Brook Farm community.

At the age of fourteen, Abbot became a paid contributor to the monthly newspaper Our Young Folks. She graduated from Concord High School in 1875 and graduated from Vassar College in 1881, making her the first woman from Concord to earn a bachelor's degree.

== Suffragist work ==
Abbott was a longtime supporter of women's suffrage. Starting in the 1890s, she frequently wrote columns advocating for women's suffrage om nationally recognized periodicals including The Century Magazine, North American Review, Popular Science Monthly, and Frank Leslie's.

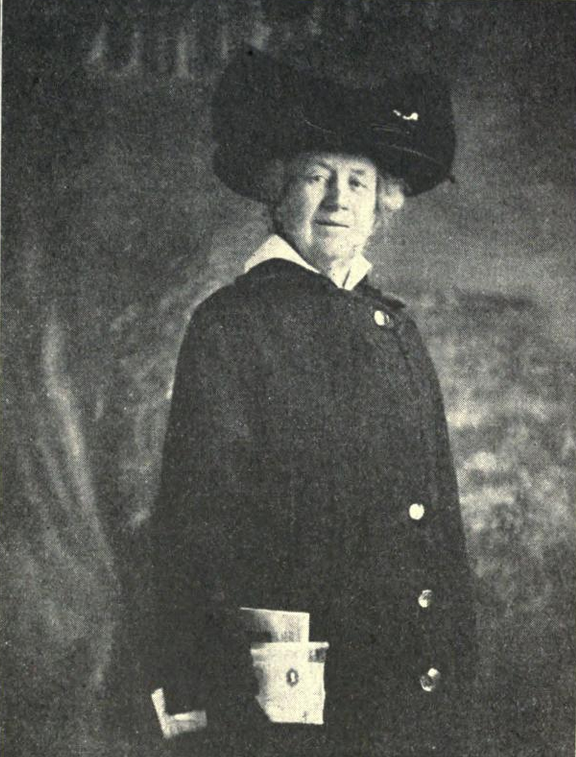
From a 1919 publication.

Abbot also discussed the liberating effect of college education on women. Using her membership to the Association of Collegiate Alumnae (a network for educated women and the predecessor to the modern American Association of University Women), Abbott analyzed their member register alongside Vassar alumnae records to track college-graduated women's post-college accomplishments and wage earnings. By calculating the frequency of career outcomes and marriages amongst college-educated women, Abbott commented on contemporary concerns that college would cause women's marriage rates to drop. Though she worried about declining marriage rates among young women, she noted the importance of college education for women, writing that "Woman, having once tasted of the fruit of the tree of knowledge, will not be content to renounce it." Modern scholars note that her articles helped contextualize women's rights in a time when suffrage was still regarded with suspicion.

Abbot edited the first Woman's Edition of the Concord Monitor in 1896 and spearheaded a 1910 campaign to reduce working women's hours by closing Concord stores early on Mondays. A member of several local suffrage organizations, Abbott served as the New Hampshire Suffrage Association's press agent from 1913 to 1915 and led Suffrage Headquarters in Concord from 1914 to 1915. Abbott also held life memberships in the Concord Female Charitable Society, the Woman's Auxiliary to YMCA, and the Woman's Hospitality Association.

== Local writings ==
Abbott was also an avid naturalist. After an 1885 nature trip with the Appalachian Mountain Club, she was inspired to found a Concord nature appreciation organization, the Wild Flower Club, in 1896. Ten years later, she published a guide to Concord's flora and fauna based on her personal observations called Birds and Flowers about Concord, New Hampshire. Her book sought to make local wildlife accessible to other Concord residents, especially children, through a series of diary narratives describing her encounters with local species. By including other nature watchers' observations, Abbott's book catalogued 201 distinct birds and 540 flowers in Concord.

Abbott also took on genealogical and historical projects. She co-authored texts on Concord and New Hampshire history and edited numerous local memoirs and biographies. For her prolific writing nationally and locally, she was included in several contemporary lists of notable American women and New Hampshire residents.

== Later life ==
A lifelong Concord resident, Abbott died in Concord on September 21, 1939, at the age of 82.
