= Annie Adams Fields =

American writer (1834–1915)

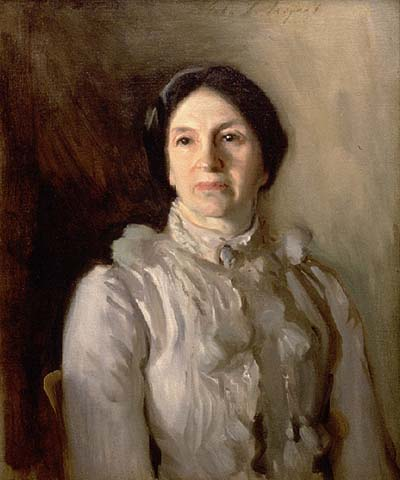
- Annie Adams Fields by John Singer Sargent, 1890
- Born: Annie Adams; June 6, 1834; Boston, Massachusetts, U.S.
- Died: January 5, 1915 (aged 80)
- Resting place: Mount Auburn Cemetery
- Occupation: Writer
- Writing career
- Language: English

Annie Adams Fields (June 6, 1834 – January 5, 1915) was an American writer. Among her writings are collections of poetry and essays as well as several memoirs and biographies of her literary acquaintances. She was also interested in philanthropic work, in which she found her greatest pleasure. Her later years were spent as a companion to author Sarah Orne Jewett.

== Adolescence ==
Fields attended George B. Emerson's School for Young Ladies, Boston's most influential private secondary school for girls, where students were taught to read independently and trained to appreciate nature. She followed Emerson's advice about ongoing education by studying foreign languages, literature, nature, history, travel books, and biography, and cultivating one's "power of expression." Upon his suggestion, Fields began to keep a diary, though she usually kept her own feelings out of it. She sometimes recorded good thoughts or beautiful images which are presented or suggested by observing, reading, or conversing, and she often concentrated on recording table talk of her, often, eminent guests. The fullest congruence of Emerson's advice to his students and Annie Field's activities stems from his repeated insistence that "every good life is necessarily devoted, directly or indirectly, to the service of mankind."

== Biography ==
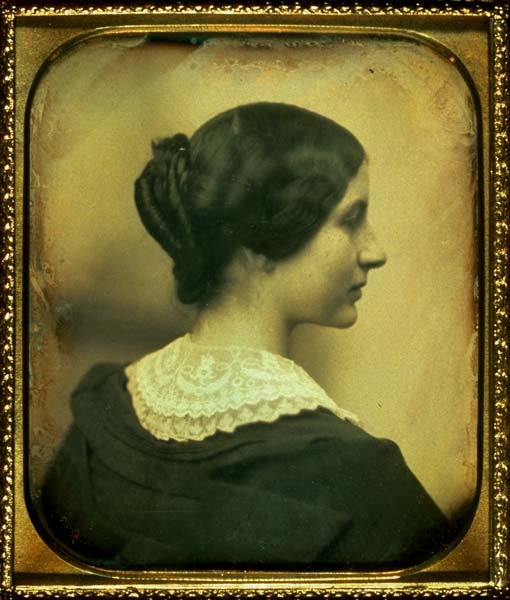
Daguerreotype of American writer Annie Adams Fields (1834–1915).

=== 1834–1881 ===
She was born Ann West Adams in Boston, Massachusetts, on June 9, 1834, the sixth of seven children of Zabdiel Boylston Adams and Sarah May Holland Adams. Among her siblings was her brother Zabdiel Boylston Adams Jr. As a girl, she was enrolled at the School for Young Ladies in Boston operated by George Barrell Emerson, where she was encouraged to read, learned Italian, developed an interest in self-expression, and came to appreciate nature.

She married James T. Fields on November 15, 1854, in King's Chapel in Boston with a service conducted by Reverend Ezra Stiles Gannett. She was his second wife; his first was a cousin of hers. Her husband was a well-established and respected publisher and with him she encouraged up and coming writers such as Sarah Orne Jewett, Mary Eleanor Wilkins Freeman, and Emma Lazarus. She was equally at home with great and established figures including Ralph Waldo Emerson and Harriet Beecher Stowe, whose biography she compiled. At their home at 148 Charles Street in Boston, she established a regular literary salon where authors gathered. Fields was also a philanthropist and social reformer; in particular, she founded the Holly Tree Inns, coffeehouses serving inexpensive and nutritious meals, and the Lincoln Street Home, a safe and inexpensive residence for unmarried working women.

Fields and her husband became close personal friends with many of the authors with whom the publishing house worked, often hosting them at their home for dinner parties and overnight stays. In 1868, however, Fields's friend Mary Abigail Dodge ("Gail Hamilton") became suspicious of poor treatment by Ticknor and Fields and believed she deserved a higher royalty payment. James Fields initially ignored her complaints. Dodge abruptly ended her friendship with Annie Fields in February. A month later, Fields recorded her distress over the situation in her journal: "We do not forget to feel still the savagery... of Gail Hamilton... I really thought she cared for me! And now to find it was a pretense or a stepping-stone merely is something to shudder over. And all for a little of this world's poor money!" After months of dispute, Dodge anonymously published A Battle of the Books in 1870 chronicling her negative experiences.

=== 1881–1915 ===
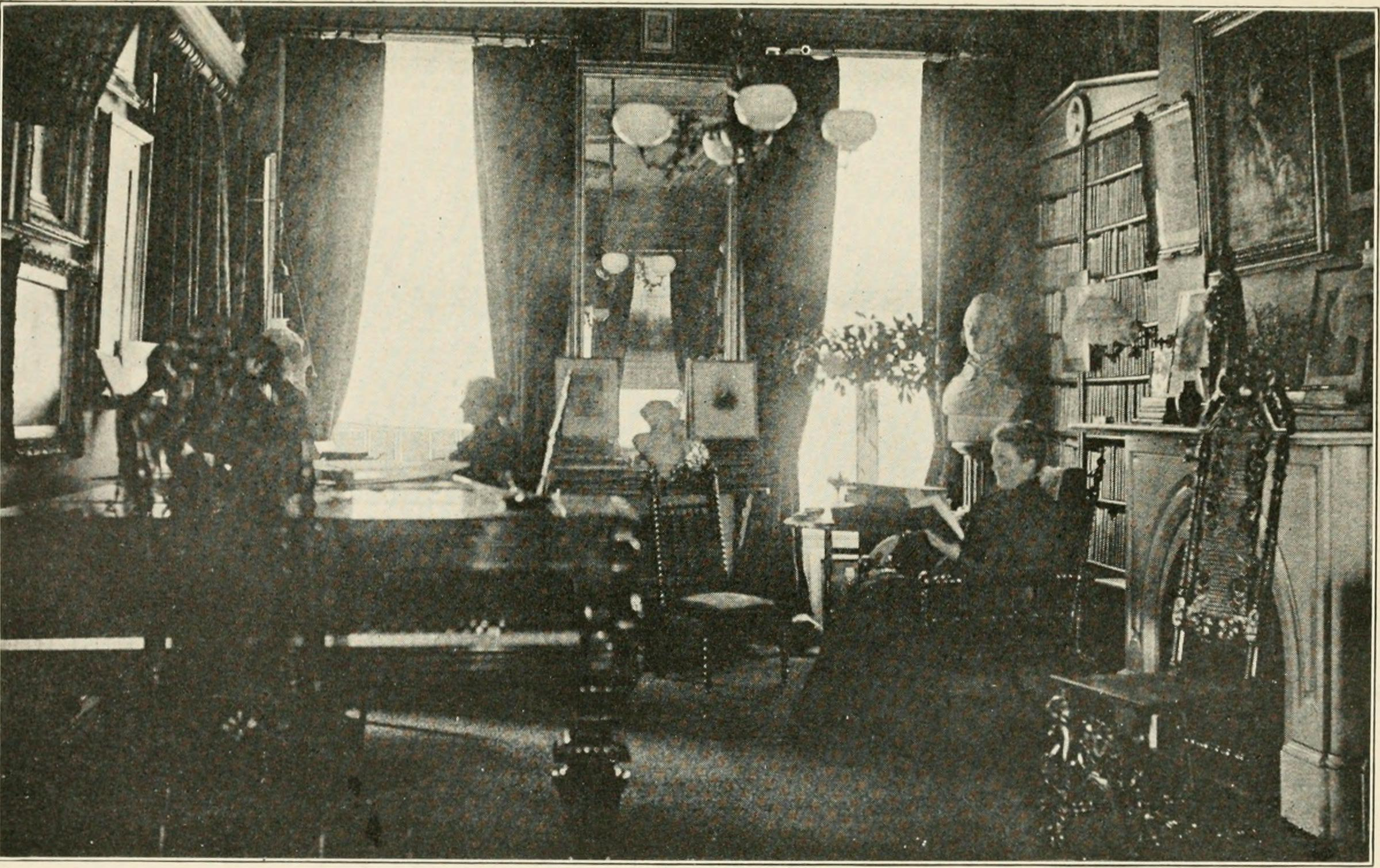
Fields in her Charles Street home's library with companion Sarah Orne Jewett, published 1922

After Fields's husband died in 1881, she continued to occupy the center of Boston literary life. The hallmark of Fields's work is a sympathetic understanding of her friends, who happened to be the leading literary figures of her time.

Her closest friend was Sarah Orne Jewett, a novelist and story writer whom her husband had published in The Atlantic. Jewett paid a condolence visit to Annie Fields and Fields found solace in subsequent visits from Jewett. Jewett spent the winter of 1881–1882 with Fields at her Boston home. From then on, they shared their homes with one another for about half the year in Manchester-by-the-Sea, MA, and the other half of the year at 148 Charles Street in Boston.

The English writer Mary Cowden Clarke referred to Fields and Jewett as a "woman-couple" but they were more commonly referred to as having a "Boston marriage." Though some scholars have offered a cautious appraisal of the nature of the relationship between Jewett and Fields, modern scholarship documents evidence that Jewett and Fields considered themselves married. Jewett and Fields exchanged rings and vows, and on the one-year anniversary of their vows, Jewett wrote a poem, "Do You Remember, Darling," depicting her commitment to and love of Fields.

Fields and Jewett lived together for the rest of Jewett's life (Jewett died in 1909). The two also traveled together, including in 1882 when they visited Ireland, England, Norway, Belgium, France, Switzerland and Italy together. During the trip, Fields's networks allowed them to meet with European authors like Charles Reade, William Makepeace Thackeray, and the family of Charles Dickens. They visited Europe again together in 1892, 1898, and 1900.

After Jewett's death, Fields published her correspondence with Jewett in Letters of Sarah Orne Jewett in 1911. Women in Boston marriages in the 19th century most often kept their correspondence private or destroyed it, so the survival and publication of Jewett and Fields' letters provides rare documentation of one of the most famous Boston marriages of the time. Though deeply personal passages were edited out after urging from their mutual friend Mark Antony De Wolfe Howe leading some biographers to describe Jewett and Fields's relationship as a friendship, the correspondence depicts their deep love for each other.

== Legacy ==
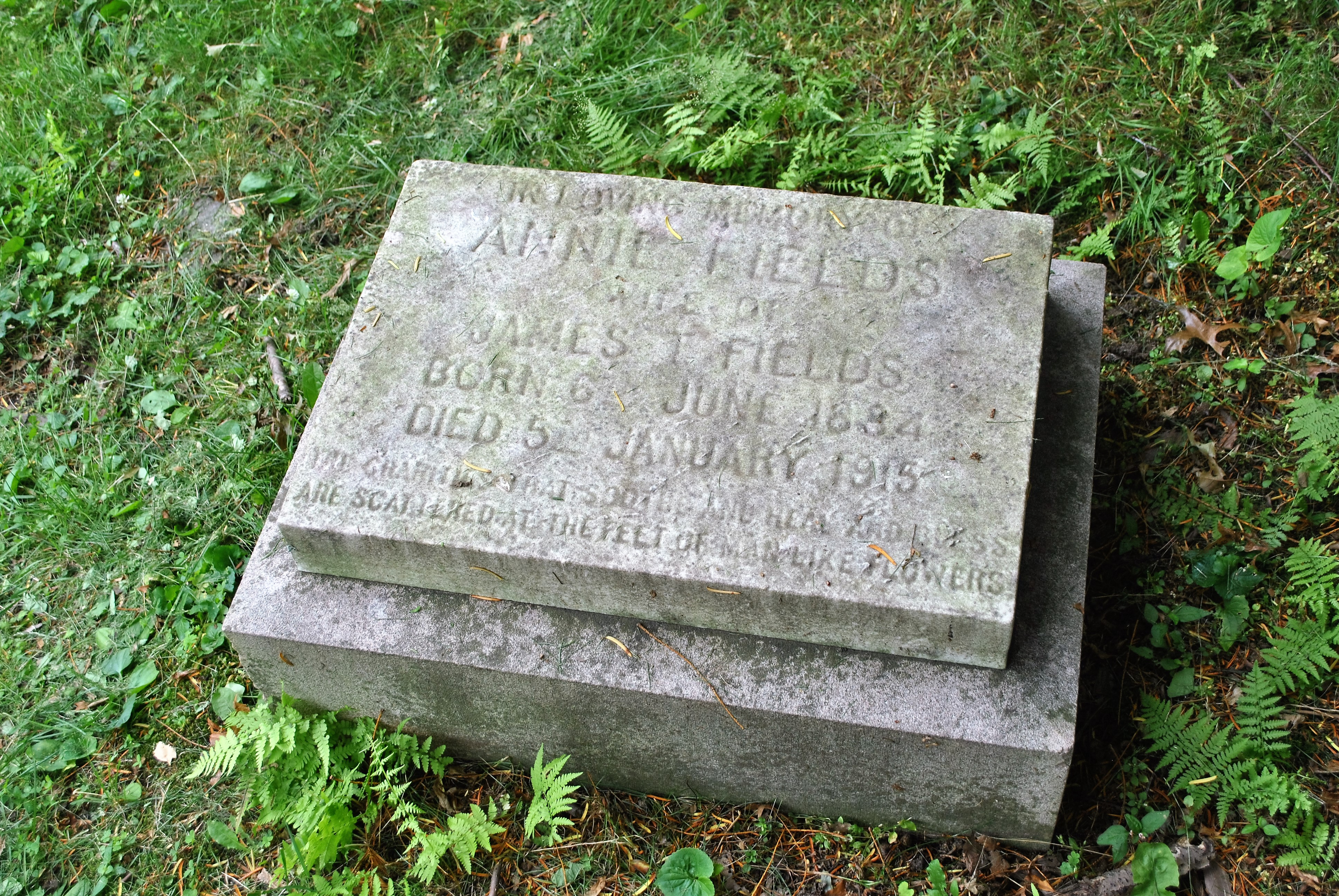
Headstone of Annie Adams Fields at Mount Auburn Cemetery, Cambridge, MA

Fields died in 1915 and is buried at Mount Auburn Cemetery, Cambridge, alongside her husband. Fields's literary importance lies primarily in two areas: one is the influence she exerted over her husband in the selection of works to be published by Ticknor and Fields, the major publishing house of the time. He valued her judgement as reflecting a woman's point of view.

Second, Fields edited important collections of letters and biographical sketches. Her subjects included her husband, James T. Fields, John Greenleaf Whittier, Celia Thaxter, and Harriet Beecher Stowe, as well as the Jewett letter collection. While these are not critical, scholarly works (the Jewett collection, especially, is heavily edited), they do provide primary material for the researcher. Her book Authors and Friends (1896) is a series of sketches, the best of which are of Harriet Beecher Stowe and Celia Thaxter. Fields's diaries remain unpublished, except for excerpts published by M. A. DeWolfe Howe in 1922.

She and her husband were friends with many of the main literary figures of their time, including Willa Cather, Mary Ellen Chase, William Dean Howells, Henry James, Rudyard Kipling, Harriet Beecher Stowe, Alfred Tennyson, Oliver Wendell Holmes, Mark Twain, Sarah Wyman Whitman, Henry Wadsworth Longfellow, Nathaniel Hawthorne, Lydia Maria Child, Charles Dudley Warner and John Greenleaf Whittier.

Fields remains a somewhat puzzling figure. Her writings reflect a traditional orientation toward sentimentalism and the cult of true womanhood. However, she was a supporter of "women's emancipation", and her relationship with Jewett and others suggests a less traditional side. She left for posterity a carefully polished public persona, that of the perfect hostess, the genteel lady, and it is difficult to find the real person underneath.

The site of her Charles Street home is a stop on the Boston Women's Heritage Trail.

== Writings ==
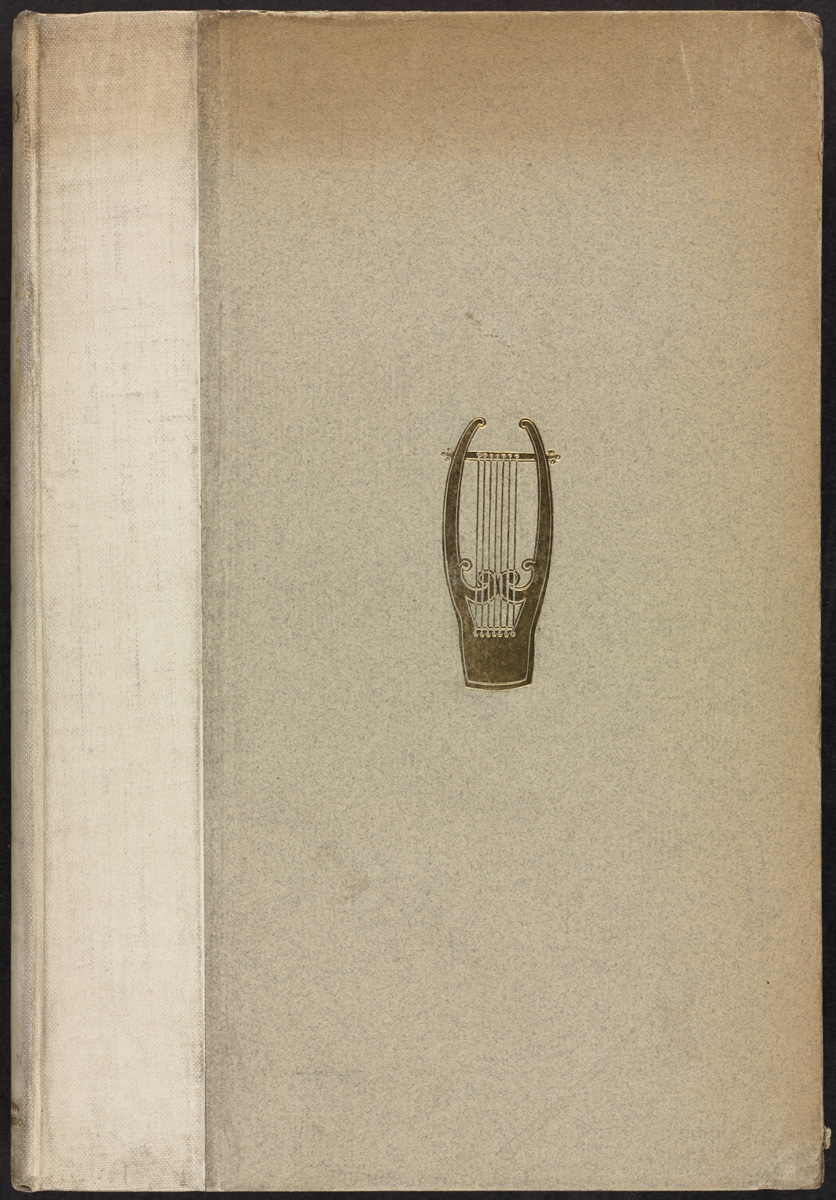
Orpheus: A Masque, 1900

- Ode (1863)
- Asphodel (1866)
- The Children of Lebanon (1872)
- James T. Fields, Biographical Notes and Personal Sketches (1881)
- Under the Olive (1881)
- Whittier, Notes of His Life and of His Friendship (1883)
- Fields became heavily involved in Boston charity work and wrote a social-welfare manual, How to Help the Poor (1883)
- A Week Away from Time (written anonymously, with others, 1887)
- A Shelf of Old Books (1894)
- The Letters of Celia Thaxter (edited by Fields with R. Lamb, 1895)
- The Singing Shepherd, and Other Poems (1895)
- Authors and Friends (1896)
- Life and Letters of Harriet Beecher Stowe (edited by Fields, 1897)
- Nathaniel Hawthorne (1899)
- Orpheus: A Masque (1900)
- The Return of Persephone and Orpheus (1900)
- Charles Dudley Warner (1904)
- Fields edited the Letters of Sarah Orne Jewett (ed., 1911)
- Memories of a Hostess (edited by M. A. De W. Howe, 1922)
- The unpublished diaries of Annie Adams Fields are at the Massachusetts Historical Society.
