= Mary Sheldon Barnes =

American educator and historian

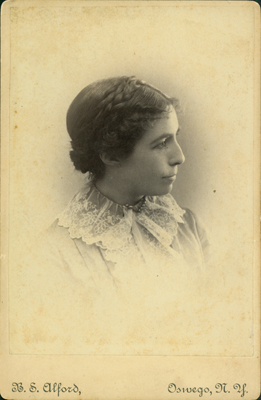
- Mary Sheldon Barnes, date unknown
- Born: Mary Downing Sheldon; September 15, 1850; Oswego, New York, United States
- Died: August 27, 1898 (aged 47); London, England
- Education: University of Michigan; Oswego Normal School
- Occupations: Educator; Historian
- Employers: Stanford University 1892-1897; Wellesley College 1877-1879; Oswego Normal School 1869-1871, 1874-1876, 1882-188

Mary Downing Sheldon Barnes (September 15, 1850 – August 27, 1898) was an American educator and historian. Her teaching style and publications were considered ahead of their time. She used a method that encouraged students to develop their own research skills utilizing primary sources and their own problem solving skills. Sheldon was teacher of and major influence on author and socialist Anna Strunsky.

== Biography ==
=== Youth and education ===
Mary Downing Sheldon was born in Oswego, New York, the oldest of five children, to Frances Stiles and Edward Austin Sheldon. Her father was the founder of the Oswego State Normal and Training School, known for its Pestalozzian principles. Her upbringing drastically deviated from traditional nineteenth-century norms, as both her parents encouraged scholarly education and fostered her inquisitive spirit. Sheldon attended Oswego public schools and a dual program at Oswego Normal, graduating in 1869 as a certified teacher with specialized training in classical studies.

After graduation, she taught there for two years, before becoming enrolled in the first coeducational class at University of Michigan in 1871. Sheldon was a founding member of the Quadrantic Circle, a precursor to sororities. While at Michigan, she studied extensively under the direction of Moses Coit Tyler, a professor of English language and literature within historical and political contexts. She also studied under Charles Kendall Adams, a proponent of the German seminar method of teaching history However, she also took particular interest in the natural sciences. She graduated with an AB in classical studies in 1874.

=== Teaching and career ===
Sheldon returned to Oswego State Normal after her graduation to teach history, Latin, Greek and botany. In January 1877 she began teaching at Wellesley College in the English and history departments for two and a half years. Her teaching style was considered unorthodox at the time, using the case method process introduced by her father in the Oswego Movement. Drawing from the teachings of Pestalozzi and Leopold von Ranke, Sheldon encouraged helping students build problem-solving skills while learning historical inquiry. She encouraged her students to move beyond rote memorization. Rather than a textbook, she used a collection of primary source reproductions. With firsthand reading of powerful documents of history, students could generate a dialogue about history's biggest questions. However, faculty at Wellesley disapproved of her methods. In 1879 she resigned due to poor health and internal conflicts at the college, leaving behind teaching to travel abroad and rest. In 1882 she returned to Oswego Normal to write her work Studies in General History, which was published in 1885 for secondary-school students.

On August 6, 1885, she married Earl Barnes, a former student, who was eleven years her junior. While Barnes taught at various universities, Sheldon concentrated on her writing and collaboration with historian Andrew Dickson White. In 1891 Barnes was appointed head of the department of education at Stanford University, where he implemented her method studies of educational history and child development. In March 1892 Sheldon joined the department of history at Stanford as the first female faculty member. As an assistant professor, she taught 19th-century European and Pacific Slope history. The couple collaborated on Studies in American History which was published in 1891 for eighth-grade students. However, Sheldon owned the copyright to the text. She also conducted research in four California school districts regarding the source method and educational philosophy, through which she designed a history curriculum that accounted for developmental changes. Sheldon would go on to publish Studies in Historical Method, which was directed towards teachers and layman historians interested in learning about historical method. In 1897, the couple resigned from Stanford to travel and write in Europe.

== Death and legacy ==
Sheldon's health had always been of serious concern, and her chronic illness worsened while abroad. She underwent an unsuccessful new medical procedure to treat an organic heart disease. On August 27, 1898, she died in London. Per her request, Barnes buried her in a Protestant cemetery in Rome.

Her teaching method encouraged students to "study the primary sources in an 'independent and solitary' way using her questions as guides to problem solving...in order to develop the students abilities to observe, weigh evidence, to generalize and to exercise creative historical imagination." This approach was described as progressive for the time, utilizing a case method that "hastened the improvement of more conventional history textbooks." Studies in General History incited debate among leading historians and educators. The American Historical Association's Committee of Seven issued a report in 1899, rejecting Sheldon's approach to teaching. The panel, chaired by Andrew C. McLaughlin, recommended "limited contact with a limited body of materials, an examination of which may show the child the nature of the historical process." Though largely ignored in print, her teaching philosophy, especially in relation to critical thinking for students, influenced the curricular structure of general education courses in the mid-twentieth century. However, modern critics of Sheldon's work note her limited sociocultural views and blinding patriotism.

In 1985 and 1986, the Mary Sheldon Barnes Papers and Earl Barnes Papers were donated to the Sophia Smith Collection at Smith College by Betty Barnes, the daughter-in-law of Earl Barnes, and his second wife, Anna Koehler Barnes.

== List of works ==
=== Books ===
- Barnes, Mary Sheldon (1885). Studies in General History. Boston, Health & Co., 1885.
- Studies in American History. Boston, Heath & Co., 1891.
- Studies in Greek and Roman History, 1894.
- Studies in Historical Method, 1896.

=== Essays ===
- Barnes, Mary Sheldon (1879).
- — (May 1882). "Poor White Trash". Cornhill Magazine 45: 579–584.
- — (July 1895). "History: A Definition and a Forecast". Annals of the American Academy of Political and Social Science 6 (5): 285–290.
- — (July 1889). "General History in the High School". The Academy: Journal of Secondary Education 4 (5): 285–290.
- Barnes, Earl and Mary Sheldon (April 1898). "Collections of Sources in English for History Teachers". Educational Review 15: 331–338.
