= Holly Tree Inn =

Defunct restaurants in the United States

The Holly Tree Inns were a system of inexpensive eating establishments in the northeastern United States in the 1870s. They were founded by Annie Adams Fields, wife of Boston publisher James T. Fields. The first of them was founded in December 1870.

== Overview ==
These institutions, operated as non-profits, served meals but no liquor. They were intended to "provide substantial food at cost prices" to working women. Of them, a reporter wrote that "an average of two-thirds of those who avail themselves of the privileges are persons who do not really need to economize, while one-third, consisting of milliners, shop-girls, etc. live at the place from motives of economy, and save fully two-thirds in board." He noted that they were successfully competing with the free lunches offered by saloons.

The first of three Holly Trees opened in Chicago in June 1872, and Gollin says that "over the next few years dozens of other Holly Trees opened in other cities, many of them after consultation with Annie."

An 1874 New York Times article refers to a "Holly-Tree Coffee-house Movement."

The name was a tribute to Charles Dickens. It echoed the title of a Charles Dickens story, "The Boots at the Holly Tree Inn." The story merely names the inn in passing; the 1855 issue of Household Words was entitled The Holly Tree Inn and was a collection of pieces and stories about the fictitious inn. Gollin notes that Fields heard Dickens read the story on an 1867 visit to Boston, and Fields was touched by the "cheerful Christmas story about warm relationships that cross class divisions." The name was also a reference to "the beneficent holly tree at [Dickens'] graveside."
