= Buffalo Soldiers (2001 film) =

2001 film directed by Gregor Jordan

- Theatrical release poster
- Directed by: Gregor Jordan
- Written by: Gregor Jordan; Eric Weiss; Nora Maccoby
- Based on: Buffalo Soldiers; 1993 novel by Robert O'Connor
- Produced by: Rainer Grupe; Ariane Moody
- Starring: Joaquin Phoenix; Ed Harris; Scott Glenn; Anna Paquin; Gabriel Mann; Leon Robinson; Dean Stockwell; Haluk Bilginer
- Cinematography: Oliver Stapleton
- Edited by: Lee Smith
- Music by: David Holmes
- Production companies: FilmFour; Odeon Pictures; Good Machine International; Grosvenor Park Productions; Gorilla Entertainment; Strange Fiction Films
- Distributed by: FilmFour Productions (through Pathé Distribution) (United Kingdom); Odeon Film (Germany); Miramax Films (United States); Good Machine International (International)
- Release dates: 8 September 2001 (TIFF); 18 July 2003 (United Kingdom); 25 July 2003 (United States)
- Running time: 98 minutes
- Countries: United Kingdom; United States; Germany
- Language: English
- Budget: $15 million
- Box office: $2.3 million

Buffalo Soldiers is a 2001 satirical black comedy directed and co-written by Gregor Jordan, based on the 1993 novel of the same name by Robert O'Connor. The film stars Joaquin Phoenix, Ed Harris, Scott Glenn, Anna Paquin and Dean Stockwell. It follows a group of American soldiers stationed in West Germany during 1989, just before the fall of the Berlin Wall.

Buffalo Soldiers had its world premiere at the 26th Toronto International Film Festival on 8 September 2001, and was theatrically released in the United Kingdom by Pathé Distribution on 18 July 2003. The film began a limited release in the United States on 25 July 2003, followed by a wide release on 8 August 2003, by Miramax Films. It earned five nominations at the 6th British Independent Film Awards, including Best British Independent Film and Best Actor for Phoenix.

== Plot ==
In 1989, U.S. Army Supply Specialist (SPC) Ray Elwood is a disillusioned enlisted soldier stationed in Stuttgart, West Germany. With much spare time, he participates in black marketeering and cooking heroin for several corrupt Military Police (MPs) led by the menacing Sergeant Saad. His firm yet empathic Commanding Officer, Colonel Berman, thinks of SPC Elwood as a close friend and has no idea he's stealing Brigade Command supplies and having an affair with his wife. However, Elwood's uneventful existence changes when a new First Sergeant (“Top” / 1SG), Robert E. Lee, joins the Brigade's supply company. Lee is a Vietnam combat veteran who presents a strict and intimidating demeanor, quickly determining that Elwood and his squad are engaged in graft and other criminal activities.

A three-man Army tank crew, under the strong influence of the heroin that Elwood cooked for the MPs, unintentionally kills two soldiers in charge of a weapons truck convoy by randomly crashing through a gas station's gasoline pumps and detonating them. Elwood stumbles across the trucks, discovers and steals the weapons, and hides them in medical equipment boxes stored at a missile base. When later harassed by Lee for his extravagant barracks room, Elwood's attempt at bribery backfires; Lee subsequently revokes Elwood's privileges, destroys his property, and orders a new, inexperienced and by-the-book Soldier, PFC Knoll, to bunk in his room. To get back at Lee, Elwood begins a sexual relationship with his daughter, Robyn. Lee retaliates by making Elwood destroy his beloved Mercedes-Benz Coupé with an M60 machine gun during a live-fire weapons exercise. Lee also boobytraps a locker that is used to hide heroin with a grenade that kills Stoney, one of Elwood's friends.

Elwood sells the stolen weapons to a Turkish gangster, accepting a large amount of raw opium as payment. However, to save Knoll from being killed by Saad in a fight, Elwood is forced to make Saad a business partner in cooking the opium. In order to retrieve the weapons from the missile base and collect the drugs, Elwood sells out Berman so a competing infantry regiment can easily capture their positions during a mobilization/defense operations exercise. Later, Berman reluctantly tells Elwood he has been relieved from Brigade Command but this has given him time to reflect — he will retire from the Army and buy a vineyard in California.

On 9 November, the night the Berlin Wall comes down, Elwood sneaks to the base swimming pool to meet Robyn while the opium is being cooked by his squad and the MPs. Knoll and Lee arrive. Elwood then discovers Knoll is actually an undercover 2nd Lieutenant from the Inspector General's Office and Criminal Investigation Division. While Knoll escorts Robyn away, she tells him her father intends to kill Elwood, something Knoll – as a professional officer – cannot allow. Meanwhile, Saad, intoxicated by the overwhelming opium fumes, provokes a shootout with Special Forces commandos sent to arrest everyone in the drug lab. Upstairs, just as Knoll prevents Lee at gunpoint from pushing Elwood out of a top-floor window, the building explodes from escaping butane and industrial solvent. Elwood and Lee are blown out of the building's top floor by the massive impact. Elwood strangles Lee with his handcuffs and lands on top of him, surviving the fall.

In the aftermath, the Army's top commanders posthumously award Lee a Silver Star and also decorate Elwood, who is transferred to a new assignment in Hawaii. He tells his new commanding officer, who is just as dull-witted as Colonel Berman, that Robyn remains his girlfriend and she will be visiting soon. The film ends with Elwood submitting a requisition order for more supplies.

== Cast ==
- Joaquin Phoenix as Specialist (SPC) Ray Elwood
- Ed Harris as Colonel (COL) Berman
- Scott Glenn as First Sergeant (1SG) Robert E. Lee
- Anna Paquin as Robyn Lee
- Gabriel Mann as PFC/2LT Brian Knoll
- Elizabeth McGovern as Mrs. Berman
- Michael Peña as Garcia
- Leon Robinson as SPC Stoney
- Dean Stockwell as Major General Lancaster
- Brian Delate as Colonel Marshall
- Glenn Fitzgerald as SGT Hicks
- Idris Elba as Kimborough
- Haluk Bilginer as The Turk
- Sheik Mahmud-Bey as SGT Saad
- Roger Griffiths as Simmons

== Production ==
Filming took place in Baden-Württemberg, Germany. Several former US Army bases that had recently been handed back to German control, like the depot at Siegelsbach, were used as locations. The US Army declined to support the film, so military vehicles had to be rented from commercial companies and private collectors, and though a US tank platoon, it is equipped with Leopard 1 tanks.

== Release ==
The world premiere was held at the 2001 Toronto International Film Festival in early September. However, being a satire of the US military, the film's wider theatrical run was delayed by approximately two years because of the September 11 attacks. Angry viewers objected to alleged "anti-American" sentiments of the film, deeming it "unpatriotic". At a press conference a woman threw a water bottle at Anna Paquin. By the time the film was eventually released in the US on July 25, 2003, much of the momentum of the film had dissolved, and the positive reviews of the film did not help its reception.

== Reception ==
Buffalo Soldiers has a rating of 73% on Rotten Tomatoes based on 115 reviews with an average score of 6.55 out of 10. The consensus states: "Overall, this caustic comedy hits more of its targets than it misses." The film also has a score of 56 out of 100 on Metacritic based on 35 reviews, indicating "mixed or average" reviews.
