= James Johonnot =

James Johonnot (1823–1888) was a New York State educator.

Born in Bethel, Vermont, he attended school at the New England Seminary in Windsor. In 1845, he became principal of Jefferson School in Syracuse. In 1848 he graduated from the State Normal School in Albany. Starting in 1850, he was employed as an agent for publishers D. Appleton & Company, and in 1853 he was elected state agent of the New York State Teachers' Association. From 1861 to 1866, he was principal of the high school at Joliet, Illinois. In 1872, he was elected principal of the State Normal School at Warrensburg, Missouri, where he remained until 1875. He then served as superintendent of schools for one year in Deposit, New York, and then lived from 1876 to 1880 in Ithaca, New York. After 1880 he lived in Princeton, NJ with his son-in-law, a professor at Princeton College.

He was the author of Principles and Practice of Teaching, Country School-Houses: Containing Elevations, Plans, and Specifications, and many other works, was joint author of Kruesi's Drawing Books, and assisted in the preparation of Appleton's Geographies.

His Ten Great Events in History (1887) starts as follows:

The great events in history are those where, upon special occasions, a man or a people have made a stand against tyranny, and have preserved or advanced freedom for the people. Sometimes tyranny has taken the form of the oppression of the many by the few in the same nation, and sometimes it has been the oppression of a weak nation by a stronger one....

Johonnot's "Ten Great Events" are the following:

- i. – Defense of freedom by Greek valor
- ii. – Crusades and the Crusaders
- iii. – Defense of freedom in Alpine passes
- iv. – Bruce and Bannockburn
- v. – Christopher Columbus and the New World
- vi. – Defense of freedom on Dutch dikes
- vii. – The invincible armada
- viii. – Freedom's voyage to America
- ix. – Plassey; and how an empire was won
- x. – Lexington and Bunker hill

Johonnot's work on T.H. Huxley has been referred to by Cyril Bibby.

== List of publications ==
- School-Houses
- Country School-Houses: Containing Elevations, Plans, and Specifications
- Principles and Practice of Teaching
- Ten Great Events in History
- Glimpses of the animate world; or, Science and literature of natural history, for school and home
- A geographical reader
- A natural history reader for school and home
- Friends in feathers and fur, and other neighbors : for young folks
- Neighbors with claws and hoofs, and their kin. For boys and girls
- Neighbors with wings and fins, and some others : for young people
- School
- Some curious flyers, creepers and swimmers
- Stories of our country
- A Natural History Reader, for school and home (1883)—a compilation of articles. (digital copy)
