= John Townsend Trowbridge =

American author (1827–1916)

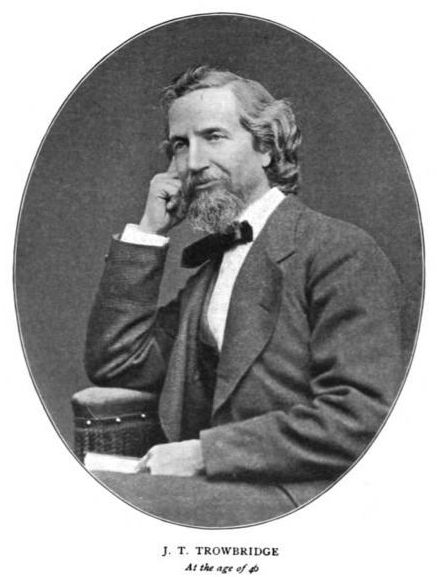
- Trowbridge, c. 1873
- Born: September 18, 1827; Ogden, New York, US
- Died: February 12, 1916 (aged 88); Arlington, Massachusetts, US
- Occupation: Author
- Spouses: Cornelia Warren (m. 1860; died 1864) Sarah Adelaide Newton (m. 1873)
- Writing career
- Pen name: Paul Creyton
- Genres: Fiction, non-fiction, children's literature, poetry

John Townsend Trowbridge (September 18, 1827 – February 12, 1916) was an American author.

== Early life ==
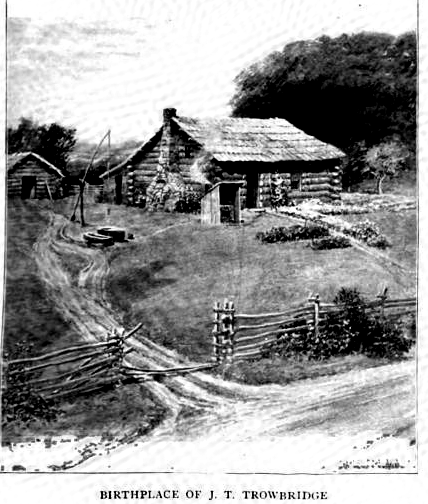
Birthplace of John Townsend Trowbridge. Showing the out-door oven and the Rochester Road. Drawn by Charles Copeland, from descriptions furnished by John T. Trowbridge and his eldest sister Mrs. Greene.

Trowbridge was born in Ogden, New York, to Windsor Stone Trowbridge and Rebecca Willey. His birthplace was a log cabin his father constructed through the use of wooden pegs. Trowbridge received an unremarkable education, but had an early interest in literature. He recalled in his autobiography that he wrote his first poem at age 13. His first published work was published anonymously in the Rochester Republican when he was 16.

He started working as a teacher and on a farm for one year in Illinois. In 1847, at age 19, he moved to New York City to become an author and, with the assistance of Mordecai Manuel Noah, began publishing in periodicals while also working at a pencil case engraving factory. He moved to Boston in August 1848, and in 1850, during the absence of Benjamin Perley Poore in Washington, D.C., edited Poore's paper, the Sentinel, but his editorial on the fugitive-slave law nearly destroyed the paper's popularity. He married Cornelia Warren (May 1, 1834 – March 23, 1864) in 1860. After her death, he remarried to Sarah Adelaide Newton in 1873.

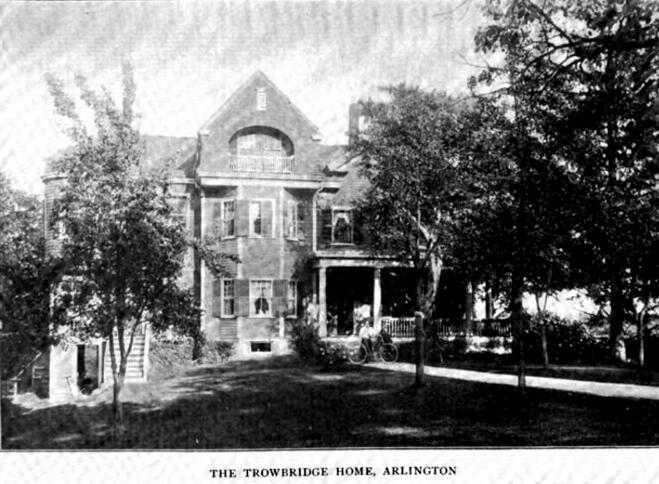
Trowbridge's house at 152 Pleasant Street, Arlington, Massachusetts

In June 1867, Trowbridge bought a house at 152 Pleasant Street, Arlington, Massachusetts where he lived until his death on February 12, 1916. Trowbridge also spent much time in Kennebunkport, Maine, where he built Spouting Rock Cottage, near to Spouting Rock and Blowing Cave, both of which he named.

== Writing career ==
His novels include Neighbor Jackwood (1857), an antislavery novel; The Old Battle-Ground (1859); Cudjo's Cave (1864); The Three Scouts (1865); Lucy Arlyn (1866); Neighbors' Wives (1867); Coupon Bonds, and Other Stories (1873); and Farnell's Folly. Another is Evening At The Farm.

Trowbridge wrote numerous works under the pseudonym of Paul Creyton, including The Midshipman's Revenge (1849), Kate the Accomplice, or, The Preacher and the Burglar (1849), The Deserted Family, or, Wanderings of an Outcast (1853), Father Brighthopes, or, An Old Clergyman's Vacation (1853), Burr Cliff: its Sunshine and its Clouds (1853); Martin Merrivale: His X Mark (1854), Iron Thorpe (1855), Neighbor Jackwood (1857).

Among his very many juvenile tales are The Drummer Boy, The Prize Cup, The Lottery Ticket, The Tide-Mill Stories, The Toby Trafford Series, The Little Master, and the Jack Hazard series. His published volumes of verse include: The Vagabonds, and Other Poems; The Emigrant's Story, and Other Poems; A Home Idyl, and Other Poems; The Lost Earl; and The Book of Gold, and Other Poems. The Vagabonds, At Sea, and Midsummer are among his best-known poems. His long poem Guy Vernon: A Novelette in Verse was first published anonymously in the compilation A Masque of Poets (1878).

In Darius Green and his Flying Machine, Trowbridge penned the following prophetic verse: "Darius was clearly of the opinion / That the air is also man's dominion / And that with paddle or fin or pinion, / We soon or late shall navigate / The azure as now we sail the sea."

He is today perhaps best remembered for his study The South: A Tour of Its Battlefields and Ruined Cities (1867, republished two years later with additions by another author as A Picture of the Desolated States and the Work of Reconstruction, 1865-1868). Trowbridge toured much of the defeated Confederacy during the summer of 1865 and the following winter. He observed carefully, and talked with a wide variety of people of both sexes, including freedmen, die-hard Rebels, Unionists, farmers, businessmen, refugees, and Northern entrepreneurs. In his book, he lets these people speak in their own voices, often adding his own comments. His book can profitably be read with those of John Richard Dennett (The South As It Is: 1865-1866) and Whitelaw Reid (After the War: A Tour of the Southern States, 1865-1866). All three accounts are written from the perspective of a loyal and fair Northerner genuinely concerned about conditions in the South and the evolving policies of the United States towards that section.

From 1865 to 1873 Trowbridge was co-editor with Lucy Larcom of Our Young Folks. Since his death he has been well known as a friend of Mark Twain and Walt Whitman.

Trowbridge's papers are located at Houghton Library at Harvard University.

== Selected works ==
- The Midshipman's Revenge (1849)
- Kate the Accomplice, or, The Preacher and the Burglar (1849)
- The Deserted Family, or, Wanderings of an Outcast (1853)
- Father Brighthopes, or, An Old Clergyman's Vacation (1853)
- Burr Cliff: its Sunshine and its Clouds (1853)
- Martin Merrivale: His X Mark (1854)
- Iron Thorpe (1855)
- Neighbor Jackwood (1857)
- The Old Battle-Ground (1859)
- Cudjo's Cave (1864)
- The Three Scouts (1865)
- Lucy Arlyn (1866)
- Neighbors' Wives (1867)
- The Vagabonds, and Other Poems (1869)
- Lawrence's Adventures Among the Ice-cutters, Glass-makers, Coal-miners, Iron-men, and Ship-builders (1870)
- Coupon Bonds, and Other Stories (1873)
- The Emigrant's Story and Other Poems (1874)
- The Book of Gold and Other Poems (1977)
- Guy Vernon: A Novelette in Verse (1878)
- A Home Idyl and Other Poems (1881)
- Farnell's Folly (1884)
- The New Physics: A Manual of Experimental Study for High Schools and Preparatory Schools for College (1884)
- The Little Master (1886)
- A Start in Life: A Story of the Genesee Country (1888)
- Biding His Time or Andrew Hapnell's Fortune (1888)
- The Lost Earl with Other Poems and Tales in Verse (1888)
- The Kelp-Gatherers: A Story of the Maine Coast (1890)
- The Drummer Boy (1891)
- The Scarlet Tanager and Other Bipeds (1891)
- The Prize Cup (1896)
