= Oswego Movement =

19th-century American education movement

The Oswego Movement (or Oswego Plan as it is sometimes called) was a movement in American education during the late 19th century. It was based on the methods of Johann Heinrich Pestalozzi and introduced by Edward Austin Sheldon at Oswego Primary Teachers' Training School (now State University of New York at Oswego).

== Development ==
As a student, Sheldon hated the memorization used in school at the time and preferred books with interesting pictures. Despite this dislike for school, he was inspired to attend college. After college, he was placed in charge of a small school. During his travels to observe other schools, he discovered the London's Home and Colonial Training Instruction. Sheldon hired British teacher Margaret E. M. Jones to help develop this program further.

Sheldon and his colleagues helped spread object teaching across America by utilizing in-service and pre-service teacher education, a practice school, and education of teacher educators, at a time when most of these things were new.

== Theory ==
The movement introduced the use of "objects", such as models and blocks, into elementary education under the name "object teaching". Sheldon held there were three basic components to education.

1) Education is grounded in the development of human facilities

2) Sense perception creates knowledge, and instruction should be based on observation of objects and events

3) Education must cultivate the senses, not just communicate knowledge

== Results ==
This enlightenment in education shifted the instructional focus to the child, stressing activity and concrete experiences, rather than rote memorization. This method also provided a bridge to the inclusion of learning by doing. The focus shifted to the child and required teachers to be more professional and prepare lesson plans.

Further, the method led to the development of schools for training teachers. The professionalism of many of the female teachers of this school played a part in the women's rights movement.
