= Zabdiel Boylston Adams =

American surgeon (1829–1902)

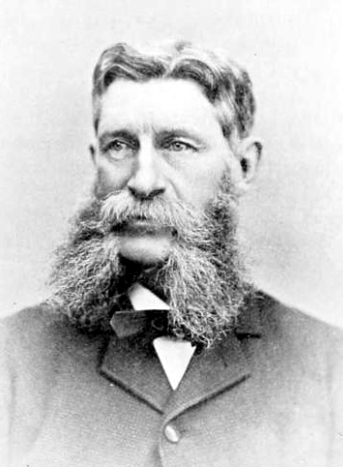
- Born: October 25, 1829; Boston, Massachusetts, U.S.
- Died: May 1, 1902 (aged 72); Southborough, Massachusetts, U.S.
- Burial place: Mount Auburn Cemetery
- Education: Bowdoin College (1849); Harvard Medical School M.D. (1853)
- Occupation: Surgeon
- Relatives: Annie Adams Fields (sister); James T. Fields (brother-in-law)

Dr. Zabdiel Boylston Adams Jr. (October 25, 1829 – May 1, 1902) was an American Civil War surgeon and a graduate of Harvard Medical School (Class of 1853).

== Biography ==
Adams Jr. was the son of Zabdiel Boylston Adams and Sarah May Holland. His siblings included Annie Adams Fields. He married Frances Ann Kidder and had two children. Zabdiel Adams initially attended Harvard College, but graduated from Bowdoin in 1849. He then entered Harvard Medical School and graduated with an M.D. in 1853.

In May 1861, he was commissioned an Assistant Surgeon in the 7th Regiment Massachusetts Volunteer Infantry. He served with the 7th at the battles of Yorktown, Williamsburg, and Fair Oaks. On May 26, 1862, he was commissioned as Head Surgeon for the 32nd Regiment Massachusetts Volunteer Infantry. Adams, according to his great-grandson Mitchell L. Adams, a former member of Harvard's Board of Overseers, labored so long in surgeries at the Battle of Gettysburg — remaining on duty for two days and three nights — that he temporarily became blind with exhaustion. Although he regained his sight, he was discharged. He fought hard to get back into the surgical corps after being mustered out, to no avail. By 1864, Adams resorted to an unusual ploy to extend his service. He gave up battlefield medicine and rejoined the army as an infantry officer, a captain, with the 56th Regiment Massachusetts Volunteer Infantry.

Wounded at the Battle of the Wilderness, and captured by Confederate forces, he was eventually paroled and sent to the Union Hospital in Annapolis, Maryland. Because of his wound, he was discharged from the army. However, he again reapplied, and rejoined the 56th in February 1865, in time for the Siege of Petersburg. He was brevetted Major of the 56th, being promoted for gallantry and meritorious conduct in the assault before Petersburg, Va. on April 2, 1865.

Adams took part in multiple battles, from the Peninsular Campaign to the Battle of Second Bull Run, Battle of Antietam, Fredericksburg, Chancellorsville, Gettysburg, the Battle of the Wilderness, and, in 1865, the Siege of Petersburg, Virginia, that ended the war.

After the war, Adams opened a medical practice in Framingham, Massachusetts. There he also established the public library and invited lecturers to town including his brother-in-law James T. Fields. He married Frances Kidder in 1870, but the two had a difficult marriage. Although he predeceased her, she noted in her will, "inasmuch as he has never done anything for my support and his treatment has been most upsetting and that he has tried to desert his family entirely, I have no wish to leave him anything that belongs to my estate". He died after falling over the Metropolitan Water Works dam in Southborough in 1902 and is buried in Mount Auburn Cemetery, Cambridge, Massachusetts.

== Memorial ==
There is a memorial plaque to Adams mounted on a boulder on the Civil War battlefield in Gettysburg, Pennsylvania. Of over 2,000 memorials there, it is the only one dedicated to a physician. The text reads:

Behind this group of rocks on the afternoon of July 2, 1863
Surgeon Z. Boylston Adams placed the field hospital of the
32nd Massachusetts Infantry, Second Brigade, First Division, Fifth Army Corps
Established so near the line of battle
many of our wounded escaped capture or death by its timely aid.
Placed by the Veterans Association of the Regiment 32nd Mass Hospital

== See also ==
- Dr. Zabdiel Boylston, FRS, (1679 – March 2, 1766)
