= Edward Austin Sheldon =

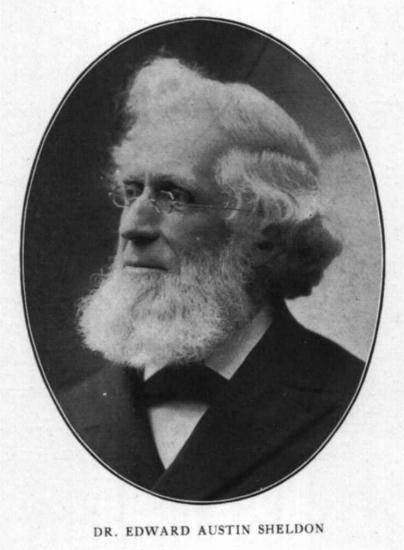

1st President of State University of New York at Oswego
- In office 1861–1897
- Succeeded by: I. B. Poucher

Personal details
- Born: October 4, 1823 Perry Center, New York
- Died: August 26, 1897 (aged 73) Oswego, New York
- Spouse: Frances Stiles Sheldon
- Children: Mary Sheldon Barnes
- Education: Hamilton College
- Profession: Educator

Edward Austin Sheldon (October 4, 1823 – August 26, 1897) was an American educator, and the founding president of the State University of New York at Oswego (then Oswego Primary Teachers' Training School). He also served as superintendent of schools for the cities of Syracuse, New York and Oswego, New York. Sheldon introduced the principles and teachings of Johann Heinrich Pestalozzi into American education through the Oswego Movement. A statute of Sheldon instructing a child was dedicated at the New York State Capitol in January 1900 during a ceremony attended by Governor Theodore Roosevelt and United States Commissioner of Education William Torey Harris. It remained there until 1922 and was later installed on Oswego's campus. His daughter was educator Mary Sheldon Barnes.
