= Helen Gray Cone =

American poet

Helen Gray Cone (March 8, 1859 – January 31, 1934) was a poet and professor of English literature. She spent her entire career at Hunter College in New York City.

== Early life and education ==
Cone was born in New York and attended the Normal College of the City of New York, later renamed Hunter College. She graduated in 1876 as a member of Phi Beta Kappa, and became an instructor in the Normal College English department. In the 1880s she served as president of the Associate Alumnae of the Normal College.

== Career and writings ==
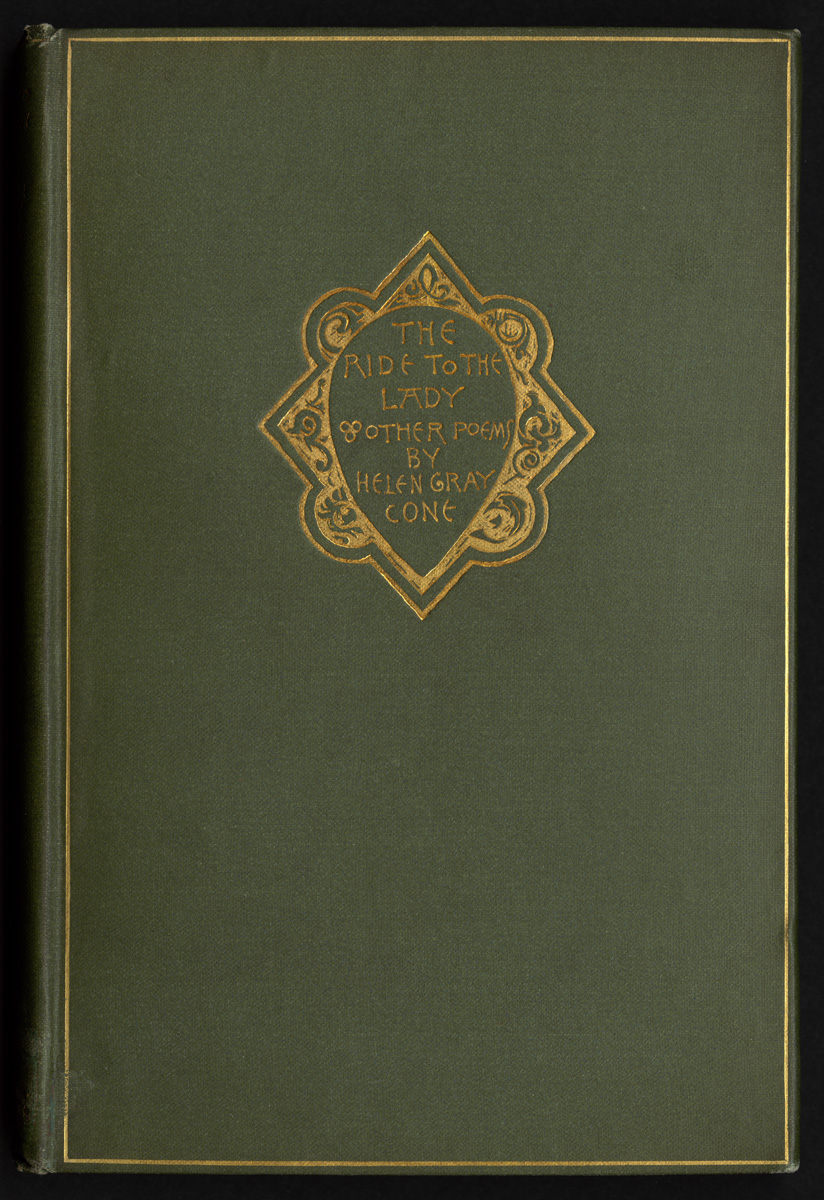
The Ride to the Lady and Other Poems (1891)

Her first book, Oberon and Puck: Verses Grave and Gay was published by Cassell, New York, in 1885. The New York Times received it well, saying, "Miss Cone has the rare talent of compression and the wit not to attempt too high a flight at first." The book was reprinted by Houghton Mifflin in 1893, after that press released her The Ride to the Lady in 1891. She wrote fiction as well in this period, publishing a short story in Harper's Magazine in 1886.

In 1899, she was elected to the Professorship in English after the death of her predecessor in the position. Though the Normal College admitted only female students at the time, Cone was the first woman to hold a professorship there. As sole holder of the title, she was considered department head, a title she retained as the department grew.

Her Soldiers of the Light was published by Richard G. Badger of Boston in 1910. Stephenson Browne commented in the New York Times: "Miss Cone refrains so steadfastly from the arts of the self-advertiser that only those who read all the magazines know how large is the volume of genuine poetry she annually presents in the best of them." A poem from the book, "The Common Street," was published in the Times the following year; it praises the sunset which bursts suddenly into the New York landscape, turning the common street and its denizens, "Each with his sordid burden trudging by," into "A golden highway into golden heaven, / With the dark shapes of men ascending still." Poetry collections A Chant of Love for England (New York: Dutton, 1915) and The Coat Without a Seam (New York: Dutton, 1919) followed.

In addition to poetry and fiction, she wrote literary criticism (her 1890 history of American literature was republished in a 2000 anthology), co-edited Pen-Portraits of Literary Women with Jeanette L. Gilder (New York: Cassell, 1887) and provided notes for Houghton Mifflin's Riverside editions of Shakespeare's Macbeth (1897), Hamlet (1897), Merchant of Venice (1900), and Twelfth Night (1901). A volume of her selected poems was published as Harvest Home (New York: Knickerbocker Press, 1930). She was awarded honorary degrees by New York University in 1908 and Hunter in 1920.

== Legacy at Hunter ==
Cone was frequently called upon to read occasional poems at college functions, from her student days into her retirement. She wrote the college's alma mater.

She retired in 1926, replaced as department head by fiction writer Blanche Colton Williams. In 1927 a fellowship was created in Cone's honor, through donations from students, faculty, and alumni. As of 2020, the Helen Gray Cone Fellowship is still awarded.
