= Eleanor C. Donnelly =

American poet (1838–1917)

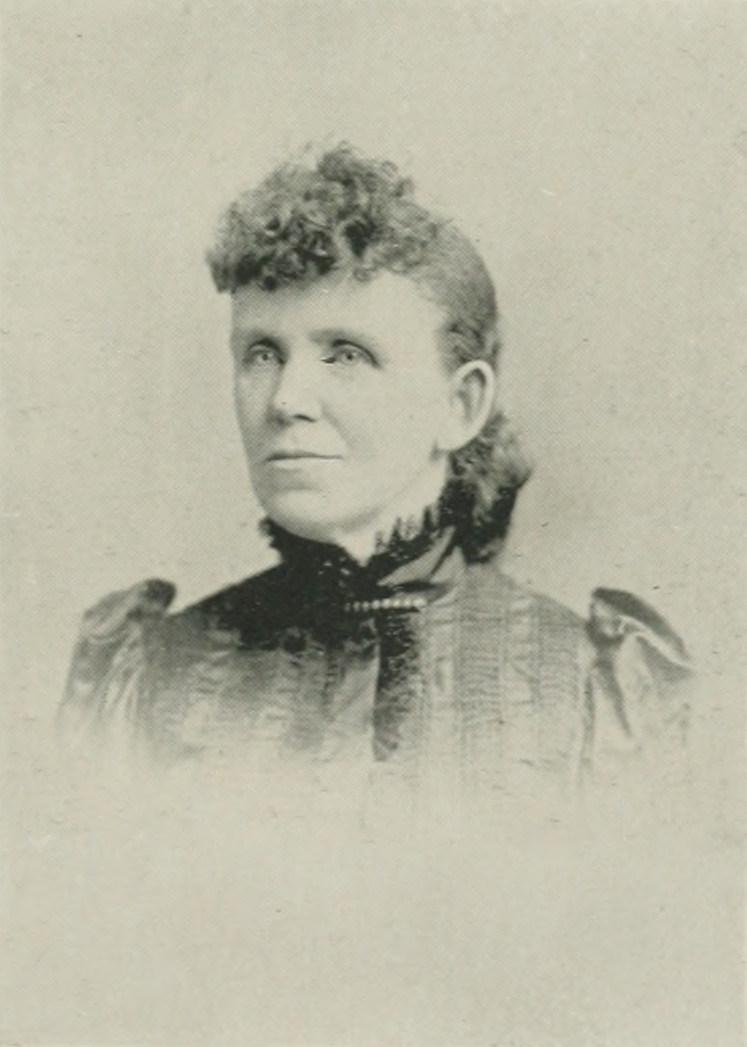
- Born: Eleanor Cecilia Donnelly; September 6, 1838 Philadelphia, Pennsylvania, United States
- Died: April 30, 1917 (aged 78)

Eleanor C. Donnelly (September 6, 1838 – April 30, 1917) was an American poet, short story writer and biographer. She was known as "The Poet of the Pure Soul". Her brother was the lawyer and author Ignatius L. Donnelly, who served as lieutenant governor and U.S. Congressman from the state of Minnesota.

== Early life ==
Eleanor Cecilia Donnelly was born in Philadelphia, Pennsylvania on September 6, 1838, the sixth child of Dr. Philip Carol Donnelly and Catherine Gavin Donnelly. Her father died of typhus when she was still an infant. Educated at home by her mother, Donnelly began to write poetry at age nine, a hymn to the Blessed Virgin, which appeared in a child's paper. Her family encouraged and supported the development of her literary talents. The Donnellys often hosted gatherings of prominent Philadelphia Catholic writers and intellectuals at their home.

== Career ==
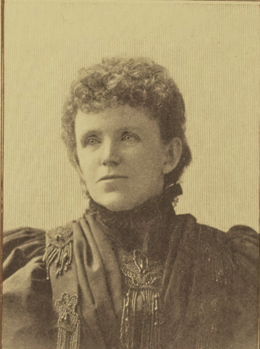
1897

As a young woman Donnelly hoped to enter a religious order. At one point, she tried the convent life but it proved too taxing.

Donnelly composed a number of poems during the early years of the American Civil War, several of which were published, often unattributed and without her permission. Encouraged by her friends and family to protect her claims to these poems, which often dealt with themes of loss and grief, she collected many of them in her first book, Out of Sweet Solitude, published in 1873. A prolific writer, during her lifetime Donnelly published over thirty books, including pamphlets and revised or rearranged editions, and produced hundreds of poems, including a number of collections of children's verse. Her poetry largely addresses Catholic and spiritual themes and she often composed poems to commemorate religious events and celebrations.

She authored two biographies: A Memoir of Father Felix Joseph Barbelin, S.J., on the first president of St. Joseph's College (now St. Joseph's University), and Life of Sister Mary Gonzaga Grace, of the Daughters of Charity of St. Vincent de Paul, 1812-1897, the long-serving administrator of St. Joseph's Orphan Asylum in Philadelphia.

Donnelly also served terms as chief editor of the Augustinian magazine, Our Lady of Good Counsel, and as an associate editor of the Philadelphia Catholic weekly paper, The Catholic Standard and Times.

Donnelly died on April 30, 1917. A long editorial in the local Philadelphia Catholic newspaper described her as "one of the foremost Catholic woman-poets of America". Her funeral was held in the Cathedral Basilica of Saints Peter and Paul in Philadelphia, at which Archbishop Prendergast gave the final absolution.

== Selected works ==
- Out of Sweet Solitude (1873)
- Domus Dei (1875)
- Hymns of the Sacred Heart (1882)
- A Memoir of Father Felix Joseph Barbelin, S. J (1886)
- Little Compliments of the Season, and Other Tiny Rhymes for Tiny Readers (1887)
- Poems (1892)
- Hymns of the Sacred Heart No. 2 (1893)
- The Lost Christmas Tree, and Other Little Stories and Verses for Children (1896)
- Petronilla, and Other Stories (1896)
- A Tuscan Magdalen, and Other Legends and Poems (1896)
- Amy’s Music Box, and Other Little Stories and Verses for Children (1896)
- The Fatal Diamonds (1897)
- Prince Ragnal, and Other Holiday Verse (1898)
- Storm-bound; a Romance of Shell Beach (c. 1898)
- A Klondike Picnic; the Story of a Day (1898)
- The Rhyme of the Friar Stephen: a Legend (1898)
- Christian Carols of Love and Life (1898)
- Lot Leslie’s Folks and Their Queer Adventures Among the French and Indians (1899)
- Life of Sister Mary Gonzaga Grace, of the Daughters of Charity of St. Vincent de Paul, 1812-1897 (1900)
- Miss Varney’s Experience: and Other Stories (1901)
- The Secret of the Statue, and Other Verse (1907)
