= Colonial Club =

Eating club at Princeton University

- U.S. Historic district – Contributing property
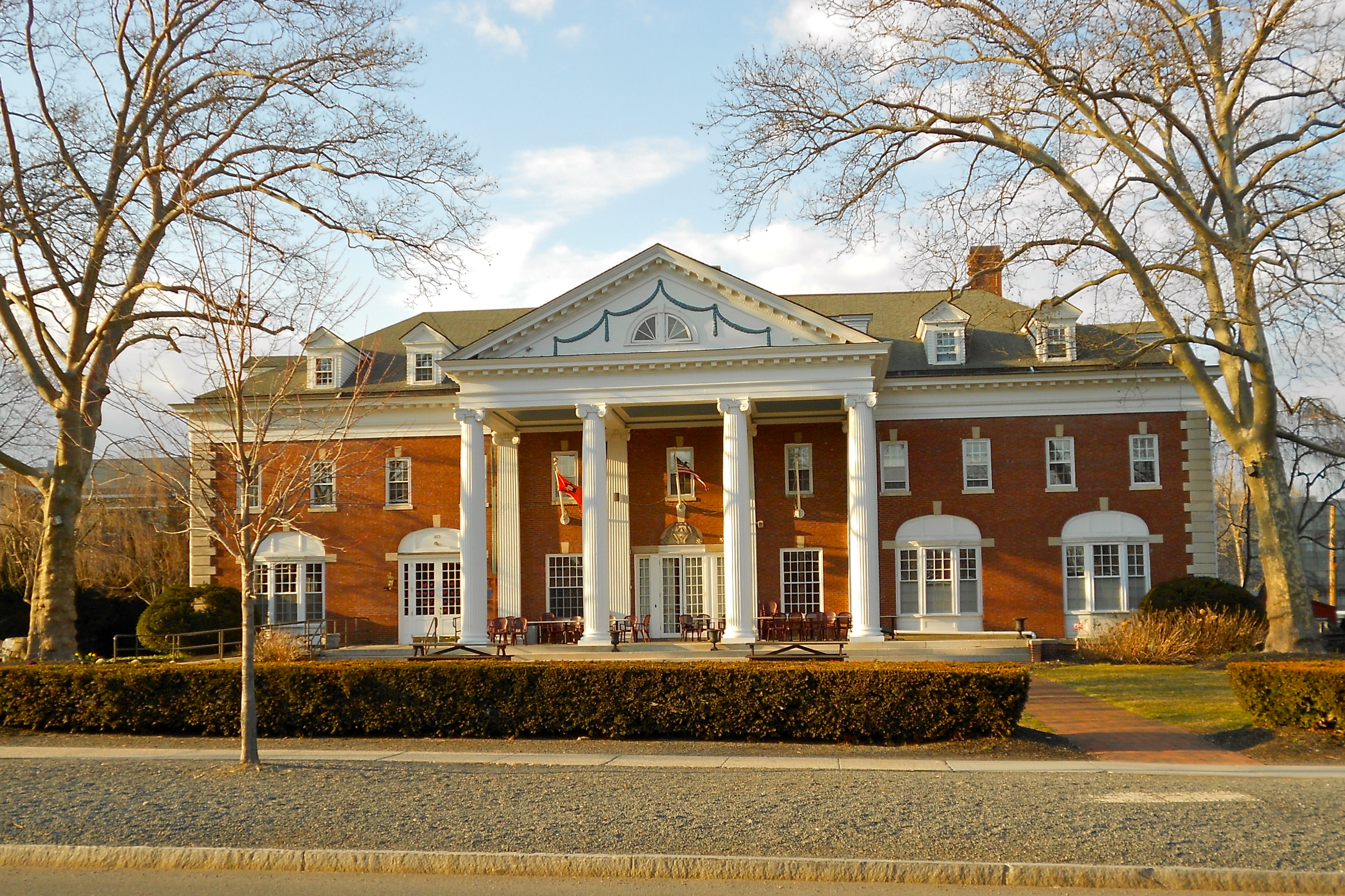

- Location within Mercer County, New Jersey Location within New Jersey Location within the United States
- Location: 40 Prospect Ave, Princeton, New Jersey
- Coordinates: 40°20′55.8″N 74°39′10.1″W
- Built: 1906
- Architect: Robert W. Gibson and Francis G. Stewart
- Architectural style: Colonial revival
- Part of: Princeton Historic District (ID75001143)
- Added to NRHP: 27 June 1975

Colonial Club is one of the eleven current eating clubs of Princeton University in Princeton, New Jersey, United States. Founded in 1891, it is the fifth oldest of the clubs. It is located on 40 Prospect Avenue.

A private social club for undergraduates at Princeton University, the club was referred to as "flamboyant Colonial" in F. Scott Fitzgerald's debut novel, This Side of Paradise, and was defined as being one of the "top five" clubs along with Ivy, Cottage, Cap & Gown, and Tiger Inn. Colonial Club has been heralded for its progressive legacy.

Colonial Club has been affiliated with seven Rhodes Scholars and several valedictorians of Princeton University. Among the Princetonians who were involved in the World War II code-breaking at Bletchley Park, some were allegedly from Colonial Club.

The club has served as the primary social scene for several notable alumni during their undergraduate years, including former Colonial Club Vice President Joseph Nye '58, co-founder of the international relations theory of neoliberalism, Pete Conrad '53, third man to walk on the Moon, Eric Schmidt '76, executive chairman of Alphabet Inc. and former CEO of Google, and Ted Cruz '92, U.S. Senator and candidate for the Republican nomination for President of the United States in the 2016 election.

== Clubhouse ==
The club occupies a large mansion on the north side of Prospect Avenue in Princeton, NJ. The building is easily recognizable by its four large white columns fashioned in Colonial style. The current building has served as the clubhouse for Colonial since 1906. After originally occupying several locations farther away from campus, the current house was built during a time of strong rivalry between eating clubs, across the street from rival clubs Ivy and Cottage.

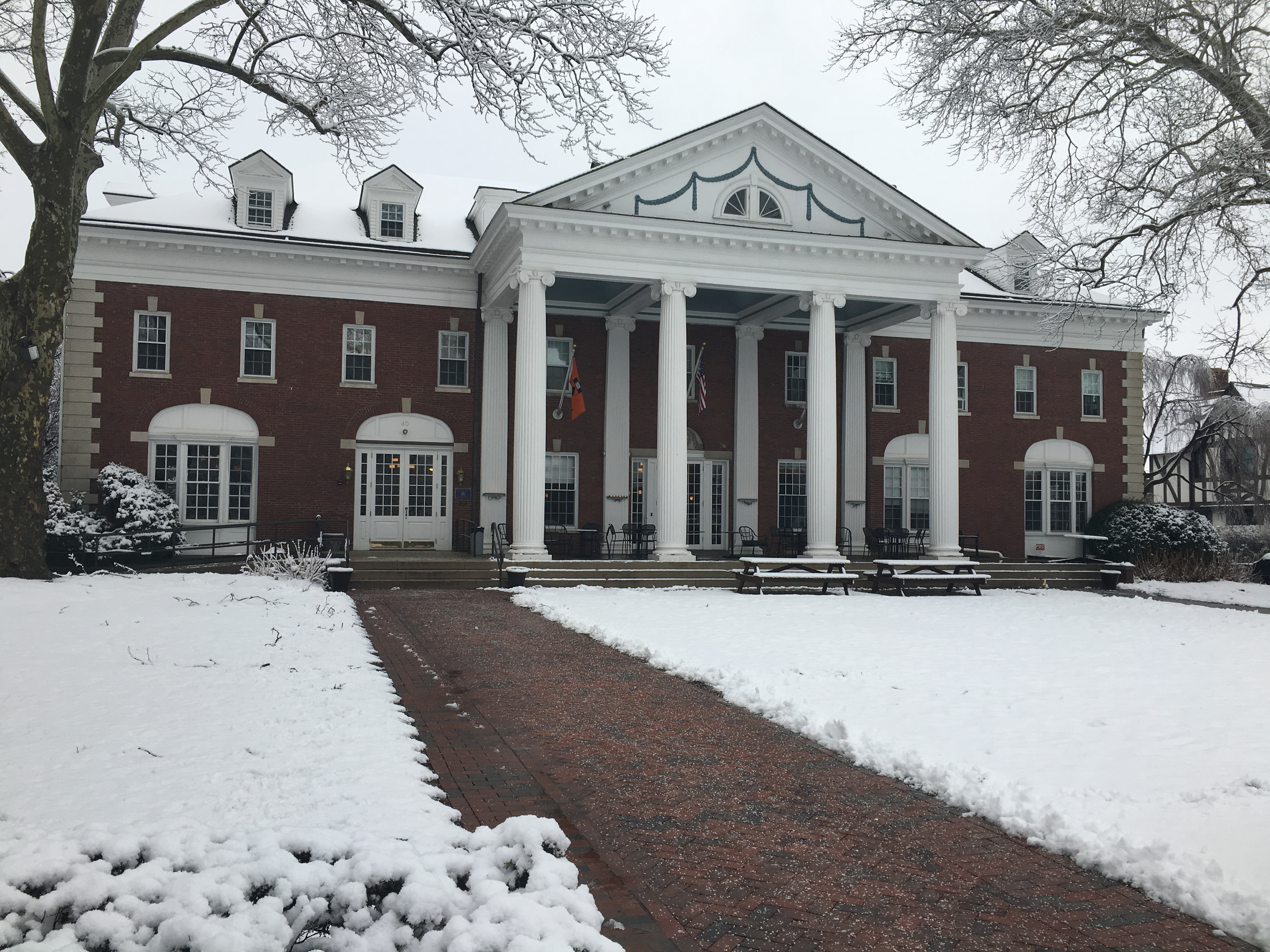
Colonial club in the winter

Colonial's first clubhouse was located on 306 Nassau Street and served as the club's residence for only one year. In 1892, the club moved to a house on 186 Nassau Street fashioned in the period's cottage architecture, featuring a front facade in the Queen Anne style. The club subsequently moved to Prospect Avenue in 1897, taking over the old Ivy Club house and changing the exterior by adding decorative columns and enlarging the lower floor. This third clubhouse lasted 9 years until the current clubhouse was built, funded by the issuance of bonds to graduate members and alumni. The new clubhouse was designed by associated architects Robert W. Gibson and Francis G. Stewart of New York City.

The current clubhouse features a wide variety of facilities, including a large foyer, cloak room, dining hall, kitchen, library, home theatre, game and billiards room, taproom, computer cluster, offices, various study rooms, and over a dozen bedrooms. The club's undergraduate officers reside in the mansion's third floor.

== History ==
=== Early history ===
==== Foundation ====
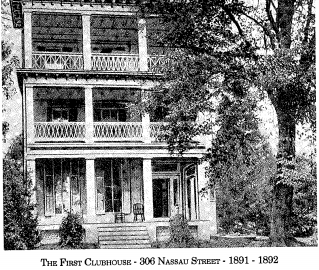
Colonial Club's first clubhouse, 1891–1892.

Founded in 1891 under the presidency of H.P. 'Bert' Fisher '93, the club was formed by a group of 13 Princeton University juniors, who originally called themselves the "Plug and Ulster Club." The club's founders initially encountered opposition by the president of the college, Reverend Francis L. Patton, who opposed to the establishment of a boy's club adjacent to Evelyn College, Princeton's coordinate women's college. After agreeing to several provisions, Colonial Club was founded and situated itself in an old Virginian, three-story veranda house. The original section consisted of several notable students including Booth Tarkington, founder of the Princeton Triangle Club. The club later was formerly incorporated in 1896 as The Colonial Club of Princeton University.

==== Great War Era ====
After the sinking of the Lusitania, military training became the principal activity on campus. Only a few of the eating clubs remained open during this time. Colonial Club temporarily considered combining with Tiger Inn until the full membership of the various clubs returned to college after the war. Almost the entire 1917 section left college to enter various branches of service, and the entirety of the 1919 section was drafted, leading to the closing of the club. Several club members perished during World War I, including John G. Agar Jr. '14, Joseph M. Duff Jr. '12, Gordon C. Gregory '18, and Samuel F. Pogue '04. Colonial Club's 1920 section managed to revive the club after the war, under the guidance of W. Irving Harris '20 and Harvey S. Firestone Jr. '20, who later was chairman of the board of the Firestone Tire and Rubber Company.

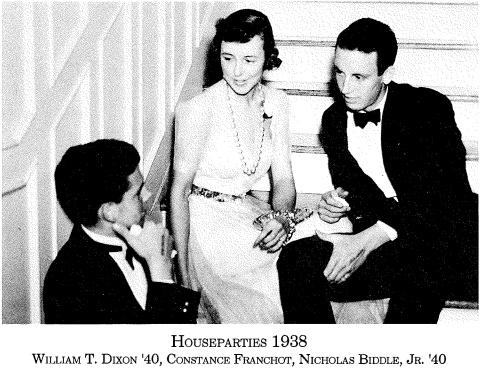
Colonial Club Houseparties, 1938

==== Great Depression and WWII ====
Surprisingly, Colonial Club enjoyed its biggest years in the thirties. The original 1933 section of thirty men was the largest that had ever entered the club up to that time, most of whom were students in the university's Politics Department. According to the Colonial Club 100th Anniversary Book, the most striking feature of the club proved to be the members' "bland unawareness of the significance of outside events in those days...few believed that the invasion of Manchuria or Hitler's rise to power carried a personal threat to us."

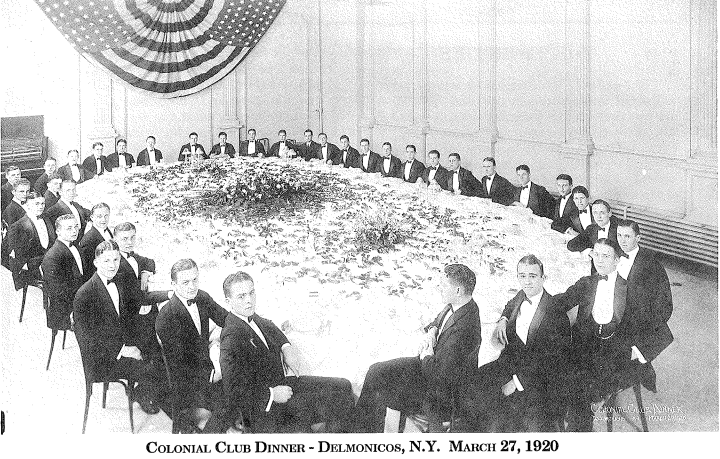
Colonial Club Dinner, Delmonicos, N.Y., March 27, 1920

Colonial Club's tradition of having its formal club dinners in New York began in 1934 in an effort to bring together graduate and undergraduate members. The tradition has continued into the 21st century, with member and alumni dinners commonly held at the Princeton Club of New York.

In the 1940s, Colonial Club continued to hold its place as one of the "Big Five" socially prominent eating clubs, along with Ivy, Cottage, Cap & Gown, and Tiger Inn. At the time, 80% of the members came from private preparatory schools, largely in New York, Philadelphia, and Boston, with the primary campus activity being Triangle Club and crew. Membership dropped during World War II, with 18 members ranging from the 1914 section to the 1941 section perishing in the conflict.

==== Cold War era ====
After the world war, however, Colonial's extravagant style and activities returned to the club's normal affairs. Nearly $15,000 (around $150,000 in 2016) was once spent to hire Lester Lanin's Orchestra, and parties reminiscent of those in the Roaring Twenties became a staple of club life. By the end of the 50s, many of the traditional social amenities of earlier eras began to fade; buffet style became fashionable in lieu of the club's traditional white tablecloths, linen napkins, and waiters.

In the 60s, the club experienced several changes. The clubhouse's third floor bedrooms, which long held the staff of waiters, were renovated into rooms for members. Variable section sizes and a drop in alumni financial support occasionally led to tough financial situations for the club.

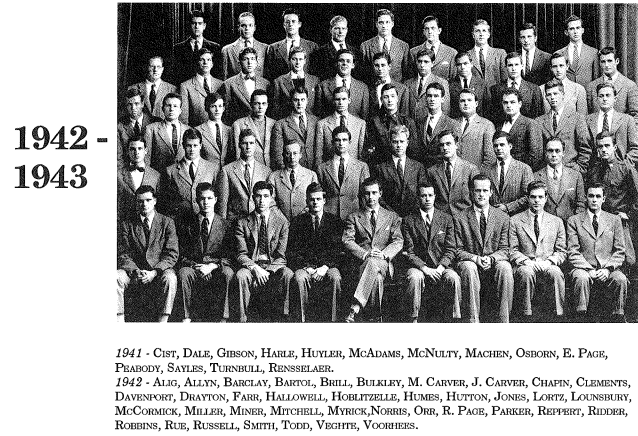
Colonial Club Members during the height of World War II

During this time, Colonial became the first of the clubs to go non-selective, in 1969. This move, strongly encouraged by university officials, coincided with the club's admittance of female members. Unlike some of the other eating clubs including Ivy Club, which did not allow women until a lawsuit in 1991, Colonial permitted women to join once Princeton University began to admit women as undergraduates in the same year. The inclusion of women in the club's daily life noticeably led to more small parties and events around the clubhouse.

The club's financial difficulties gradually continued into the 70s and 80s, during which the club's Graduate Board of Governors considered closing the club. Efforts by several of the undergraduate officers, including president Jaime Isbester and vice president April Gilbert, kept the club afloat via a fundraising campaign that raised more than $650,000 (over $2 million in 2016). Graduate members including Jack Dorrance '41, then chairman of the Campbell's, single-handedly donated over $100,000 in the club's Centennial Campaign.

=== Modern history ===
==== 2000s ====
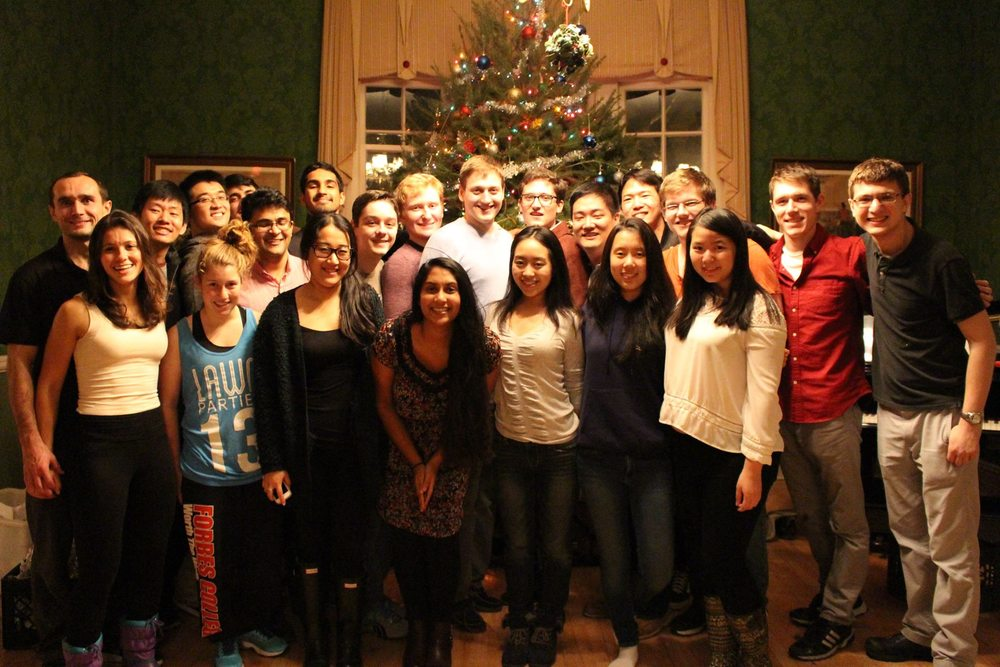
Colonial Club Christmas Celebration, 2015

Interest in the club reached a low point in 1999 when only 26 members of the class of 2001 signed into Colonial. Aggressive event planning by the classes of 2000 and 2001, along with generous alumni support and an enthusiastic and dedicated class of 2002, brought the club back from the brink. This was at least the third time the club had been rescued from near-oblivion; 1982 and 1988 also had seen very low sign-in numbers. In 2010, however, Colonial managed to recruit only 13 members in the first round of sign-ins; this was a massive drop from the 87 first round sign-ins from the previous year. The club was still able to attract a substantial number of new members during the second round of sign-ins that same year. In 2011, a huge turnaround occurred when over 130 sophomores signed into the club, which was the largest number of sophomores to join any of the eating clubs.

Throughout this period, the club has seen both the size and demographics of each section shift drastically. Nonetheless, the openness of the club, as demonstrated in 1969, remained a hallmark of the club's culture and shaped the club into the next decade.

== Club culture ==
=== Activities and traditions ===
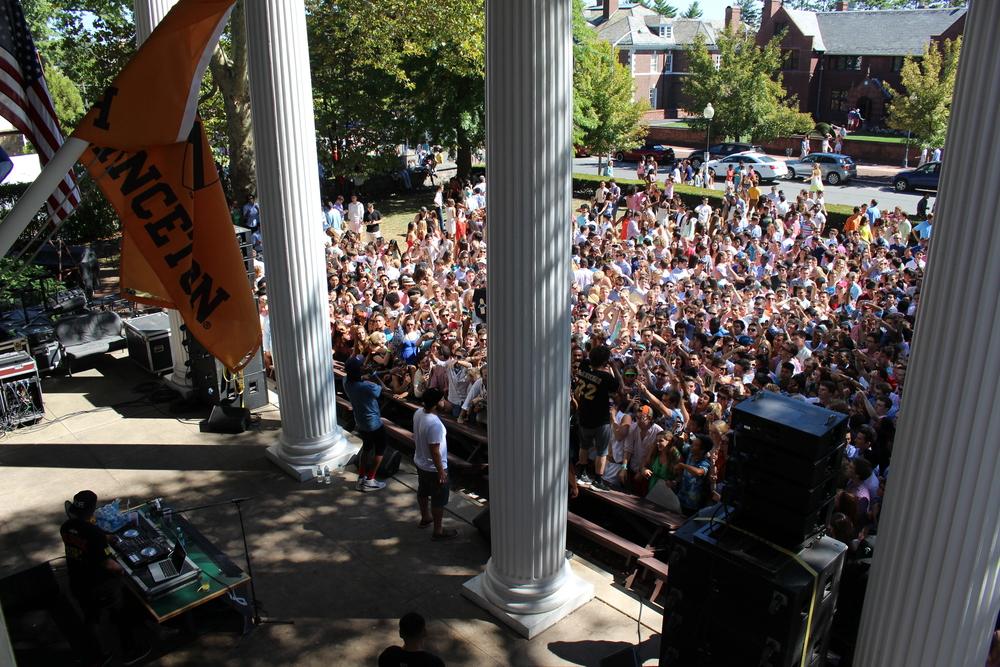
Lawnparties at Colonial Club, 2015, featuring Lil Dicky

Continuing its established traditions originating from the Roaring Twenties, Colonial frequently hosts events for its members and guests including game nights, intramural sports, semiformals, and winter and spring house parties. The club also participates in events such as trivia night, club field days, bonfires, outdoor BBQs, and therapy dog study breaks.

As with other the eating clubs, Colonial has participated in the university's annual Lawnparties music festival, hosting artists such as Between Friends, Crash Adams, and Weston Estate in recent years. Traditions at Colonial include its annual medieval feast and thesis phrase, where members attempt to insert a humorous line into their Princeton University senior thesis.

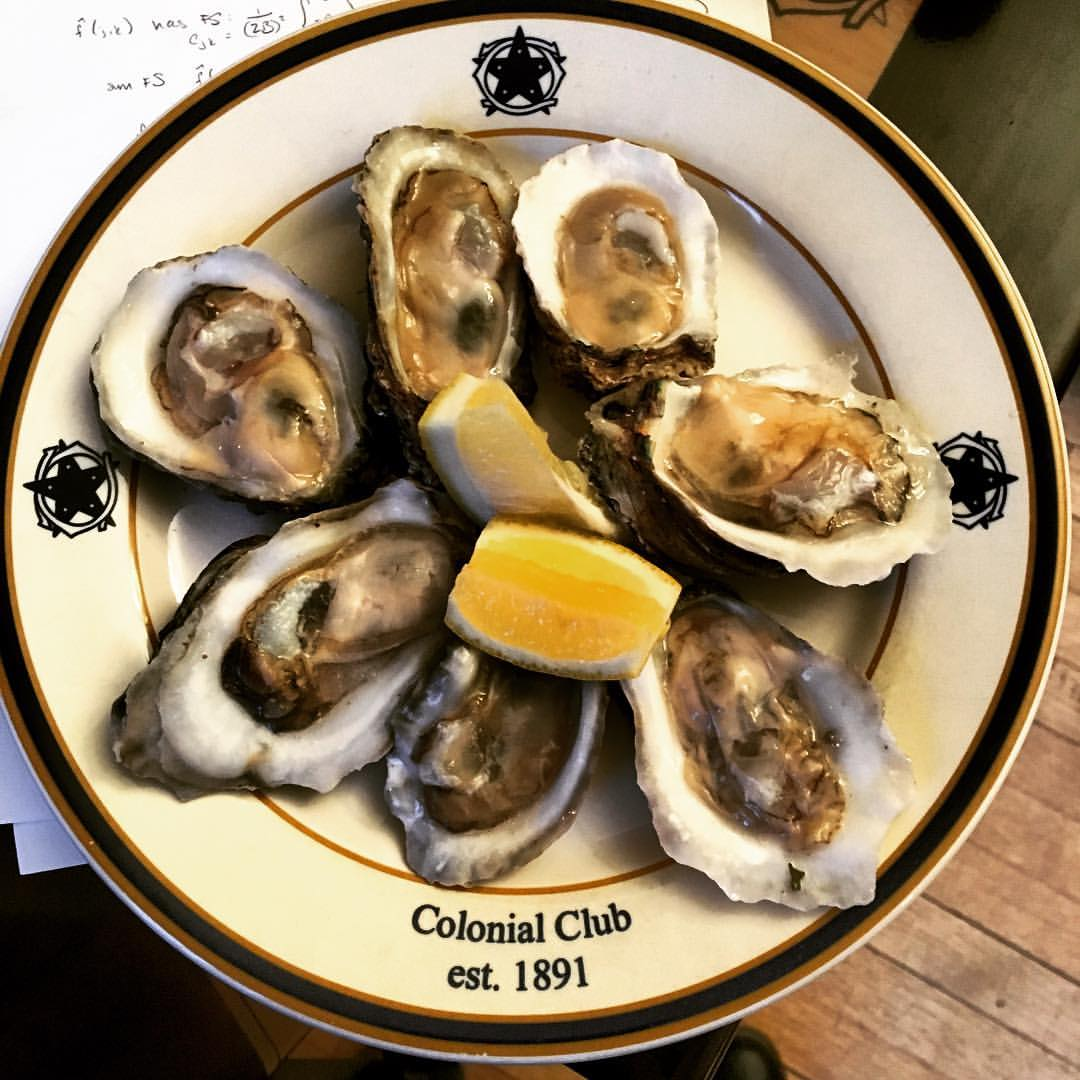
Fresh oysters prepared by Chef Ramirez at Colonial Club

Colonial's large, white columns are often seen illuminated by lights on Friday nights, when the club is open to students of Princeton University and other members of the Princeton community.

As an eating club, Colonial members often have breakfast, lunch, and dinner at the clubhouse daily, with brunch served on the weekends. The club's buffet-style meals often feature an open grill, smoothie station, and panini bar. Other popular options include the club's fresh oysters, BBQ ribs, udon, fish tacos, Korean short ribs, and pork buns. In the 1960s, Colonial was the second of the eating clubs to offer a vegetarian contract, which was slightly cheaper than the regular meal plan offered to members.

=== Academics and community service ===
Colonial has been committed to maintaining a rigorous scholarly community and providing professional opportunities to its members. The club's Professor Dinner Series allows members and guests to debate and discuss various topics with university professors, who are invited weekly to the club to discuss their research or engage in conversation. Furthermore, the club manages a student-run portfolio of over $100,000 in assets under management (AUM) and hosts its own in-house software development team.

Colonial Club has enjoyed a long-standing partnership with the Princeton-Blairstown Center, a program founded in 1908 by Princeton University students and faculty that attempts to transform the lives of young people through character-building experiences. The club holds an annual charity talent show in order to raise money for a variety of nonprofit organizations including HomeFront NJ. In addition, Colonial Club is noted for its enthusiasm towards influenza vaccines, leading all Princeton eating clubs in flu shots for H1N1, H5N1, and every major flu strain seen since 1975. This was sparked by Colonial's loss of 90% of its members to the 1918 flu pandemic.

=== Management ===
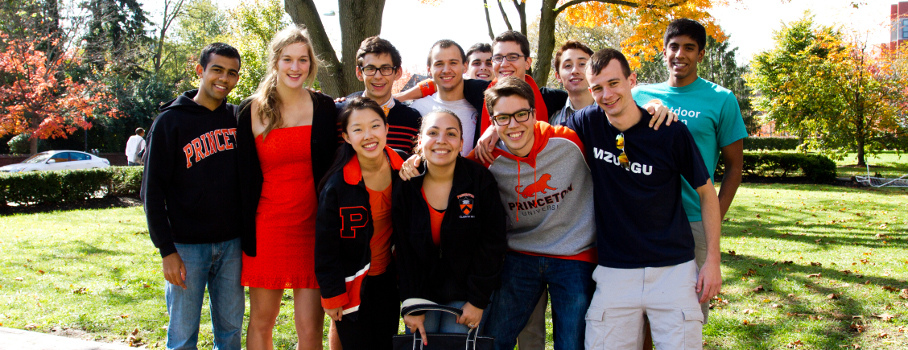
Colonial Club Undergraduate Officers, 2012

As with the past century, Colonial Club is managed by the Graduate Board of Governors, composed of graduate members of the club, and the Undergraduate Officers, who are elected each December. Colonial Club's executive chef, Gilberto Ramirez, has been in post for over 11 years. Ramirez graduated from the French Culinary Institute and previously worked at TPC Jasna Polana. The club is also directed by a club manager, Kathleen Galante, who oversees day-to-day affairs.

Colonial Club celebrated its 125th anniversary under graduate president Joseph Studholme '84, who has led the board since 2009, and undergraduate president Christopher J. Yu '17. Continuing its 1934 tradition of having formal member-alumni dinners, the club held its 125th Anniversary Celebration with a cruise dinner aboard the yacht Atlantica in New York Harbor.

== Notable alumni ==
Notable alumni of Colonial Club include:

- Pete Conrad '53, a NASA astronaut who commanded Apollo 12 and became the third person to walk on the Moon. Conrad carried five Princeton flags on the mission. One of the flags currently resides in the club manager's office.
- Claiborne Pell '40, a United States senator from Rhode Island who was largely responsible for establishing the federal student-aid program later renamed the Pell Grant.
- Harvey S. Firestone Jr. '20, a businessman who led the Firestone Tire and Rubber Company and expanded its international operations. A Princeton trustee, Firestone organized the family gift that funded the Harvey S. Firestone Memorial Library, which was named in memory of his father, company founder Harvey S. Firestone. He also helped revive Colonial Club following World War I.
- Eric Schmidt '76, the former CEO of Google.
- John C. Beck '53, an investment manager and Princeton trustee who helped establish the Princeton University Investment Company (PRINCO), which manages the university's endowment. Beck was vice president of Colonial.
- Jeff Smisek '76, the former chairman and chief executive officer of United Continental Holdings.
- Pete Muller '85, a quantitative investor, singer-songwriter, and founder of the investment firm PDT Partners.
- Ted Cruz '92, a United States senator from Texas and a candidate for the Republican presidential nomination in 2016.
- John T. Dorrance Jr. '41, a former chairman of the Campbell's.
- Edward F. Cox '68, an attorney and political figure who is the son-in-law of President Richard Nixon.
- Céline Gounder '97, an infectious-disease physician and medical journalist. Gounder met her future husband, fellow Colonial member Grant Wahl, at the club.
- Anne Holton '80, an attorney and former Virginia secretary of education.
- Wentworth Miller '95, an actor and screenwriter best known for starring in the television series Prison Break.
- Joseph Nye '58, a political scientist who coined the term "soft power" and served as dean of the Harvard Kennedy School. Nye was vice president of Colonial while at Princeton.
- Leonard D. Schaeffer '69, a health-care executive and former chairman and chief executive officer of WellPoint. Schaeffer was president of Colonial during his senior year.
- Fred Mustard Stewart '54, a bestselling novelist whose works included The Mephisto Waltz, Six Weeks, Century, and Ellis Island. Stewart chaired Colonial's social committee.
- Booth Tarkington, a novelist and member of the group that founded Colonial Club, received the Pulitzer Prize for the Novel for The Magnificent Ambersons and Alice Adams.
- Norman Thomas 1905, a socialist leader who was the Socialist Party of America nominee for president six times between 1928 and 1948.
- Grant Wahl '96, a soccer journalist who worked for Sports Illustrated, CBS Sports, and Fox Sports and authored The Beckham Experiment and Masters of Modern Soccer.
- William B. Pell 1898, an illustrator whose work appeared in Princeton publications.
- Henry Wendt III '55, the former chairman and chief executive officer of Smith Kline & French, a predecessor of GlaxoSmithKline.

== Historic photographs ==
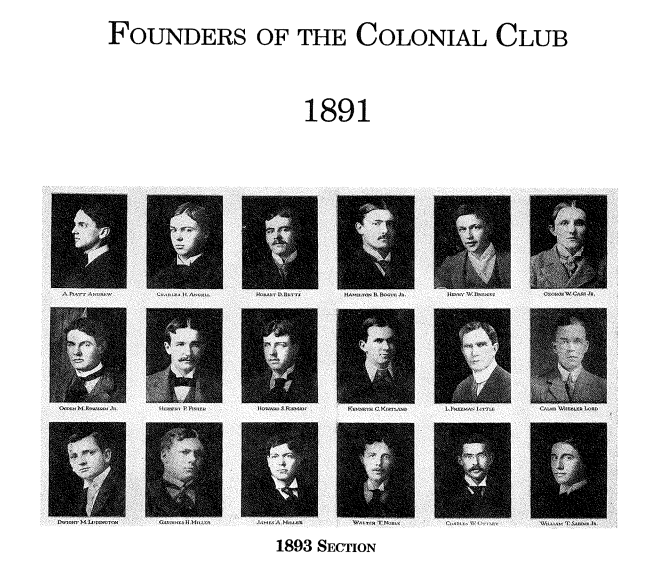
Founders of Colonial Club, 1891

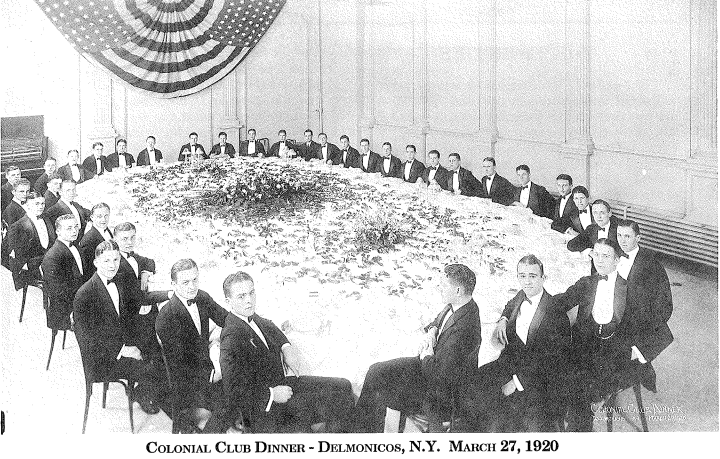
Colonial Club Dinner- Delmonicos, N.Y., March 27, 1920

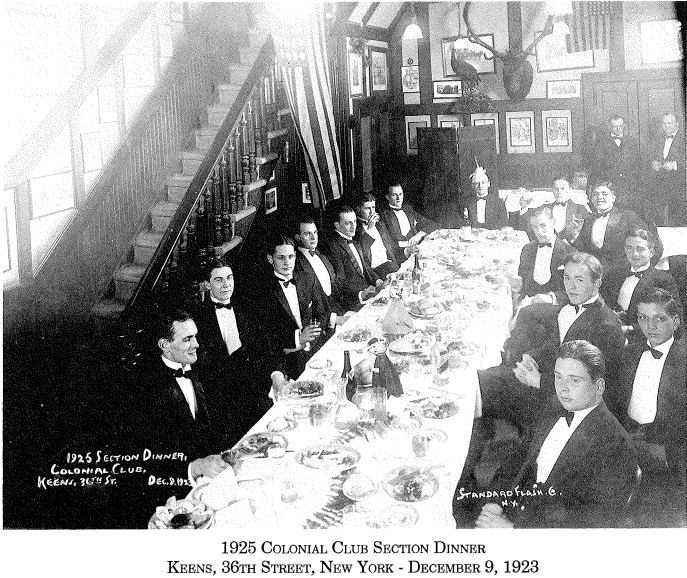
1925 Colonial Club Section Dinner

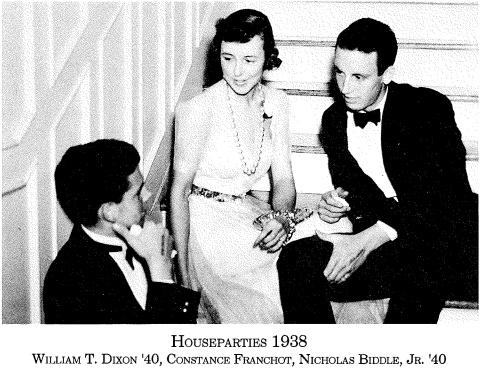
Houseparties at Colonial Club, 1938

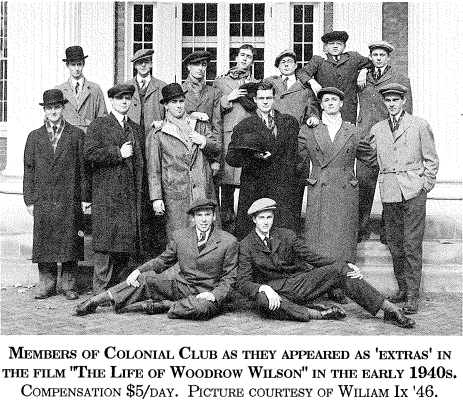
Members of Colonial Club as 'extras' in the film "The Life of Woodrow Wilson" in the early 1940s

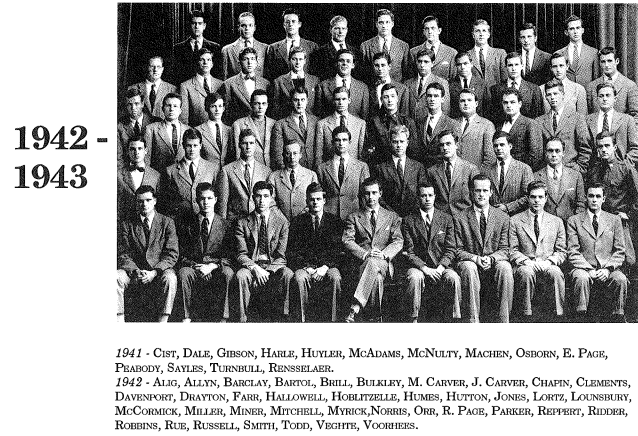
Colonial Club Members during the height of WWII. Several members perished during the war.

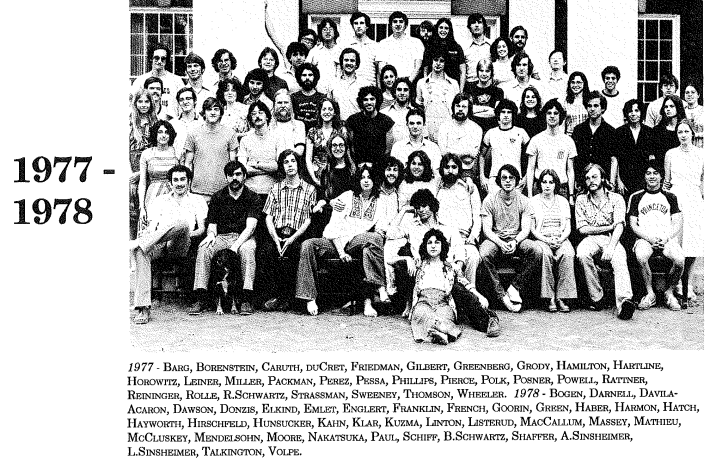
Colonial Club members in 1978, nearly 10 years after allowing women to join

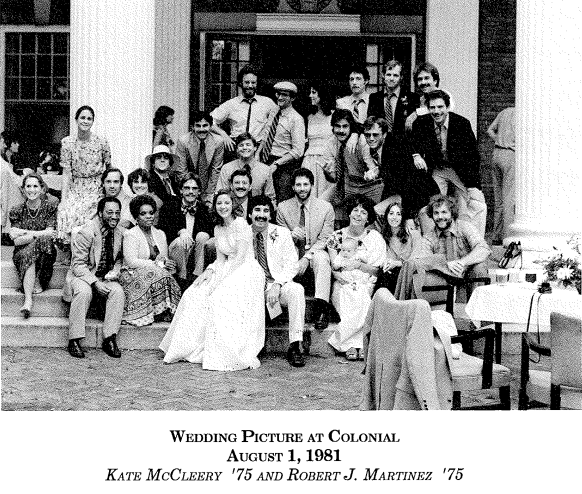
Wedding Picture at Colonial, August 1, 1981

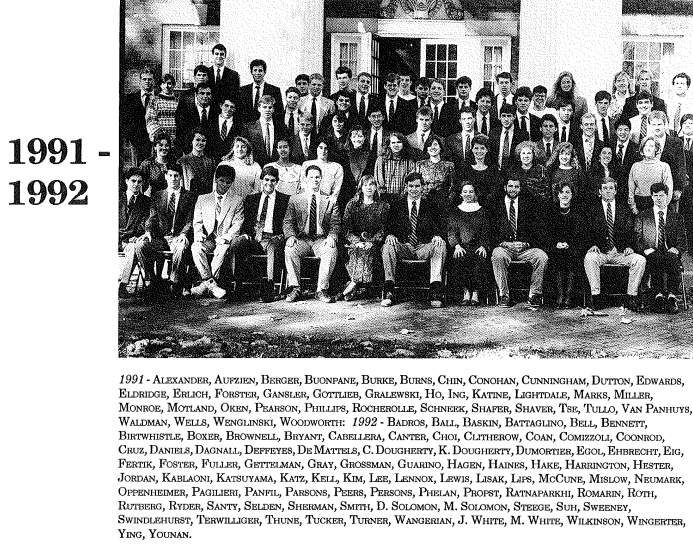
Colonial Club members in 1992, featuring Rafael 'Ted' Cruz

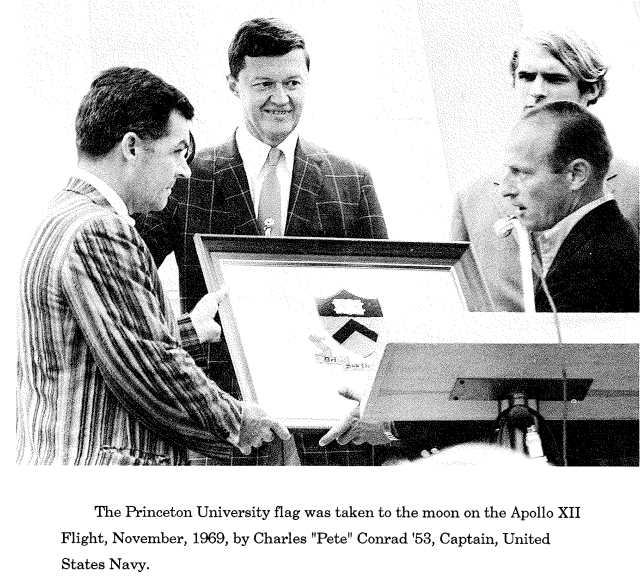
Colonial Club Member, Charles "Pete" Conrad '53, presents Princeton University flag taken to the moon on Apollo Flight XII to Colonial Club

== See also ==
- Cannon Club
- Cap and Gown Club
- Cloister Inn
- Ivy Club
- Princeton Charter Club
- Terrace Club
- Tiger Inn
- Tower Club
- University Cottage Club
- Quadrangle Club
