= Terrace Club =

Eating club at Princeton University

- Terrace F. Club
- U.S. Historic district – Contributing property
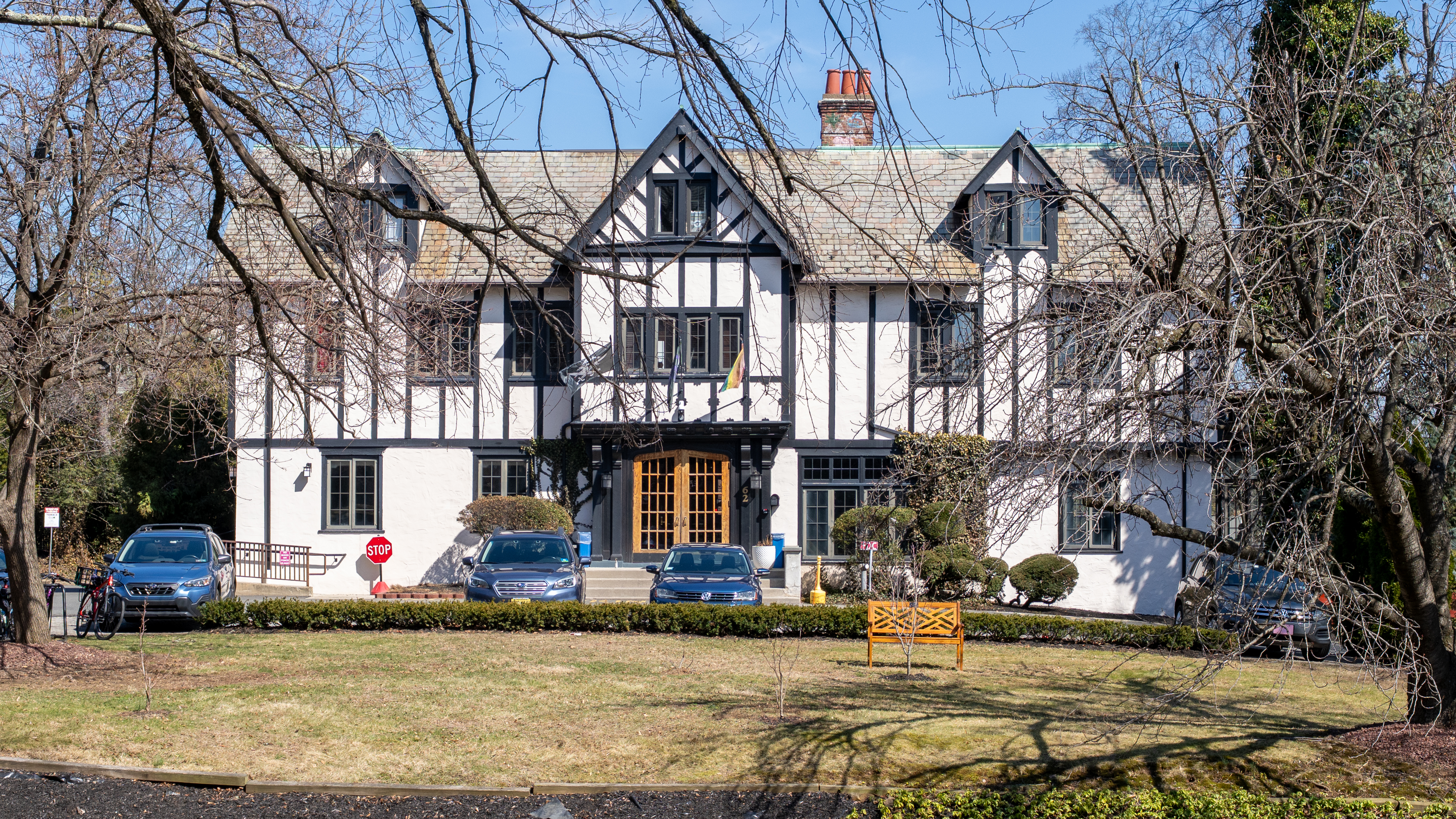

- Location within Mercer County, New Jersey Location within New Jersey Location within the United States
- Location: 62 Washington Road, Princeton, New Jersey
- Coordinates: 40°20′49.8″N 74°39′14.3″W
- Built: 1920 (on a pre-existing building)
- Architect: Frederick Stone and Rolf Bauhan
- Architectural style: Tudor Revival
- Part of: Princeton Historic District (ID75001143)
- Added to NRHP: 27 June 1975

Princeton Terrace Club is one of eleven current eating clubs at Princeton University in Princeton, New Jersey, United States. Terrace Club was founded in 1904 and is located at 62 Washington Road. It is the sole remaining Princeton eating club located off Prospect Avenue.

== Membership and culture ==
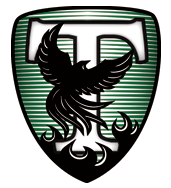
Terrace Club Seal

In 1967, Terrace became the first eating club to switch to a nonselective lottery "sign-in" system for membership, as opposed to the selective bicker system. Terrace was soon followed by Campus, Colonial, and Cloister. Today five of the 11 remaining operating clubs do not use the bicker system. Terrace was one of the earliest clubs to accept Jewish, African-American, and female members, and today is considered on campus to be the most "alternative," politically liberal eating club. Since 2000, Terrace has been a popular choice for sophomores, filling all of its membership slots either during first round sign-in or by the end of the second round.

Terrace's motto has been "Food = Love" since the mid-eighties. The food is served cafeteria-style and is famous for being more vegetarian-friendly than other clubs. Members of Terrace often refer to the club as "Terrace F. Club" or "TFC". Other nicknames include "the mother," "mother Terrace," or "the womb," and members often refer to themselves as "Terrans".

Weekend events at Terrace often include concerts of indie-scene bands from a variety of genres, including rock, hip-hop, salsa, jazz, and electronica. Many notable artists and groups, including former club member Stanley Jordan, Flipper, Phil Lesh, Yo La Tengo, Gwar, Blues Traveler (Summer '87), ESG, Bim Skala Bim, Elliott Smith, Run DMC, Modest Mouse, The Flaming Lips, Vampire Weekend, Frightened Rabbit, Girl Talk, GZA, Immortal Technique, Stereolab, Snarky Puppy, Action Bronson, Vulfpeck, and Tortoise have played at Terrace, some before they were nationally known. Terrace also hosts the Queer Radicals' Annual Drag Ball in October or November.

== History ==
Original Terrace Club Seal

As was then common practice for newly founded eating clubs, when Terrace Club began in 1904, the members dined in a building on Olden Street known as "The Incubator." This small structure had previously been the original home of Cap & Gown, and had been relocated to Olden Street from Cap and Gown's current location. It served as a temporary home for many eating clubs while their own buildings were under construction or being renovated.

In 1906, the club relocated to the current Washington Road location, which was occupied by a house in the Colonial Revival style which had formerly belonged to faculty member John Grier Hibben. This building was remodeled by architect Frederick Stone in the 1920s to the current configuration with its Tudor-style exterior.

A tea party at Terrace in 1936 is credited as the birthplace of the idea for the short-lived Veterans of Future Wars, an organization that satirized the acceleration of bonus payments to World War I veterans by demanding that its young members be similarly paid for the services they would render their country in conflicts to come.

In 1967, Terrace became the first club to abandon the bicker process. Terrace Club and Colonial Club were the first clubs to accept women following the University's decision to admit women in 1969. In 2011, Terrace became the first club to offer membership to graduate students.

From 1977 until 1984, many of the sign-in clubs faltered due to declining membership numbers, and the Graduate Board seriously considered closing Terrace in 1983. As an attempt to attract new members, chef Larry Frazer began cooking vegetarian meals, a new concept on campus at the time. Frazer was married in Terrace Club in 1982 with the officers acting as attendants and guitarist Stanley Jordan as the musical performer. Frazer later moved on to become chef at Campus Club at the short-lived DEC, and served as the Executive Catering Chef for the University itself.

Much of the reputation Terrace enjoys today grew with the leadership and love of the late Barton R. Rouse, the force behind Terrace's parties and food. Frazer had hired Rouse originally to serve as sous chef in 1984 and Rouse later succeeded Frazer as head chef for the club. Rouse was the originator of the club's "Food=Love" motto and brought a flair to his job, including the creation of themed meals and parties, which soon became a hallmark of the club. Rouse served in this role until his death in 1994.

== Notable alumni ==
- Harold Medina '09 - Lawyer and judge notable for hearing landmark cases of conspiracy and treason
- William H. Scheide '36 - Musician, philanthropist, and humanitarian. Relocated the Scheide Library, "probably the finest private library in existence in the world," to Princeton's Firestone Library. A primary funder of Brown vs. Board of Education.
- Mel Ferrer '39 - Actor, film director and producer
- Russell E. Train '41 - President of World Wildlife Fund, 1978-1985
- Warren Eginton '45 - Senior U.S. District judge for District of Connecticut
- Galway Kinnell '48 - Poet, translator, and author
- Jacques-André Istel '49 - Parachutist and "father of modern skydiving"
- Richard Riordan '52 - Former mayor of Los Angeles
- Alan Blinder '67 - Former Vice Chairman of the U.S. Federal Reserve and professor of economics and public affairs at Princeton University
- Madison Smartt Bell '79 - Novelist
- Ken McCarthy '81 - Internet commercialization pioneer, author, educator (Terrace Social Director)
- Stanley Jordan '81 - Jazz guitarist
- Dana L. Harrison '81 - Finance then core organizer of Burning Man festival. Worked with numerous spiritual and creative organizations around the Bay Area. ( Terrace President )
- Douglas Rushkoff '83 - Author and media theorist
- Walter Kirn '83 - Novelist and Literary Critic
- Howard Gordon '84 - TV writer, producer, and showrunner
- Jonathan Ames '86/'87 - Writer, raconteur and performance artist, creator of HBO's Bored to Death
- Kate Betts '86 - American fashion journalist - senior editor at American Vogue, editor of Harper's Bazaar
- Nils Muižnieks '86 - Human rights activist and political scientist, Council of Europe Commissioner for Human Rights since 2012
- Todd Wider '86 - Plastic surgeon and Emmy Award-winning film producer
- Jack Weiss '86 - Former Los Angeles City Council member
- Sina Najafi '86/'87 - founder and editor-in-chief of New York-based Cabinet Magazine
- Jennifer S. Hirsch '88 - Researcher, professor at Columbia University, social justice advocate, and author
- Ron Norsworthy '88 - Visual artist, product and production designer (TV Shows, Specials & Music Videos)
- Sophia Rosenfeld '88 - Historian, professor, and author
- E. Randol Schoenberg '88 - U.S. attorney, based in Los Angeles, California. Successful case in Supreme Court of the United States Republic of Austria v. Altmann in 2004. President of the Los Angeles Museum of the Holocaust.
- Theodore Zoli '88 - American structural engineer, and a leading designer of cable-stayed bridges. 2009 MacArthur Fellows Program
- Vanessa Friedman '89 - Fashion director and chief fashion critic at The New York Times.
- Clifford J. Levy '89 - Two-time winner of the Pulitzer Prize, in 2003 and 2011, for The New York Times,
- Josh Marshall '91 - American Polk Award-winning journalist and blogger who founded Talking Points Memo
- Mark Feuerstein '93 - Actor
- Mohsin Hamid '93 - Author known for Moth Smoke, The Reluctant Fundamentalist, and Exit West
- Peter Moskos '94 - Author
- William Berlind '95 - Theater producer
- Jordan Roth '97 - President and majority owner of Jujamcyn Theaters
- Tim Ferriss '00 - Entrepreneur, investor, and author
- Jonathan Safran Foer '00 - Author
- Julia Ioffe '05 - Journalist who covers national security and foreign policy topics
- Branden Jacobs-Jenkins '06 - Tony Award and Pulitzer Award-winning playwright
