= Princeton Charter Club =

Eating club at Princeton University

- U.S. Historic district – Contributing property
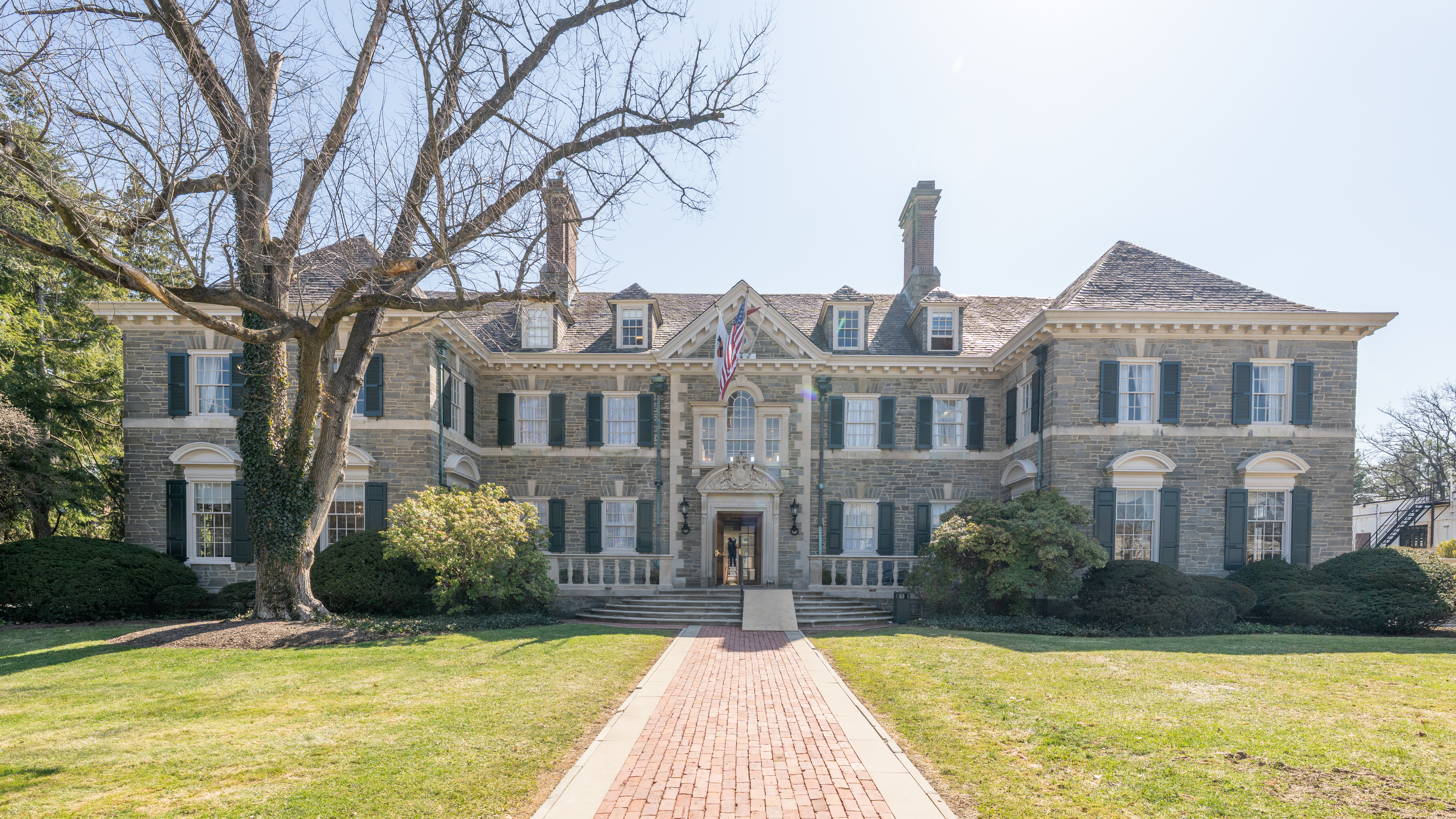

- Location within Mercer County, New Jersey Location within New Jersey Location within the United States
- Location: 79 Prospect Ave, Princeton, New Jersey
- Coordinates: 40°20′55.6″N 74°39′00.2″W
- Built: 1914
- Architect: Arthur Ingersoll Meigs
- Architectural style: Georgian and Colonial Revival
- Part of: Princeton Historic District (ID75001143)
- Added to NRHP: 27 June 1975

The Princeton Charter Club is one of Princeton University's eleven active undergraduate eating clubs located on or near Prospect Avenue in Princeton, New Jersey, United States.

== Club history ==
The Princeton Charter Club was organized in the fall of 1901 as Princeton's ninth eating club, with a Senior Section from the Class of 1902 and a Junior Section from the Class of 1903. The name Cloister was at first selected until it was discovered that Yale already had an institution of similar name. About that time the document known as the Charter for the College of New Jersey was found and presented to the university. Charter's current neighbor to the west, Cloister Inn, later took the discarded name.

A small building on Olden Street—known as the "Incubator" because several other clubs had started there while they waited for sufficient finances to buy or build a proper clubhouse—was leased and the furnishing paid for by subscriptions.

In the spring of 1903 the club purchased three lots and a house on Prospect Avenue which constitutes three-quarters of the present property. The house was redesigned and enlarged under the supervision of an undergraduate member David Adler of the 1904 Section, with the assistance of Professor Harris of the faculty. The funds for the purchase of this property and the alterations to this second clubhouse were raised by the sale of nineteen $1,000 mortgage bonds.

The "Adler Clubhouse" would house Charter Club for a decade, until the present "Third Clubhouse", designed by architectural firm Mellor & Meigs was completed in the fall of 1914. Additionally, Charter's real estate assets had grown. In early 1905, at least one adjacent lot was purchased. In the summer of 1905, a squash court was built behind the clubhouse. The expansion of the land holdings encouraged the membership and graduate section of Charter to build the Third Clubhouse, which was and is a far more imposing edifice than either the Adler Clubhouse or even the "Incubator". Today, Charter is widely regarded as having one of the finest clubhouses on "The Street."

After the United States entered World War I, Charter was temporarily closed due to reduced membership caused by widespread member enlistment in the armed forces. For a period of less than two years, between 1917 and 1919, the Charter clubhouse closed its doors, and Charter members left on campus received full membership privileges at Cottage Club. Charter lost seven members in the war, and their sacrifice is commemorated by a plaque located in the "Great Room."

Reopening in 1919, Charter quickly gained a reputation as a club personifying the era of the Roaring '20s, carving a niche for itself on campus in the inter-war years. World War II saw Charter closing along with all of its peer institutions, as members almost universally went off to fight abroad. Charter greatly expanded its membership after the war, but disaster struck closer to home in 1949 when a fire spread rapidly through much of the first and second floors causing heavy damage. A fire marshal responded to the scene of the fire, on seeing the facade of Charter declared, "I have never seen a building survive a fire like this, nothing is indestructible, but this place is damn near." Charter's membership has since often referred to it as "The Indestructible Charter Club," or simply "The Indestructible."

Charter was known throughout the 1950s and 1960s for its hard partying ways—Charter parties were only rivaled at the time by those at perennial animal house Cannon Club. It is suspected, but not known, that at least one Charter member rode with members of Cap and Gown Club in the so-called Great Train Robbery of '63, in which the "dinky" train running from Princeton Junction into Princeton was forced to make a dramatic emergency stop after a car was seen on the tracks, at which point ersatz cowboys rode up to the train on horseback and carried off their dates who had been arriving for the weekend.

The greatest era of the Eating Clubs was beginning to fade by the late 1960s, however, and looking to prop up stagnating membership figures, Charter announced that it would accept female members, over the objection of many members of the grad board, shortly after the university made the switch to coeducation. In 1977, Charter made the switch from bicker selectivity to sign-in openness in order to draw more members. The club remained financially stable throughout the 1970s, 1980s, and 1990s, as six of its peers shut their doors permanently.

Throughout this tumultuous period, Charter's atmosphere remained intact. This was shown best by the infamous Initiation Night of 1988. In 1988, Charter counted as members most of the Varsity Football Team, including many of the '89 section's officers. It was some of these same players who allegedly planned the celebration of the admission of the new sophomore section, which led to 45 members sent to McCosh Infirmary or Princeton Medical Center for alcohol-related reasons. The Princeton Borough Police quickly rounded up the Charter officer corps, and criminal charges were brought against the president and social chair, who were convicted of serving alcohol to minors, fined $500, and sentenced to 30 days in jail. The sentences were later overturned by a Mercer County Court judge, and the two undergraduate officers received probation and were ordered to perform community service. To prevent a similar occurrence, Charter now conducts formal initiations a week after all the other eating clubs, and on what would otherwise be initiation night officially "goes dry." Initiation Night '88 is generally considered to be, along with the Section Party of 1930, one of Charter's most infamous moments.

In the fall of 2010, Charter announced major modifications to its membership admission system, creating a "weighted sign-in" system that gives preference to sophomores judged to be more enthusiastic about the club, based on their involvement in club activities and attendance at events open to sophomores." In February 2011, operating under this new system, Charter was again the only sign in club to fill its sophomore section in the first round of sign-ins.

== Notable alumni ==
- David Adler (1904 Section), architect
- Arthur Schmidt (1912 Section). Infantry officer and recipient of the Army Cross
- Edmund Wilson (1916 Section), literary critic
- James Stewart (1932 Section), actor
- José Ferrer (1933 Section), actor and film director
- Mason Andrews (1940 Section), physician
- T. Berry Brazelton (1940 Section), American pediatrician and author
- Bowie Kuhn (1948 Section), former Major League Baseball Commissioner
- Charles Fried (1956 Section), Harvard Law professor and former Solicitor General
- Joel Rosenman (1963 Section), co-creator of the Woodstock Festival
- Mitch Daniels (1971 Section), Governor of Indiana
- Arthur Grant Duff (1977 Section), British diplomat
- Tom Leighton (1978 Section), Cofounder of Akamai Technology
- Joel Achenbach (1982 Section), writer
- David Duchovny (1982 Section), actor
- Jack Donaghy (1983 Section), Vice President of East Coast Television and Microwave Oven Programming, General Electric
- Phil Goldman (1986 Section), founder of WebTV
- Jeffrey Ambroziak (1989 Section), cartographer, inventor, and attorney
- Ken Simpler (1989 Section), Delaware State Treasurer, 2015 to 2019
- Jonathan Mayer (2008 Section), American computer scientist and lawyer
- Austin Williams (2018 Section), child actor
