= Tower Club =

Eating club at Princeton University

- U.S. Historic district – Contributing property
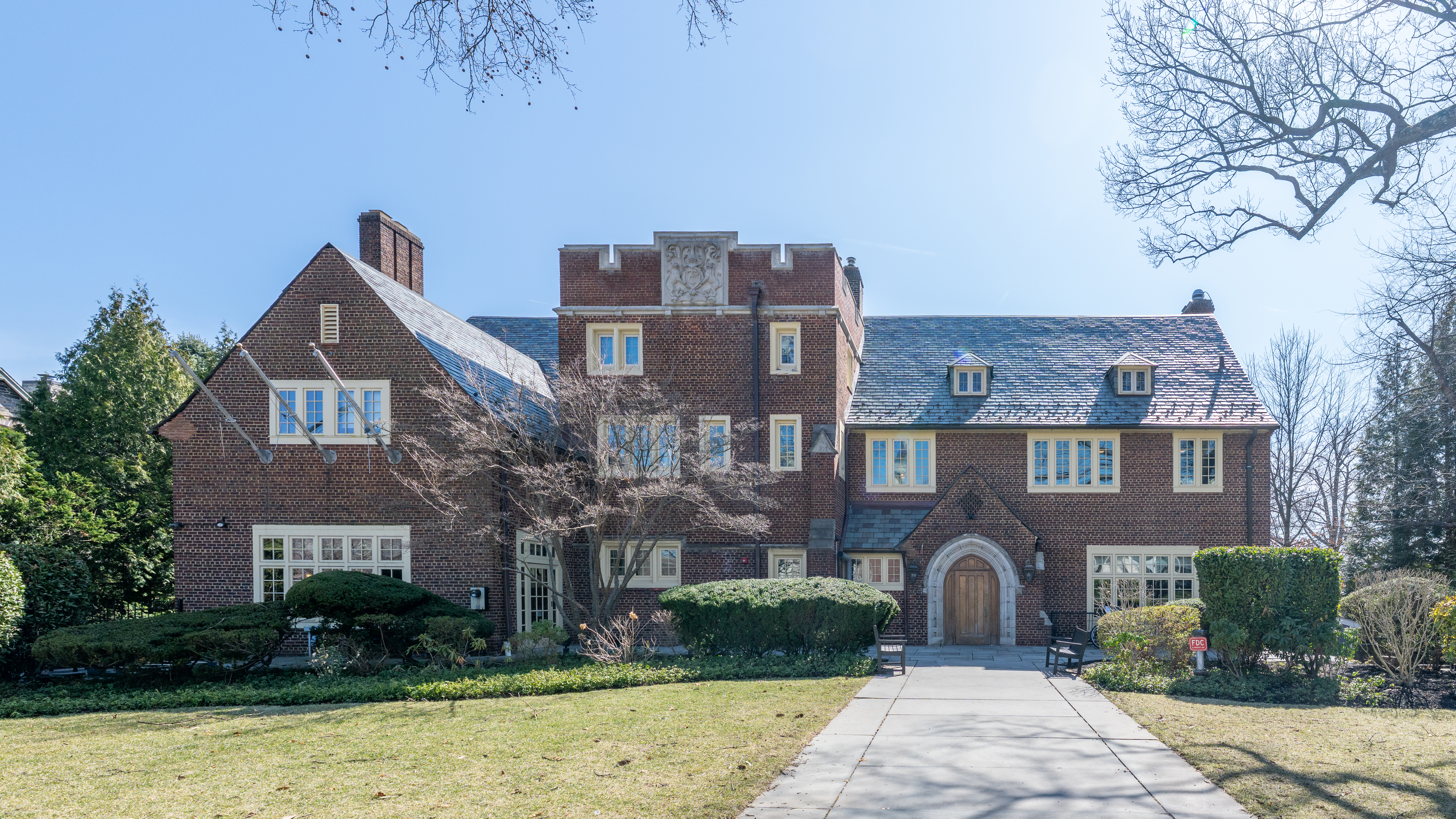

- Location within Mercer County, New Jersey Location within New Jersey Location within the United States
- Location: 13 Prospect Ave, Princeton, New Jersey
- Coordinates: 40°20′51.7″N 74°39′14.3″W
- Built: 1917
- Architect: Roderick B. Barnes
- Architectural style: Collegiate Gothic
- Part of: Princeton Historic District (ID75001143)
- Added to NRHP: 27 June 1975

Princeton Tower Club is one of the eleven eating clubs at Princeton University in Princeton, New Jersey, United States, and one of six clubs to choose its members through a selective process called bicker. Tower is located at 13 Prospect Avenue between the university-run Campus Club and the Cannon Club. It currently has a membership of approximately 220.

Founded in 1903, the club moved several times before settling down at 13 Prospect Avenue in 1917.

== History ==
In the spring of 1902, five Princeton students, John Lee, Henry Pogue, Otto Wolff, Conway Shearer, and Frank Little, led the formation of the new upperclassmen eating club, with a $400 stake placed in 1903.

The club was formed in the old Monastery Club on University Place and totaled 26 members. The club moved to Gulick House on Olden Street and remained there for one year. In 1904, the club moved to a plot of land purchased from the Cottage Club on 89 Prospect Avenue. The new building featured hot-air heating and was improved with new amenities, like a tennis court. The club moved again to the old building for Quadrangle club where it stayed for four years. The club then purchased a new plot of land at 13 Prospect Ave for $25,000. While a structure existed on the premises, there was a desire for a new structured. Designed by Princeton alum Roderic E. Barnes, the new building was constructed in 1917 and is the club's current location.

In 1921, there was a fire at the club, with the most serious damage being on the third floor in the sleeping quarters. Repairs were rapidly undertaken. In 1935, the club donated $5,000 to help fund a new university scholarship. The club remained open during WWII, dropping to its lowest enrollment at 15 members, all of whom were ROTC officers. In 1971, Tower became one of the first clubs to accept women. The club received tax-exempt status in 1972 by hosting university precepts. Reflective of broader campus debate at the time, in 1978, the club voted on potential alternatives to the bicker system but ultimately maintained it.

In 2003, the Tower president was charged with providing alcohol to a minor and causing a nuisance; they resigned. The club accidentally leaked social security numbers for club alumni in 2008. In 2016, Tower was the final club to use the double bicker system, allowing bickerees to choose two clubs.

== Membership ==
Only currently enrolled Princeton students can be members of Tower Club; the majority of the membership is composed of juniors and seniors, with new sophomore members admitted each spring during "bicker," a selection process lasting three days. Members then discuss who to admit in a "positive" process, where no negative comments are allowed. There is also typically a smaller bicker process held in the fall and open exclusively to students in their junior and senior years.

In 2024, Tower accepted 165 students, the most students of any of the bicker clubs and had an acceptance rate of around 60%. In 2025, Tower’s acceptance rate dropped to a record low of 42.4%. Tower's current president is Vincent Jiang, who was also selected to lead the Interclub Council, the first time for a Tower president since 2001.

== Reputation ==
Tower is traditionally known to attract both artistic and politically engaged students on campus. The club has a reputation for having the best food out of all the eating clubs. Tower is known for its outsized political power, with many members leading notable campus political organizations.
