= Princeton University eating clubs =

Institutions resembling dining halls and social houses

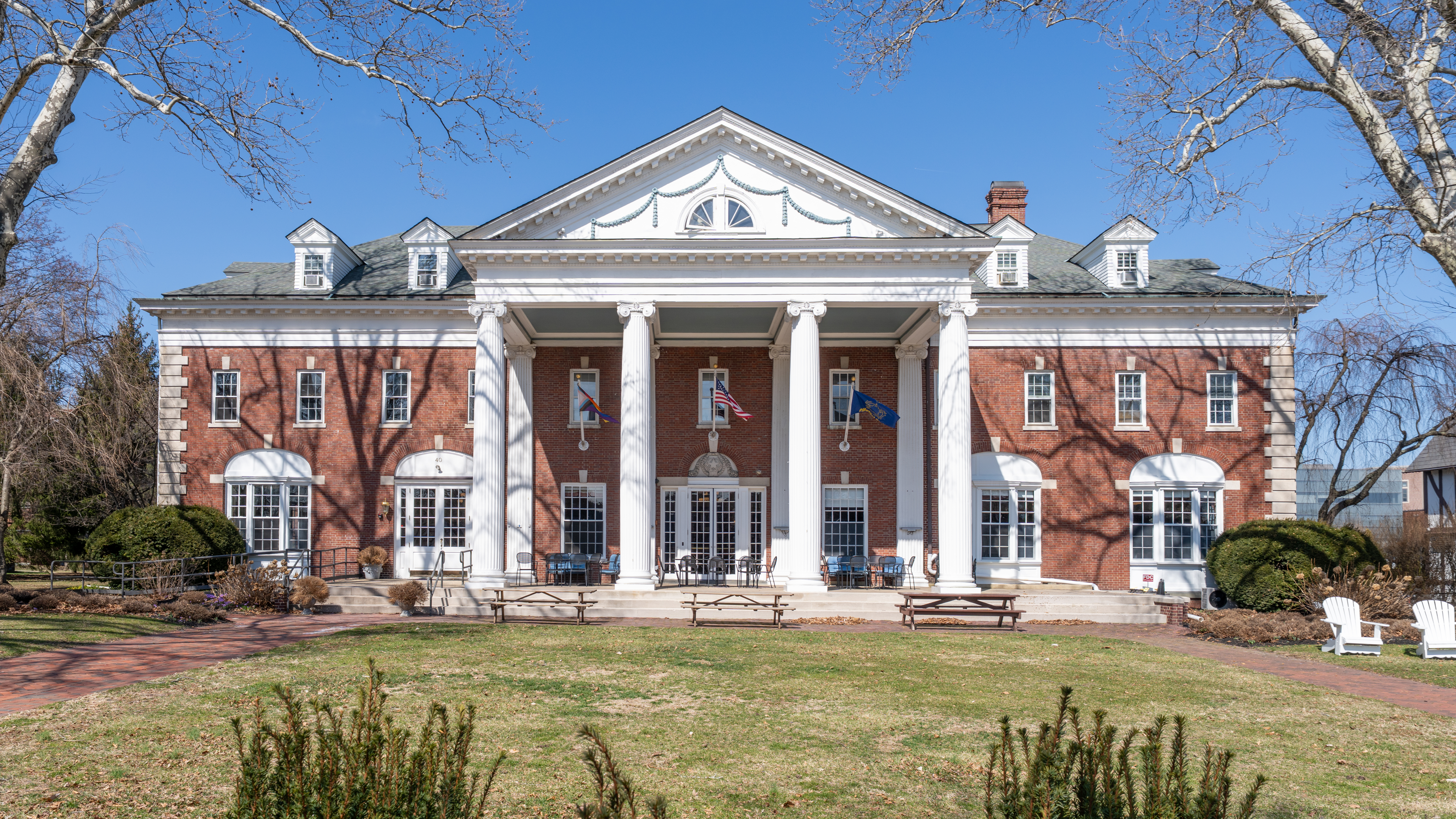
Colonial Club

Princeton University eating clubs are private institutions resembling both dining halls and social houses, where the majority of Princeton University undergraduate upperclassmen (typically juniors and seniors, unless there are exemptions voted within the house council) generally eat their meals. Each eating club occupies a large mansion on Prospect Avenue, one of the main roads that runs through the Princeton campus, with the exception of Terrace Club which is just around the corner on Washington Road. This area is known to students colloquially as "The Street". Princeton's eating clubs are the primary setting in F. Scott Fitzgerald's 1920 debut novel, This Side of Paradise, and the clubs appeared prominently in the 2004 novel The Rule of Four.

Princeton’s aforementioned undergraduate upperclassmen have their choice of eleven eating clubs. Six clubs—Cannon Club, Cap and Gown Club, Princeton Tower Club, The Ivy Club, Tiger Inn and University Cottage Club—choose their members through a selective process called "bicker", involving an interview process, though the actual deliberations are secret. Five clubs—Charter Club, Cloister Inn, Colonial Club, Quadrangle Club, and Terrace Club—are non-selective "sign-in" clubs, with members chosen through a lottery process. While many upperclassmen (third- and fourth-year students) at Princeton take their meals at the eating clubs, the clubs are private institutions and are not officially affiliated with Princeton University. They have been subject to criticism for perceived elitism.

== Social functions ==
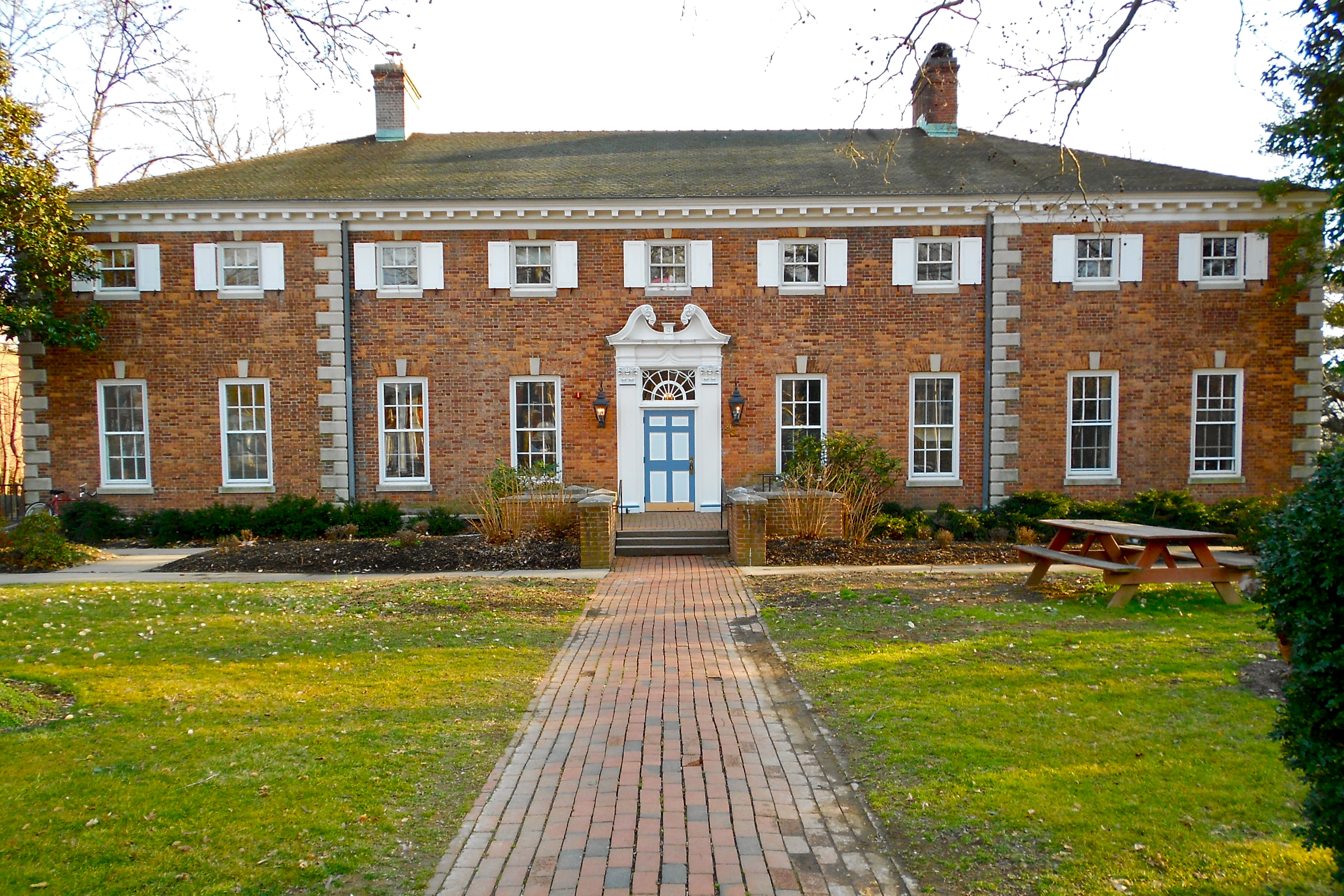
Quadrangle Club

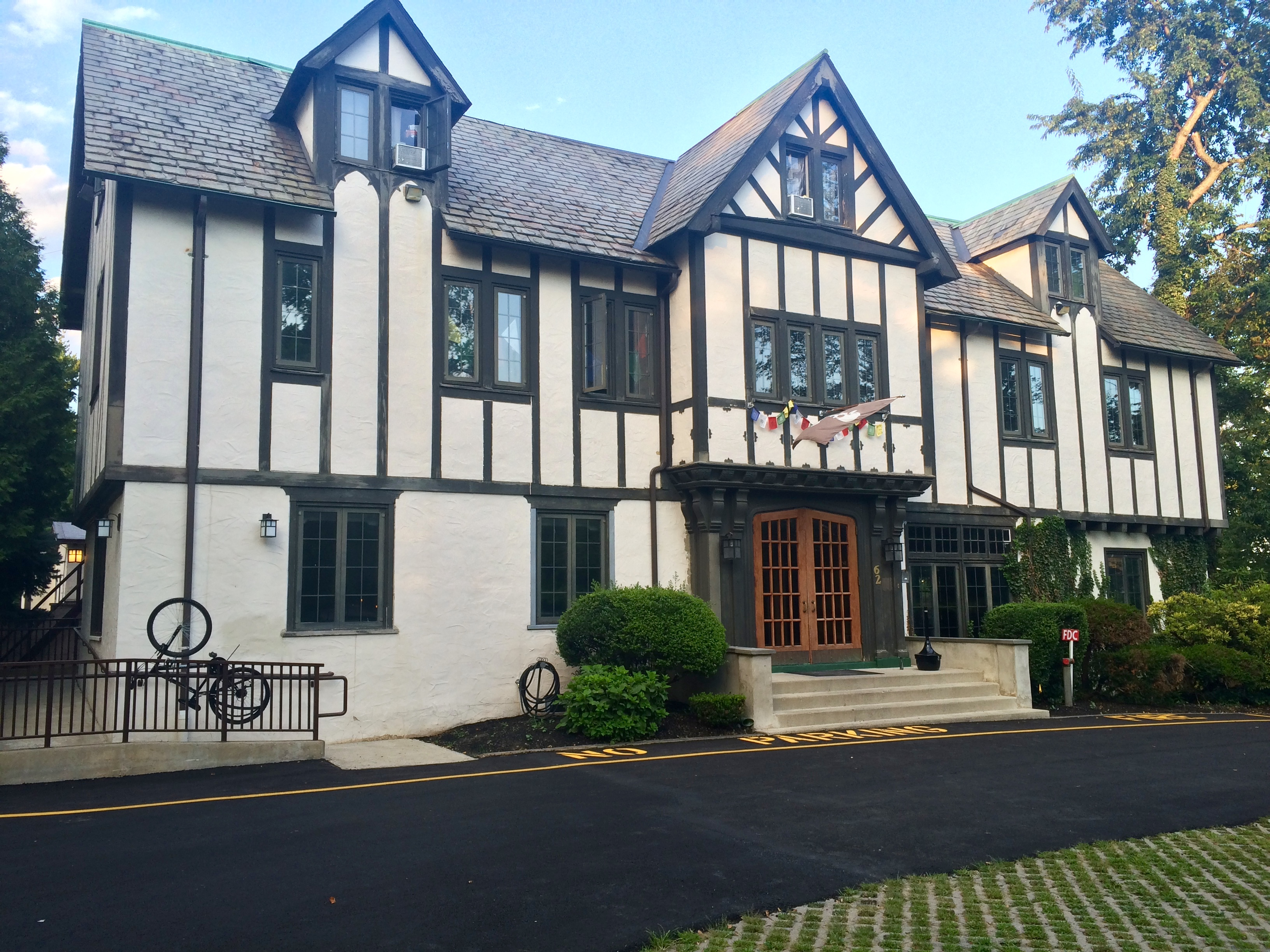
Terrace Club

The primary function of the eating clubs is to serve as dining halls for the majority of third- and fourth-year students. Unlike fraternities and sororities, to which the clubs are sometimes compared, all of the clubs admit both male and female members, and members (with the exception of some of the undergraduate officers) do not live in the mansion.

The eating clubs also provide many services for their members. Each club, in general, has a living room, library, computer cluster, billiard room, and tap room. Members frequently use club facilities for studying and socializing. Each club also has a large lawn, either in front of or behind the mansion, and on days with nice weather, one will often see Princeton students playing various sports, such as lawn bowling, on club lawns.

On most Thursday and Saturday nights, the Street is the primary social venue for Princeton students, and each club will have music and parties. Some parties are open to all university students; these are colloquially called "PUID", in reference to the Princeton University ID card which must be shown to bouncers for entrance. Other parties are only open to members or students with special passes, which must be obtained from members. Friday nights are much more low-key at Princeton, and clubs that are open are usually open only to members. The notable exceptions are Charter Club and Colonial Club, which are open to all university students. Each club also has semiformal events and formal dinners and dances.

Special events are held annually or biannually at every club. Some are specific to particular clubs; these are usually themed parties, such as "Boxers and Blazers" at Cap and Gown. Other events are common to all clubs. These events include: Lawnparties, when clubs hire bands to play outdoors on their lawns on the Sunday before the first full week of fall classes; Winter Formals, which take place on the last Saturday before winter break; Initiations, where new sophomore recruits are introduced to club life (usually in early February); and Houseparties, a three-day festival at the end of spring term during which each club has a Friday night formal, a Saturday night semiformal, a champagne brunch on Sunday morning, and another round of Lawnparties on Sunday afternoon.

== History ==
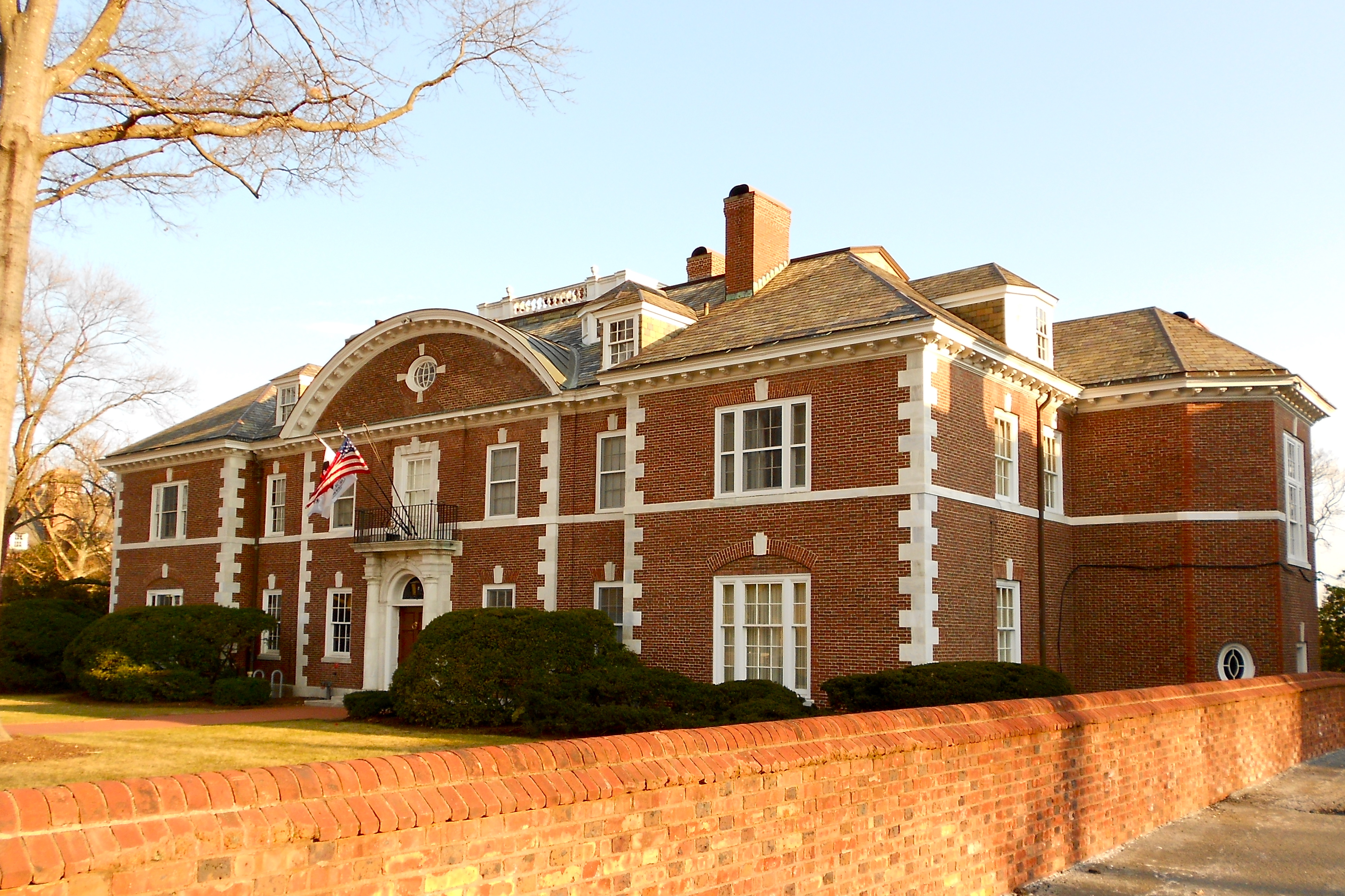
Cottage Club

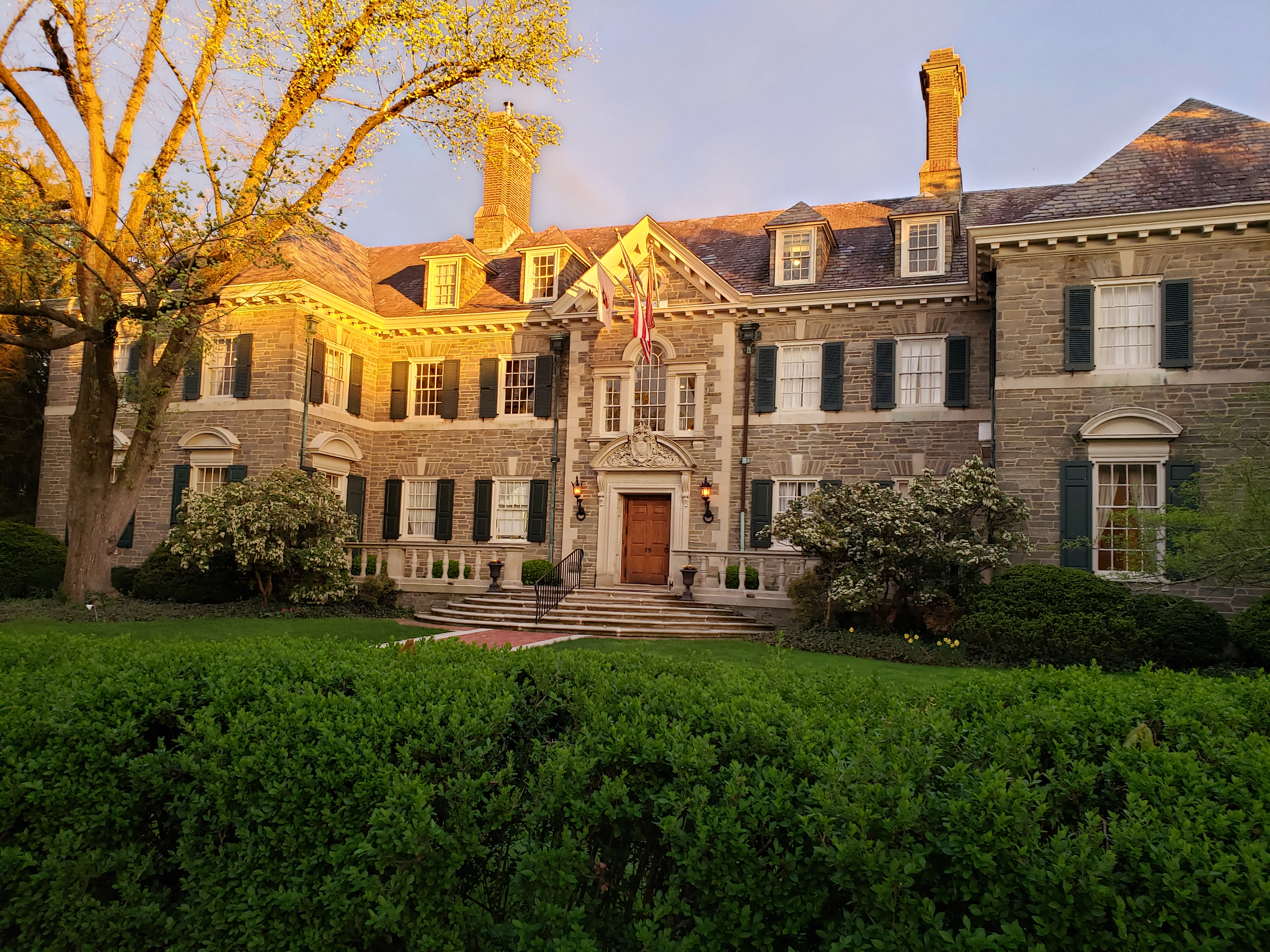
Charter Club

The earliest social clubs on the Princeton campus, named "The Well-Meaning Club" and "The Plain-Dealing Club", were founded in the 1760s. These clubs were banned due to dispensary-related reasons but later reemerged as the American Whig Society ("Whig") and the Cliosophic Society ("Clio"). Members of the two societies, which accounted for the majority of the student body, engaged in vigorous competition for recognition in sports as well as campus honors. During the early days of Princeton University, the Whig and Clio societies dominated the social life and activities of the student body. The first eating clubs emerged under this context as small informal dining societies, in which Princeton students gathered to take meals at a common table and often disbanded when the founders graduated. In 1843 Beta Theta Pi, a national fraternity at the time, founded a chapter on the Princeton campus, which was soon followed by nine more organizations. Fraternities and secret societies were banned from Princeton soon after, with the exception of the university's political, literary, and debating societies. The banning of fraternities, which lasted until the 1980s, gave way for eating clubs to gradually take on the role of social organizations.

A fire that damaged the University's refectory in 1856 caused a major rise in student membership in eating clubs. Towards the end of the 19th century the eating clubs began to recruit new members as old ones left and also began to lease or buy permanent facilities. Ivy Club was the first of the permanent eating clubs. It was followed shortly after by University Cottage Club. This process was greatly aided by Moses Taylor Pyne, who provided financial assistance to most of the eating clubs. An early member of Ivy Club, Pyne was heavily involved in the early development of Cap and Gown Club, Campus Club, Elm Club, Cloister Inn, and many others. The new clubs (along with other new extracurricular activities) gradually eroded the central role that debate societies Whig and Clio played in undergraduate student life. The decline in popularity and energy of the societies led to their merger into the American Whig-Cliosophic Society, which still exists today.

Twenty eating clubs have existed since Ivy Club opened in 1879, though never more than 18 at any one time. At various points, many of the eating clubs fell on hard times and closed their doors or merged with others. The now-defunct eating clubs include Campus Club, Key and Seal Club, Arch Club, Gateway Club, Court Club, Arbor Inn, and Prospect Club. Dial, Elm, and Cannon Clubs merged to form DEC Club, which operated from 1990 to 1998. The most recent club to close was Campus Club, which shut down in 2005. The eating clubs and their members have figured prominently among Princeton alumni active in careers in literature and the performing arts. For example, the distinguished Pulitzer Prize writer Booth Tarkington, who transformed the Drama Association into the Princeton Triangle Club, was a prominent member of Ivy Club. F. Scott Fitzgerald was a member of the University Cottage Club. The actors Jimmy Stewart and David Duchovny were members of the Charter Club, and the actors Dean Cain and Brooke Shields were members of Cap and Gown.

Eating clubs have sometimes closed and returned to active life. The Cloister Club was reopened in the 1970s and continues successfully. Some closed eating clubs have been purchased by the university for use as academic and administrative buildings. Dial Lodge is now the Bendheim Center for Finance; Elm Club temporarily housed the Classics Department and European Cultural Studies Program and is the new home of the Carl A. Fields Center for Equality and Cultural Understanding. The donation of Campus Club to the university for use as a space for social events was completed in 2006. Cannon Club was briefly converted into Notestein Hall, an office for the University Writing Center, but has since been repurchased by alumni. The club was reopened as Cannon Dial Elm Club in fall 2011.

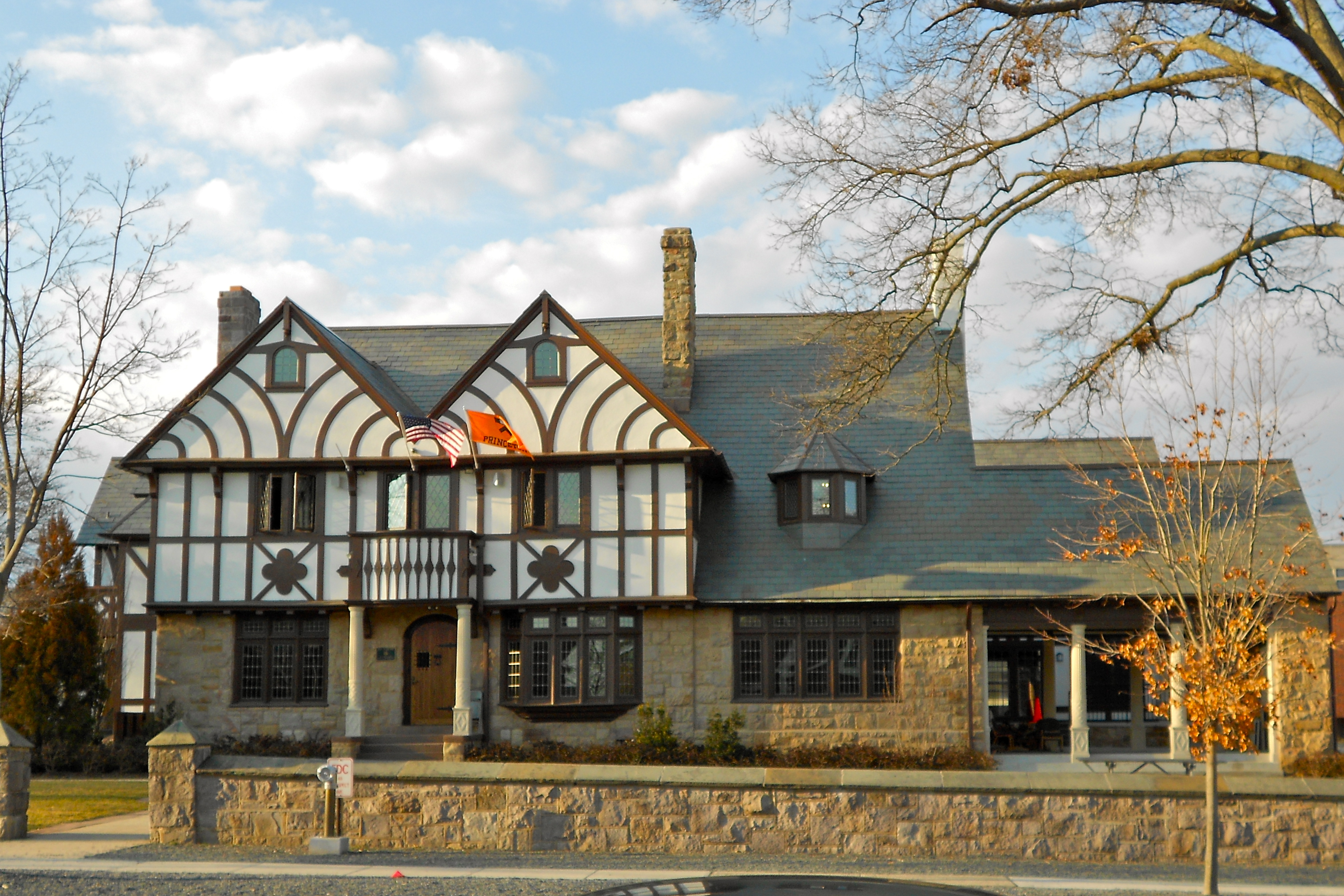
Tiger Inn

In 1979, undergraduate Sally Frank filed suit against then all-male clubs Ivy Club, Cottage Club, and Tiger Inn for sex discrimination. While Cottage chose to coeducate during the intervening years, Ivy Club and Tiger Inn were forced to become co-ed organizations in 1991, 22 years after Princeton first admitted female students, after their appeal to the Supreme Court regarding Frank's lawsuit was denied.

The eating clubs have attracted controversy, being viewed as outdated, elitist institutions (Woodrow Wilson was, in part, driven from Princeton by alumni and administrators because he loathed the effect the clubs had on academic and social life). A major part of the controversy was the difference in cost between joining an eating club and buying a university dining plan. By 2006, the difference was over $2,000 for most clubs, and this difference was not covered by university financial aid. In November 2006, Princeton administrators announced that they would increase upperclass financial aid packages by $2,000, in order to cover the difference in costs. However, as of December 2009, there was still a "significant discrepancy" between the university financial aid package and the cost of some clubs.

=== Historical list of clubs ===
Name	Years of operation	Location	Historical photos	Year clubhouse constructed	Sign-in/Bicker	Year co-ed	Status of clubhouse
Ivy Club	1879–current	43 Prospect Ave	link (archived)	1897	Bicker	1991	current site of club
University Cottage Club	1886–current	51 Prospect Ave	link (archived)	1906	Bicker	1986	current site of club
Tiger Inn	1890–current	48 Prospect Ave	link (archived)	1895	Bicker	1991	current site of club
Cap and Gown Club	1890–current	61 Prospect Ave	link (archived)	1908	Bicker	1970	current site of club
Colonial Club	1891–current	40 Prospect Ave	link (archived)	1906	Sign-in	1969	current site of club
Cannon Club (Cannon Dial Elm Club)	1895–1975, 2011–current	21 Prospect Ave	link (archived)	1910	Bicker	2011	current site of club
Dial, Elm, Cannon (DEC)	1990–1998	58 Prospect Ave 26 Prospect Ave	link (archived)	1901 (originally the Elm Clubhouse); 1917 (originally Dial Lodge)	Snicker (semi-selective)	1990	Closed in 1998. Reopened in 2011 as Cannon Dial Elm in the Cannon facility.
Dial Lodge	1907–1988	26 Prospect Ave	link (archived)	1917	Sign-in	1970	sold to Princeton University, now the Bendheim Center for Finance. Reopened in 2011 as Cannon Dial Elm in the Cannon facility
Elm Club	1895–1973, 1978–1989	58 Prospect Ave	link (archived)	1901	Sign-in	1970	sold to Princeton University, now the Carl A. Fields Center. Reopened in 2011 as Cannon Dial Elm in the Cannon facility
Campus Club	1900–2005	5 Prospect Ave	link (archived)	1909	Sign-in	1970	donated to Princeton University, reopened as a student lounge
Princeton Charter Club	1901–current	79 Prospect Ave	link (archived)	1914	Other	1970	current site of club
Quadrangle Club	1901–current	33 Prospect Ave	link (archived)	1916	Sign-in	1970	current site of club
Princeton Tower Club	1902–current	13 Prospect Ave	link (archived)	1917	Bicker	1971	current site of club
Terrace Club	1904–current	62 Washington Rd	link (archived)	1920 (pre-existing building)	Sign-in	1969	current site of club
Key and Seal Club	1904–1968	83 Prospect Ave	link (archived)	1925	Bicker	Never	sold to Princeton University, formerly part of Stevenson Hall, now the Bobst Center for Peace and Justice
Arch Club	1911–1917	on Washington Rd	link (archived)	1914 (pre-existing building)	Bicker	Never	demolished; now the site of the School of Public and International Affairs
Cloister Inn	1912–1972, 1977–2025	65 Prospect Ave	link (archived)	1924	Sign-in	1970	current site of club
Gateway Club	1913–1937	70 Washington Rd	link (archived)	1927 (pre-existing building)	Bicker	Never	demolished; now the site of the Center for Jewish Life
Court Club	1921–1964	91 Prospect Ave	link (archived)	1927	Bicker	Never	sold to Princeton University, formerly part of Stevenson Hall, now home to "Office of Corporate and Foundation Relations"
Arbor Inn	1923–1939	5 Ivy Lane	link (archived)	1935	Bicker	Never	sold to Princeton University, now the Center for the Study of Religion
Prospect Club	1941–1959	70 Washington Rd	link (archived)	1927 (as Gateway Club)	Bicker	Never	demolished; now the site of the Center for Jewish Life

== Joining clubs ==
=== Bicker ===
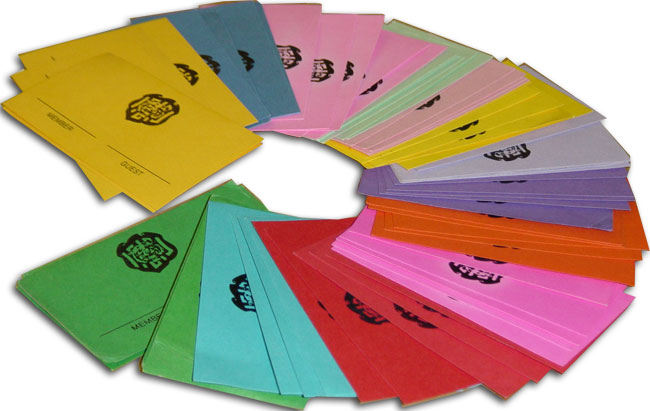
An assortment of Tiger Inn colored eating club guest passes

The six selective eating clubs pick new members in a process called "bicker". Bicker begins each spring semester during the week following intersession break, when interested sophomores come to the club they would like to join. The bicker process varies widely by club, ranging from staid interviews conducted by club members to raucous games designed to foster competition among potential inductees. Following two or three evenings of bicker activities, the club membership selects new members in closed sessions, the conduct of which varies from club to club. The clubs initiate their new members the following weekend.

Additionally, some bicker clubs conduct a smaller "Fall Bicker" for third and fourth year students. Admission numbers during fall bicker are typically much lower than those of spring bicker, as fall bicker is a chance for clubs to adjust their membership numbers to account for members who may have dropped club membership during the spring semester or over the summer. Bicker clubs hold parties with restricted admission more frequently than their sign-in counterparts. Such events often require that non-members present a pass, a colored card bearing the club's insignia, in order to enter. Non-members may also gain entry to parties at some bicker clubs by entering with a member, or through membership in the Inter-Club Council.

=== Sign-ins ===
The five non-selective eating clubs pick new members in a process called "sign-ins". Students rank the five sign-in clubs, or wait-lists for those clubs, in their order of preference. If more students choose a club as their first choice than that club is able to accept as members, a random lottery is used to determine which students are accepted. The remaining students are then placed into their second choice club or wait list, provided it has not filled, in which case they would be placed into their third choice, and so on.

Students who choose to bicker and are not admitted to a club via sign-in are immediately placed into a second-round sign-in where they will be placed into their top choice of club that has not filled. While not every student will get into their first choice of club, either through sign-in or bicker, every student seeking membership has been placed into one of the clubs, though sometimes after a significant waiting period.

== Alternatives ==
For upperclassmen who choose not to join the eating clubs, there are alternative social/eating options. These include:

- University dining facilities, usually by drawing back into an underclass residential college. Residential Advisors in the colleges can be eating club members, but are required by the university to take some of their meals in their college. Starting in the 2007–2008 Academic year, upperclassmen have the option of joining one of the new four-year residential colleges instead of an eating club. The four-year colleges are Whitman College, Mathey College and Butler College as of fall 2009. All three colleges have new dining halls that are more competitive with the food offered in the clubs.
- The Center for Jewish Life, a Kosher dining hall.
- Independent life. Students who cook for themselves are referred to as "independents". While kitchens are located in many dormitories on campus, the most favorable option of independents are the Spelman Halls. These dorms are composed mostly of four-person suites (but there are some doubles) with private baths and kitchens.
- Student Co-ops: student co-ops are becoming an increasingly popular option on campus. Students rotate cooking once a week, and manage the co-ops themselves. They often have their own social events, including the Co-op Hop, a semi-formal in which all three co-ops showcase their best dishes and desserts.
  - The Two Dickinson Street Co-op, a 50-member vegetarian co-op located immediately off campus in a university-owned house.
  - The Brown Co-op, a non-vegetarian co-op located in Brown Hall, an on-campus dormitory building.
  - The International Food Co-op (IFC), a co-op that features international cuisine and members from around the world. The IFC is located in Laughlin Hall.
- Fraternities and sororities are a complementary social option to the eating clubs, but their organizations are not recognized by the university. Most fraternity/sorority members also join eating clubs.
- Class societies (analogous to Yale's secret societies) such as Phi /fē/

== See also ==
- Collegiate secret societies in North America
- Harvard College social clubs
- Senior societies at University of Pennsylvania
