= University Cottage Club =

Eating club at Princeton University

- U.S. National Register of Historic Places
- U.S. Historic district – Contributing property
- New Jersey Register of Historic Places
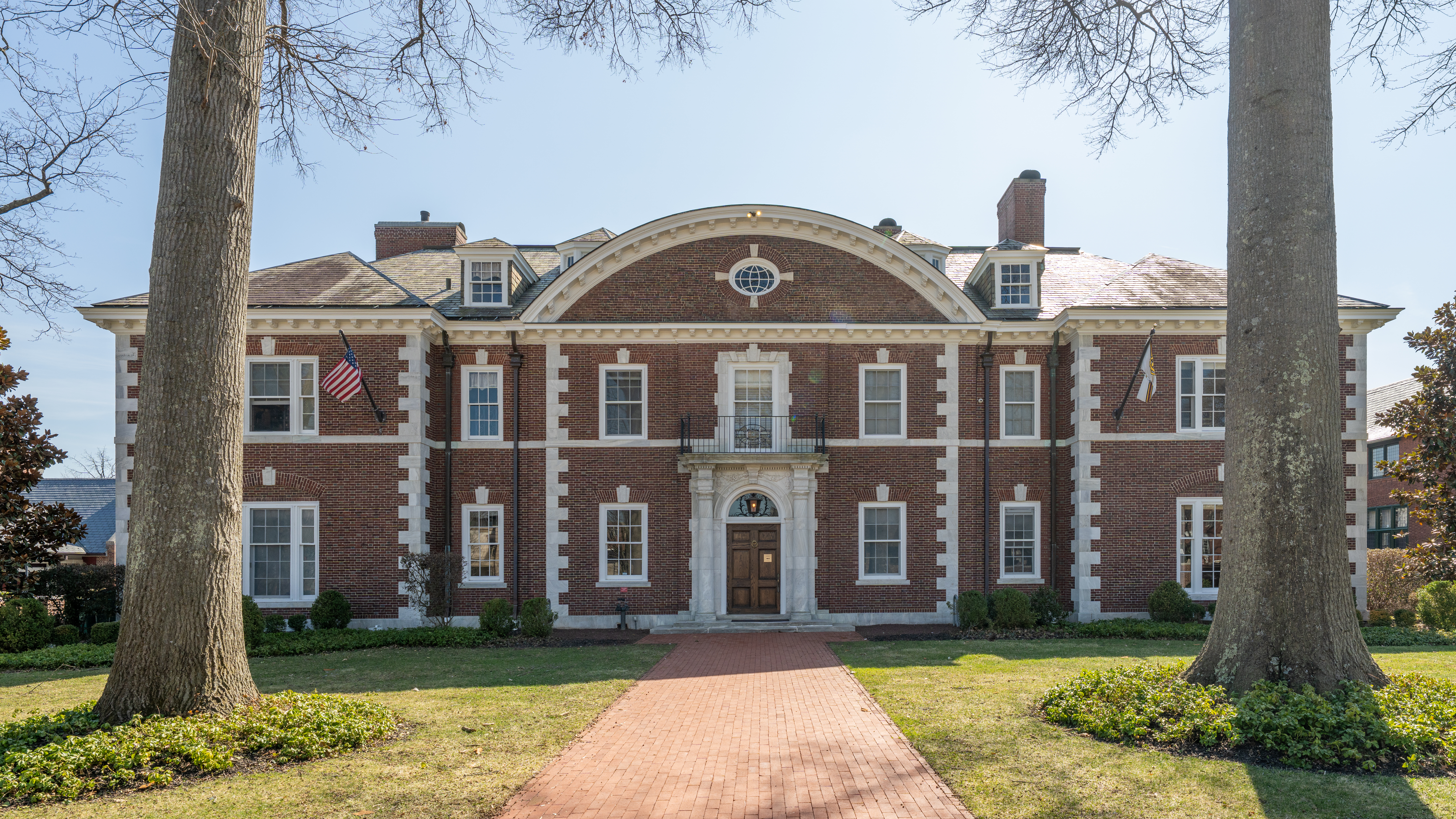

- Location within Mercer County, New Jersey Location within New Jersey Location within the United States
- Location: Princeton, New Jersey
- Coordinates: 40°20′53.8″N 74°39′06.2″W
- Built: 1906
- Architect: Charles Follen McKim of McKim, Mead, and White
- Architectural style: Colonial Revival
- Part of: Princeton Historic District (ID75001143)
- NRHP reference No.: 99001315
- NJRHP No.: 175

Significant dates
- Added to NRHP: November 19, 1999
- Designated NJRHP: September 14, 1999

The University Cottage Club or simply Cottage Club is one of eleven eating clubs at Princeton University, in Princeton, New Jersey, United States. It is one of the six bicker clubs, along with The Ivy Club, Tiger Inn, Cap and Gown Club, Cannon Club and Tower Club.

== History ==
In 1884, a group of freshmen who called themselves "The Seven Wise Men of Grease" of the Class of 1888, chose to eat in a private room on the second floor of Dohm's Restaurant on Nassau Street across from the campus. In their sophomore year, the group moved up Nassau Street to a hotel on the corner of Railroad Avenue (University Place) known as The University Hotel. In September of their junior year as they were joined by several other students, they found a small house immediately south of The University Hotel on Railroad Avenue (where Hamilton Hall stands) owned by the college, known as "The University Cottage". A couple was hired to cook and serve their meals. Prior to their graduation in 1888, the group invited members from the sophomore class to join their new venue. In 1889, new members of this society adopted legal papers and agreed on the name "The University Cottage Club of Princeton."

In 1890, a lot on Prospect Avenue (where the modern clubhouse stands) was purchased and a shingled Victorian clubhouse was built in 1892. The enrollment continued to grow and this structure was moved to Library Place when plans were made for a larger building. The 2 1/2-story Georgian Revival clubhouse was designed by Charles Follen McKim of the New York architectural firm McKim, Mead and White in 1903 and built in 1906.

The library on the second floor is modeled on the fourteenth century library in Merton College, Oxford University. In the Dining Room, one such carving reads “Ubi Amici Ibidem Sunt Opes” (“Where there are friends there are riches”) which has become over the years a motto of the Club.

In 1979, Cottage Club was one of three all-male eating clubs sued by 1980 Princeton graduate Sally Frank for sex discrimination. Ms. Frank prevailed in 1985. Following the suit, the Club voted to admit women in early 1986. Cottage has historically been numbered among the "Big Four" eating clubs of Princeton University (the others are Ivy, Cap and Gown, and Tiger Inn).

Recent renovations have kept the club in first-class condition while preserving its historic beauty. Many young literary enthusiasts like to visit the library where F. Scott Fitzgerald began his novel This Side of Paradise.

On September 14, 1999, the Club was entered onto the New Jersey Register of Historic Places. On November 15, 1999, it was added to the National Register of Historic Places based on the architectural structure of the building, high degree of historic integrity, and significant cultural contributions to the community.

== See also ==
- National Register of Historic Places listings in Mercer County, New Jersey
