= Campus Club =

Eating club at Princeton University

- U.S. Historic district – Contributing property
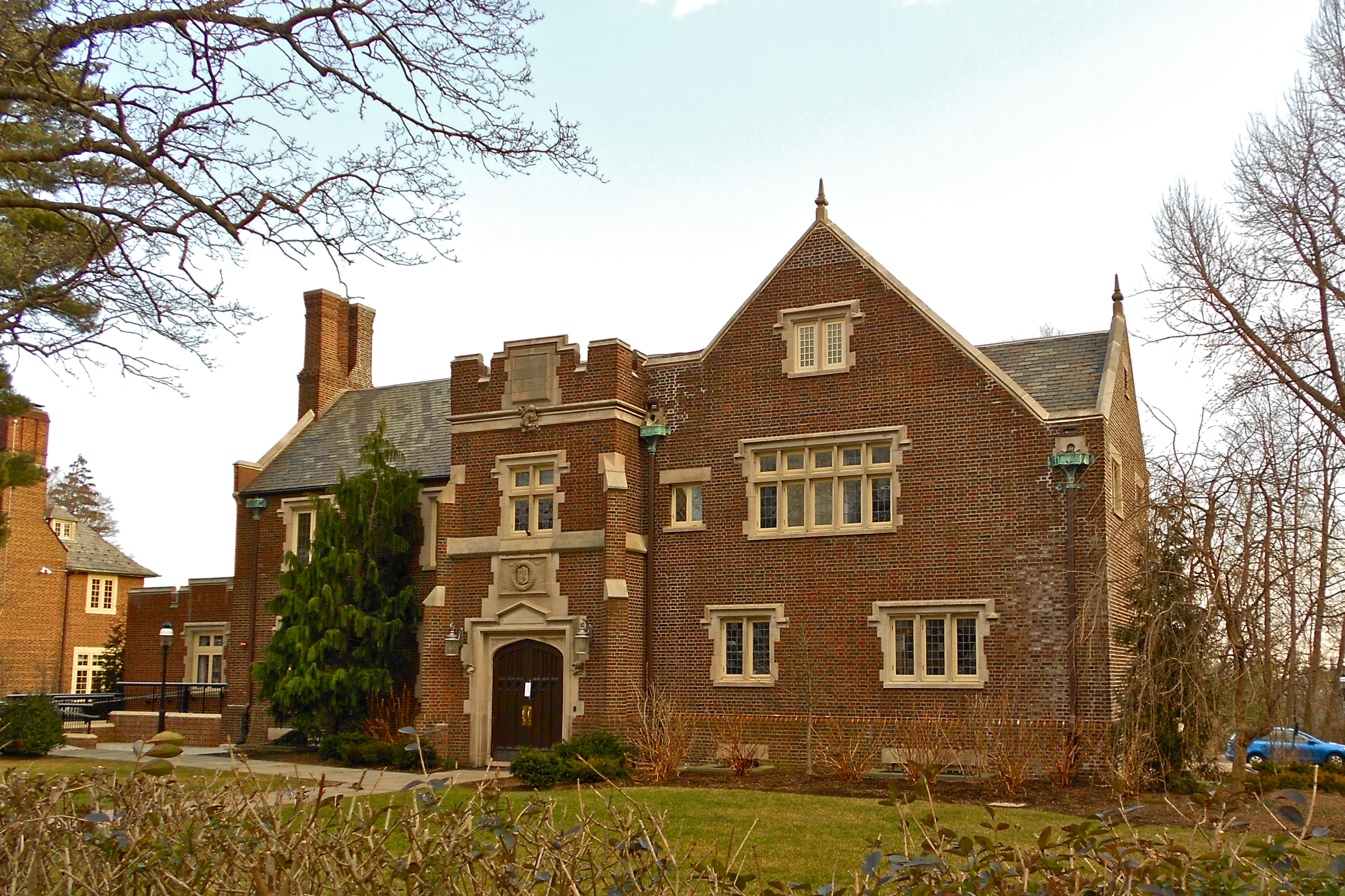

- Location within Mercer County, New Jersey Location within New Jersey Location within the United States
- Location: 5 Prospect Ave, Princeton, New Jersey
- Coordinates: 40°20′51.2″N 74°39′16.0″W
- Built: 1909
- Architect: Raleigh C. Gildersleeve
- Architectural style: Collegiate Gothic
- Part of: Princeton Historic District (ID75001143)
- Added to NRHP: 27 June 1975

Campus Club was one of the undergraduate eating clubs at Princeton University. Located on the corner of Washington Road and Prospect Avenue, Campus was founded in 1900. It was one of the eating clubs that abandoned the selective bicker process to choose members non-selectively, a status it held for over twenty years.

In an attempt to restore the waning popularity of the club, the club's board pressured the undergraduate officers to reinstate bicker in 2004, causing Campus to become one of six selective clubs (out of eleven total clubs). However, due to the unpopularity of bicker among its members, the club returned to being a sign-in club in the spring of 2005. Facing another year of exceptionally low membership and resulting financial trouble, Campus Club closed later the same year.

In November 2005, the former members and alumni of Campus Club voted to donate the building to the university, under the condition that the 11,000 sq ft (1,000 m^{2}) mansion remain a social venue for Princeton students.

After undergoing renovations for over two years, Campus Club reopened on September 18, 2009, as a clubhouse open to all members of the Princeton community.

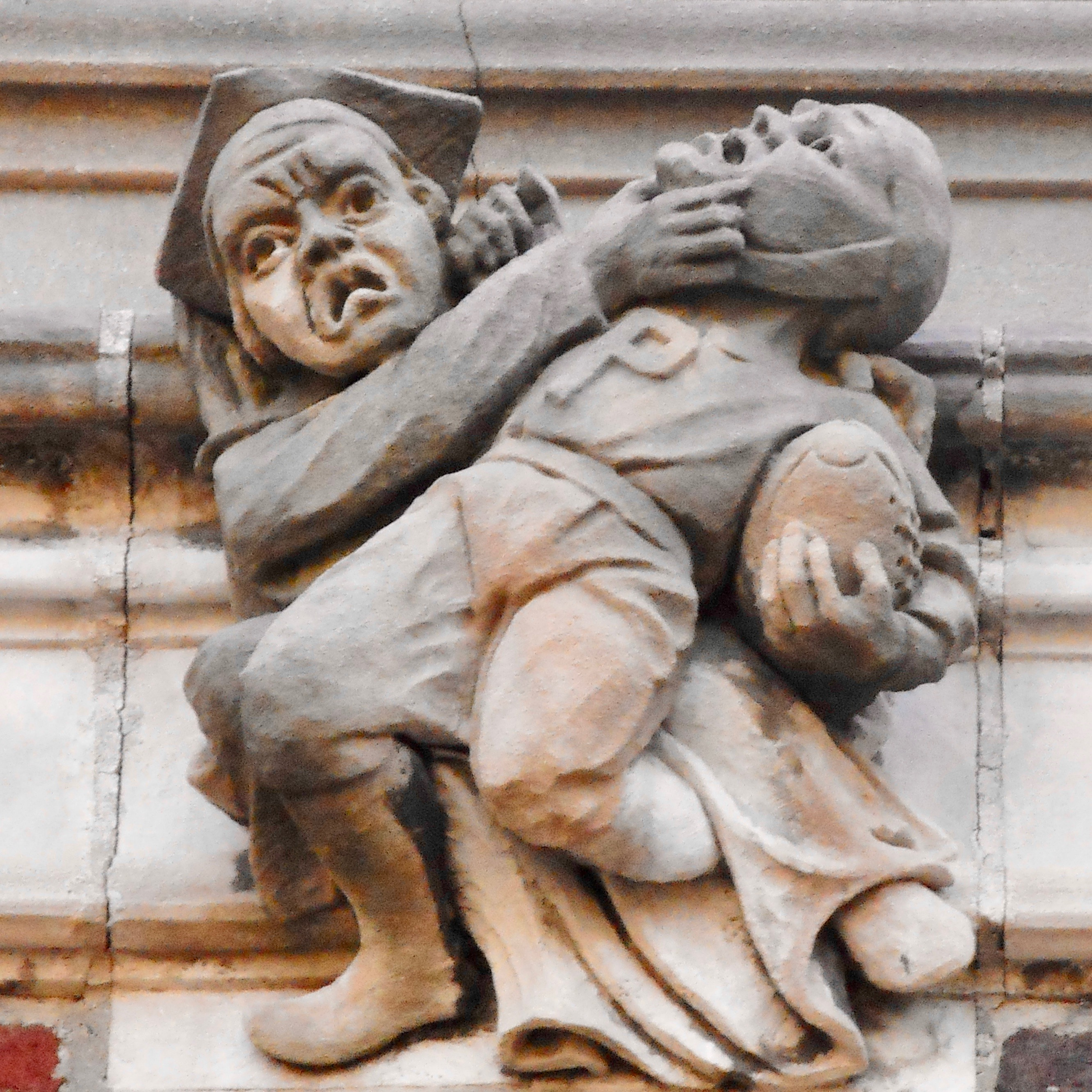
Sculpture near the top of the tower

== History ==
During the 1900–1901 school year, a number of undergraduates from the now-defunct Yama and Ovando Clubs took a lease on a small house on Olden Street in Princeton. Called "The Incubator," the undergraduates used this house as a temporary location while they searched for a more permanent clubhouse.

In January 1901, the newly elected members of Campus Club began negotiations to purchase the residence of Professor Andrew Fleming West, which was located at the corner of Washington Road and Prospect Avenue (where Campus Club stands today). The club members financed the purchase of the West house through sale of approximately $45,000 of "Princeton Campus Club Bonds." Once the residence was acquired, the new members began using the West residence as their clubhouse.

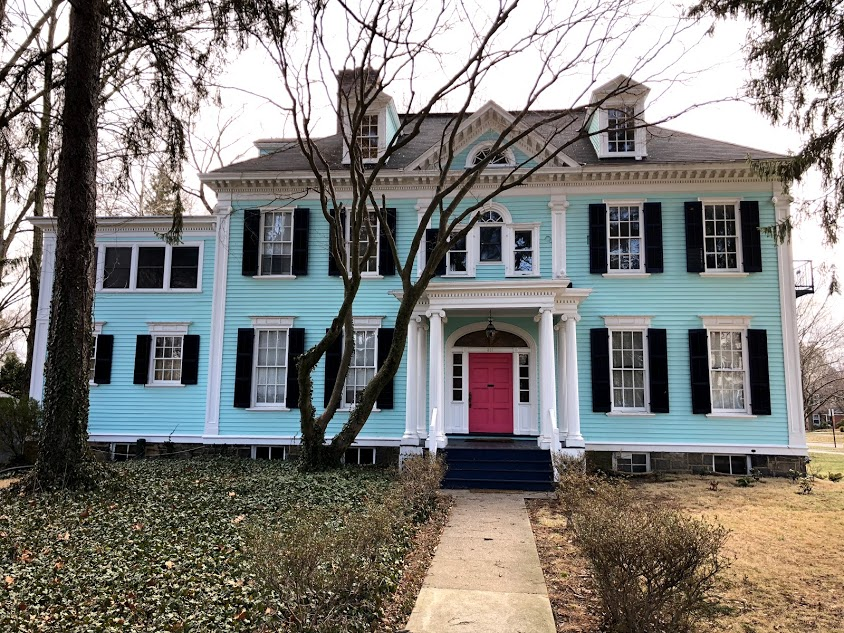
The West residence as it stands today. This building served as the original Princeton Campus Club from approximately 1901–1910. It has since been moved to its current location, and exists as a private apartment building.

In 1909, the members of Campus Club elected to construct a new clubhouse, and the original West house was moved to the corner of Nassau Street and Princeton Avenue. The new clubhouse, designed by Raleigh C. Gildersleeve, who had previously designed McCosh Hall and completed alterations to Cap and Gown Club, was completed weeks prior to the 1910 commencement.

On November 24, 1951, a fire broke out inside of Campus Club. The fire caused extensive damage to the third floor, and a major renovation was required. Renovations were completed in 1953, and the club remained in this state until it was acquired by the university in 2005.
