= Cloister Inn =

Eating club at Princeton University

- U.S. Historic district – Contributing property
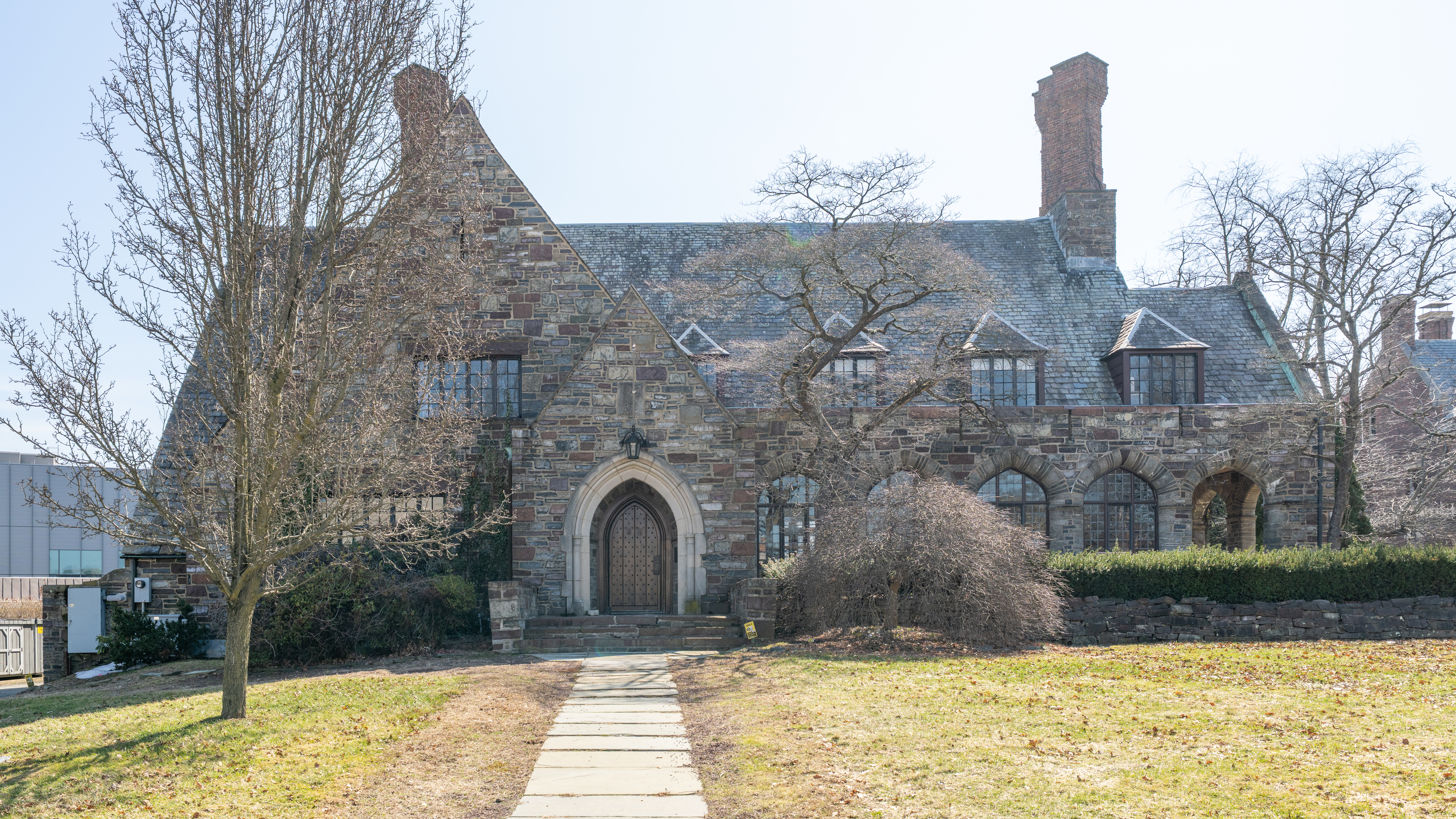

- Location within Mercer County, New Jersey Location within New Jersey Location within the United States
- Location: 65 Prospect Ave, Princeton, New Jersey
- Coordinates: 40°20′55.0″N 74°39′02.0″W
- Built: 1924
- Architect: Albert Relsen
- Architectural style: Collegiate Gothic
- Part of: Princeton Historic District (ID75001143)
- Added to NRHP: 27 June 1975

Cloister Inn is one of the undergraduate eating clubs at Princeton University in Princeton, New Jersey, United States.

Founded in 1912, Cloister occupies a neo-Gothic building on Prospect Avenue, between Cap and Gown Club and Charter Club. Cloister closed temporarily in 1972, becoming open to all Princeton alumni, before reopening as an undergraduate club in 1977. The club is "sign-in", meaning that it selects its members from a lottery process rather than the bicker process used by several of the eating clubs. Cloister typically attracts an athletic crowd and its members often include a number of Olympians. The official motto of the club is “Where everybody knows your name”.

== History ==
Cloister Inn was founded in 1912. The present building was constructed in 1924.

It was designed by architects R.H. Scannell and Charles Lewis Bowman NRHP

Cloister received mention in Ian Caldwell and Dustin Thomason's 2004 bestselling novel The Rule of Four. Caldwell, a 1998 graduate of Princeton, was a member of Cloister.

== Notable alumni ==
=== Business ===
- Robert Briskman '54, co-founder of Sirius Satellite Radio and Technical Executive of Sirius XM Radio
- Tad Smith '87, chief executive of Sotheby's

=== Literature and the arts ===
- Craig Mazin '92, screenwriter and director
- Ian Caldwell '98, co-author of the bestselling novel The Rule of Four, which was set at Princeton and includes several scenes that take place at Cloister
- Nicholas Confessore '98, political correspondent for The New York Times

=== Politics, government, and public affairs ===
- Anne-Marie Slaughter '80, president and CEO of the New America Foundation and former director of policy planning for the U.S. State Department
- Eliot Spitzer '81, former New York governor
- Elena Kagan '81, United States Supreme Court justice
- Nan Hayworth '81, former U.S. representative for New York's 19th congressional district
- Chris Lu '88, United States Deputy Secretary of Labor
- Nuala O'Connor '89, current president of the Center for Democracy and Technology and inaugural Chief Privacy Officer for the US Department of Homeland Security
- Charles W. Yost '28, U.S. ambassador to Laos, Syria, Morocco, and U.S. ambassador to the United Nations

=== Sport ===
- Frank Anger '61, member of the United States team in Fencing at the Summer Olympics in Tokyo in 1962
- Derek Bouchard-Hall '92, former professional cyclist, competitor in the men's team pursuit in Cycling at the 2000 Summer Olympics, and current CEO and president of USA Cycling
- Danika Holbrook '95, competitor for the United States in Rowing at the 2004 Summer Olympics - Women's quadruple sculls
- Morgan Crooks '98, competitor for Canada in Rowing at the 2000 Summer Olympics
- Chris Ahrens '98, gold medalist in the Men's Eights event in Rowing at the 2004 Summer Olympics
- Thomas Herschmiller '01, silver medalist for Canada in Rowing at the 2004 Summer Olympics
- Paul Teti '01, three-time member of the United States Olympic rowing team
- Lia Pernell '03, competitor for the United States in Rowing at the 2008 Summer Olympics
- Juan Pablo Valdivieso '04, two-time member of Peru's Olympic swimming team
- Samuel Loch '06, Australian rower who competed in the 2008 Summer Olympics and 2012 Summer Olympics
- Steven Coppola '06, bronze medalist for the United States in Rowing at the 2008 Summer Olympics - Men's eight
- Caroline Lind '06, two-time Olympic gold medalist for the United States in Women's rowing
- Genevra Stone '07, six-time winner of the women's championship singles event at Head of the Charles Regatta and competitor for the United States in Rowing at the 2012 Summer Olympics - Women's single sculls
- Glenn Ochal '08, bronze medalist for the United States in Rowing at the 2012 Summer Olympics - Men's coxless four
- Douglas Lennox-Silva '09, swimmer who represented Puerto Rico in the 2008 Summer Olympics
- Sara Hendershot '10, representative of the United States in Rowing at the 2012 Summer Olympics
- Robin Prendes '11, representative of the United States in Rowing at the 2012 Summer Olympics in the men's coxless four
- Bryan Tay '12, Singapore's sole representative in men's Swimming at the 2008 Summer Olympics
- Susie Scanlan '14, American epee fencer who won a bronze medal in the 2012 Summer Olympics
- Nick Mead '17, gold medalist for the United States in Rowing at the 2024 Summer Olympics - Men's coxless four
