= Cap and Gown Club =

Eating club at Princeton University

- U.S. Historic district – Contributing property
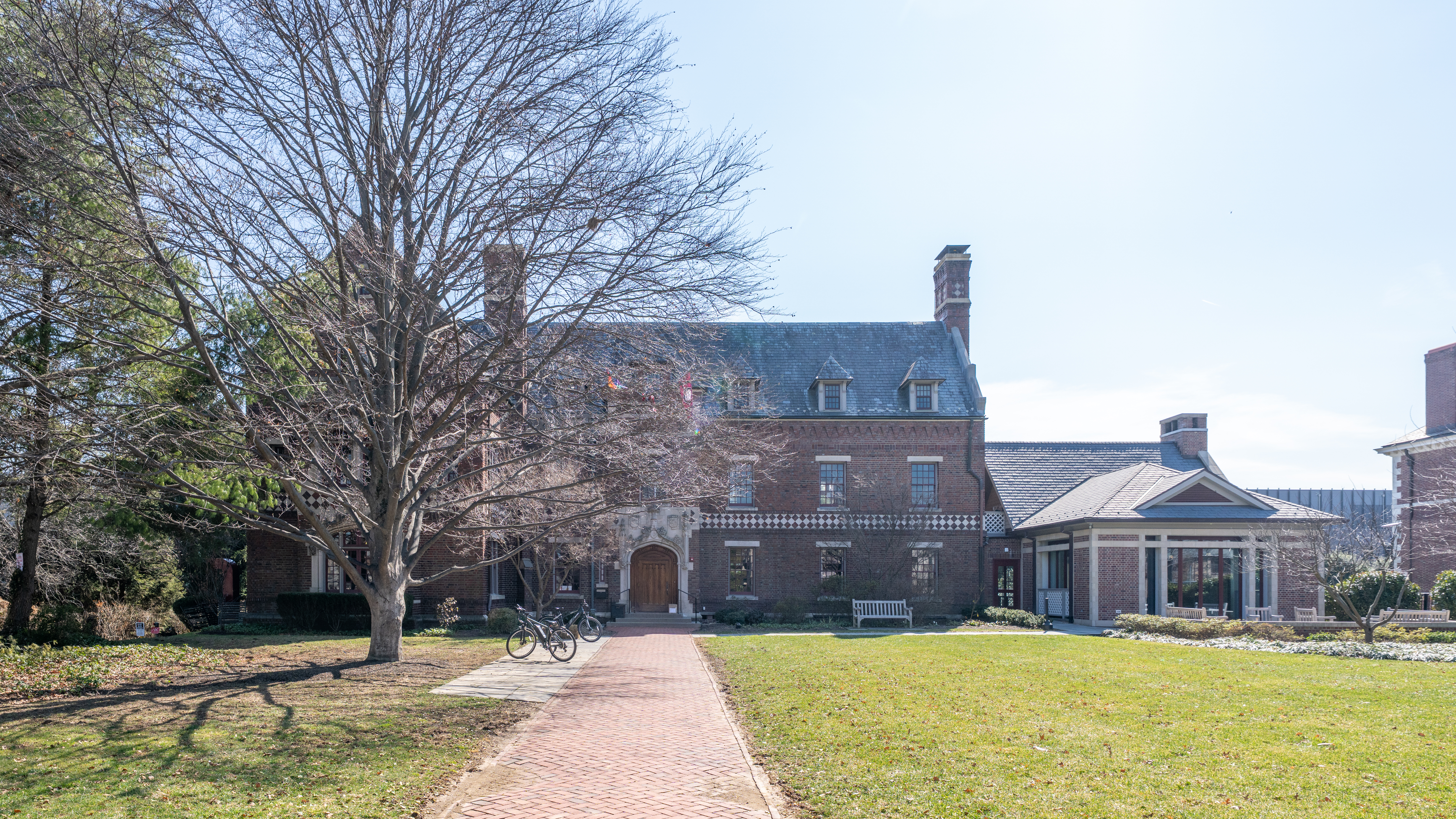

- Location within Mercer County, New Jersey Location within New Jersey Location within the United States
- Location: 61 Prospect Ave, Princeton, New Jersey
- Coordinates: 40°20′53.9″N 74°39′03.6″W
- Built: 1908
- Architect: Raleigh C. Gildersleeve
- Architectural style: Norman Gothic revival
- Part of: Princeton Historic District (ID75001143)
- Added to NRHP: 27 June 1975

Cap and Gown Club, founded in 1891, is an eating club at Princeton University, in Princeton, New Jersey, United States. Colloquially known as "Cap", the club is one of the "Big Four" eating clubs at Princeton (the others are The Ivy Club, University Cottage Club, and Tiger Inn). Members are selected through a selective process called bicker. Sometimes known as "the Illustrious Cap and Gown Club," it was the first of the currently selective eating clubs to accept women. Though personalities of eating clubs certainly change throughout the years, Cap and Gown is described in F. Scott Fitzgerald's This Side of Paradise as "anti-alcoholic, faintly religious and politically powerful."

Cap was the most bickered eating club in 2011, 2013, 2014, and 2015. It has been the most selective club since 2013, with 287 students bickering in Spring 2019, thirty-five percent of whom were offered membership.

== History ==
Cap is located at 61 Prospect Avenue between Cloister Inn and the University Cottage Club. It is the only Princeton eating club to have stayed in the same geographic location for its entire existence. Three Cap clubhouses have occupied this location. The first was completed in 1892. In 1895 when the club outgrew this clubhouse, the structure was moved across the street, and William Ralph Emerson was commissioned to design the second clubhouse (completed in 1896). Ten years later, Cap was ready to expand again. The Emerson building was moved away, and Raleigh Gildersleeve designed the clubhouse that Cap still occupies today. A major renovation and expansion of the clubhouse to increase the size of the clubhouse in step with its growing membership was completed in February 2011.

On December 9, 2020, the Cap and Gown Club Board of Trustees unanimously approved a new financial aid policy that provides a grant to every member on Princeton University financial aid, guaranteeing that no member on full financial aid pays any out-of-pocket costs for club membership.

Notable Cap and Gown alumni include Dean Cain '88, Brooke Shields '87, and Donald Rumsfeld '54. Neurosurgeon Wilder Penfield, who pioneered the concept of the brain homunculus, was also a member of Cap and Gown.
