= Cannon Dial Elm Club =

Eating club at Princeton University

- U.S. Historic district – Contributing property
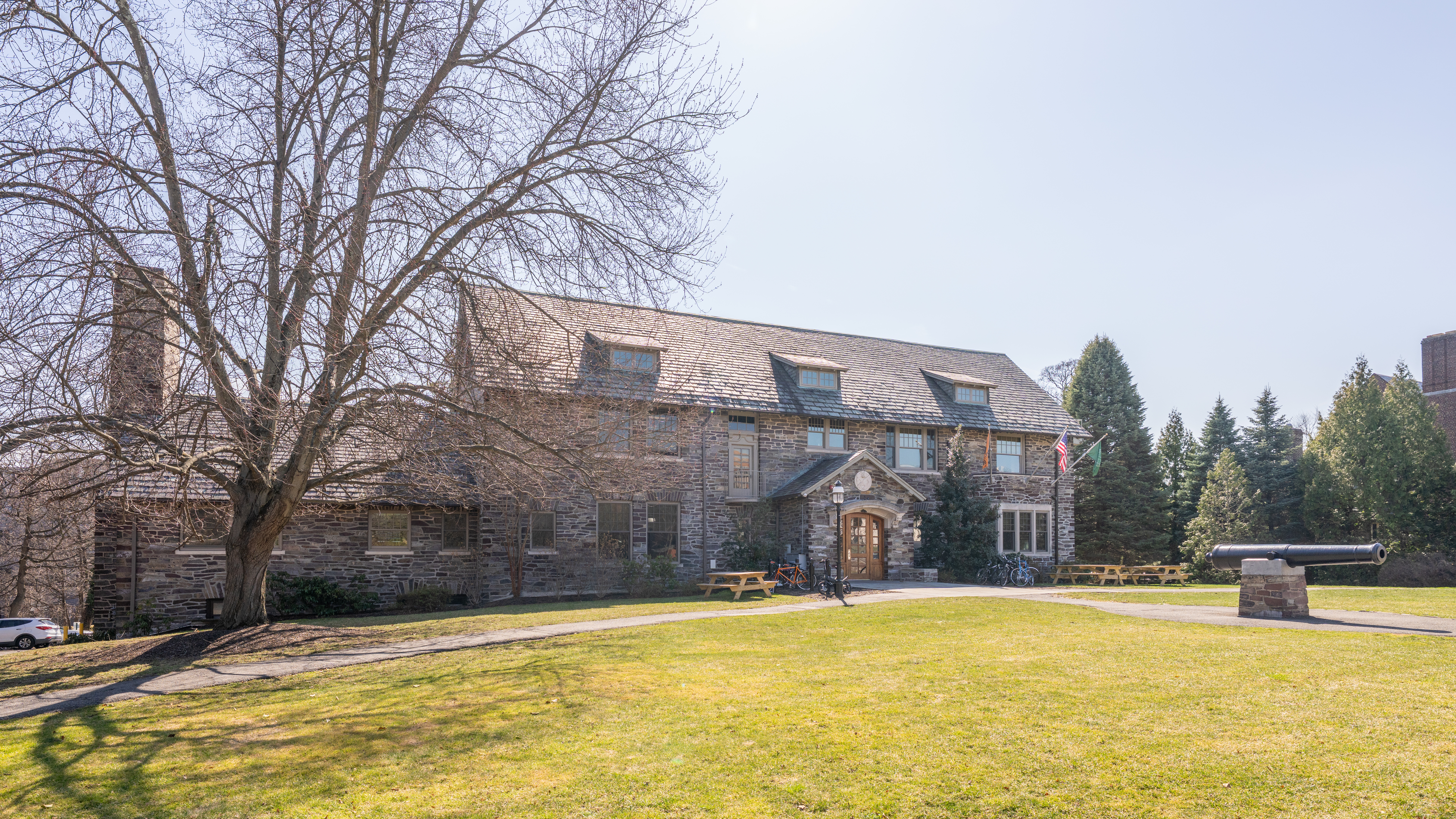

- Location within Mercer County, New Jersey Location within New Jersey Location within the United States
- Location: 21 Prospect Ave, Princeton, New Jersey
- Coordinates: 40°20′52.1″N 74°39′12.1″W
- Built: 1910
- Architect: Edgar Viguers Seeler
- Architectural style: Collegiate Gothic
- Part of: Princeton Historic District (ID75001143)
- Added to NRHP: 27 June 1975

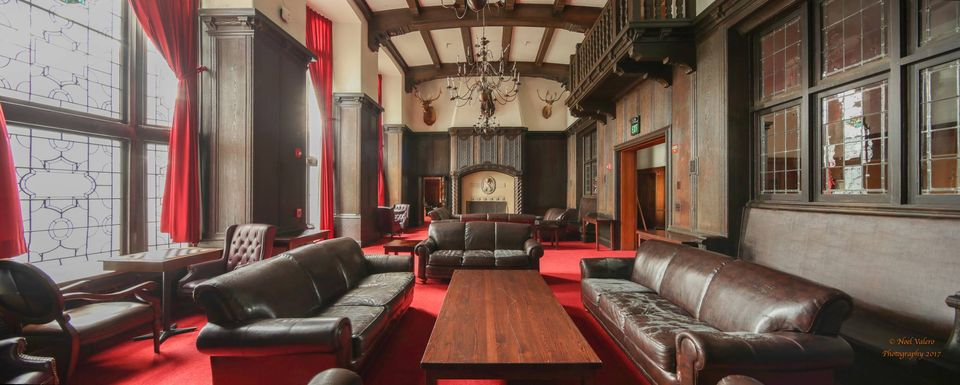
Crane Room

Cannon Dial Elm Club, also known as Cannon Club, is one of the historic Eating Clubs at Princeton University. Founded in 1895, it completed its current clubhouse in 1910. The club closed in the early 1970s and later merged with Dial Lodge and Elm Club to form Dial, Elm, Cannon (DEC), which closed its doors in 1998. In 2011 DEC reopened, now bearing the name Cannon Dial Elm Club, using its historic clubhouse, which had served as the home for the Office of Population Research during the club's hiatus.

== History ==
=== Founding ===
The Eating Clubs play a central role in the history and life of Princeton University, serving as the primary place of dining and social life for more than 70% of upperclassmen. Cannon Club was founded in 1895 and housed in a small house on William Street that had been home to Tiger Inn for the previous two years. From 1896 to 1899 it was located in the "Incubator" a small house, at that time on Olden Street, that served as an early home to many of the Eating Clubs as they established themselves and sought to build clubhouses. In 1899, Cannon Club purchased the Osborn House that stood on the south side of Prospect Avenue, between the McCosh and West residences. That home fell into disrepair by 1908 and Edgar Viguers Seeler, a prominent Philadelphia architect, was commissioned to build a new clubhouse. That Collegiate Gothic clubhouse, completed in 1910, was the first of the clubs to make use of local stone. While the facade has been described as plain in comparison with other clubs, the rear elevation and interiors have been praised, with the two-story living room considered one of the finest interior spaces found on Prospect. The eponymous cannon sits in front of the clubhouse, pointed at Prospect Avenue. President-elect Woodrow Wilson, on a last stroll before departing for Washington, commented to reporters: "Hardly a chummy entrance that!"

=== Closure ===
The early 1970s saw a fall in membership, ultimately precipitating the closure of the clubhouse. The property came into the possession of the university, which spent 3/4 of a million dollars on renovations and deferred maintenance to turn the clubhouse into an academic building, Notestein Hall, which housed the Office of Population Research for over 30 years.

=== Reopening ===
Despite the closure of the club, Cannon Club continued as a graduate board determined to continue the club's traditions and see it one day reopened. In 1989, Cannon merged with the financially imperiled Dial Lodge, and the combined entity was joined by Elm Club the following year. The stated goal of the new Dial Elm Cannon Club (DEC) was to exchange the Dial and Elm clubhouses for the old Cannon Club. In 1997, an agreement was reached to exchange Dial and Elm for the Cannon clubhouse and $2 million. The club was unable to reopen Cannon at that time but retained the option to purchase the building. This led to the second demise of the club with periodic claims that Cannon would reopen, a feat accomplished in 2011.

== Notable alumni ==
- Robert Baldwin — Chairman of Morgan Stanley, Under Secretary of the Navy (1965-1967)
- Mark Milley — Chairman of the Joint Chiefs of Staff, Chief of Staff of the Army
- The Hon. Paul Sarbanes — US House of Representatives (1971-77) and US Senator (1977-2007)
- Norman Augustine — Chairman and CEO of Lockheed Martin, Under Secretary of the Army (1975-1977), Chairman of the Augustine Spaceflight Committee
- Christopher Eisgruber - President of Princeton University
- Malcolm Forbes - Publisher of Forbes Magazine, New Jersey State Representative
- Bill Haarlow — President of Chemicals Division of Quaker Oats Company and later owner
- Art Hyland — Secretary/editor of NCAA Basketball Rules Committee
- Jim Morgan — President & CEO of Philip Morris USA, CEO of Atari
- John "Rocky" Barrett — Chairman of the Citizen Potawatomi Nation
- Frank Biondi — CEO of HBO, Universal Pictures, and Viacom; Trustee of Princeton University
- Jay Higgins — Vice Chairman of Salomon Brothers, Owner of Waterville Golf Links
- Mike O’Neill — Chairman of CitiGroup, CEO of Barclays, CEO of the Bank of Hawaii.
- John F. Kennedy - 35th President of the United States, U.S. Senator^
- James Billington — 13th Librarian of Congress (1987-2015)
- Thomas Christie — Chief Operating Officer of Showtime Networks Inc
- Karl Chandler — (ret) NFL Football player, NY Giants & Detroit Lions
- Karen Smyers — Three time World Champion, Three time Ironman Champion
- John C. Bogle — Founder and chief executive of The Vanguard Group
- Stan Rubin — Conductor, The Stan Rubin Orchestra
- Robert Caro — Lyndon Johnson and Robert Moses biographer, Two time Pulitzer Prize winner and National Humanities Medal Recipient
- Michelle Obama - Former First Lady, Author, Philanthropist^
- Frank Stella — Painter & Sculptor, National Medal of Arts Recipient
- John Streicker — Chairman of Sentinel Real Estate Corporation
- Bradford L. Smith — President & Chief Legal Officer of Microsoft, Princeton University Trustee
- Katherine Brittain Bradley — Founder and President of the CityBridge Foundation, Princeton University Trustee
- Steve Papa — Founder of CEO Endeca, Founder and Chairman of Parallel Wireless
- Gerhard Andlinger - Andlinger Centers namesake and business executive

^denotes honorary members
