= Hypnerotomachia Poliphili =

1499 book by Francesco Colonna

The Strife of Love in a Dream
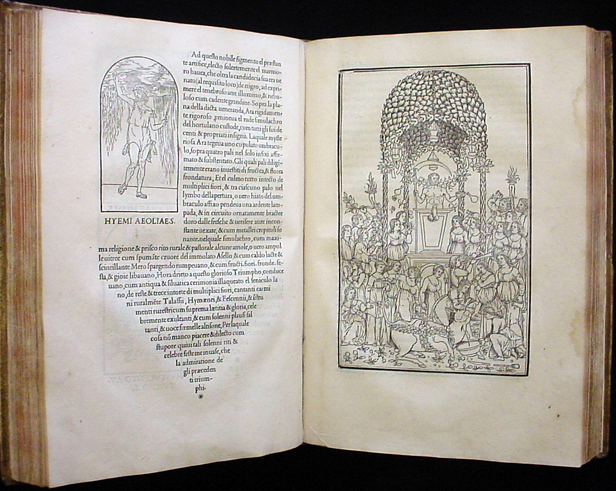
- First edition
- Author: Francesco Colonna
- Original title: Hypnerotomachia Poliphili, ubi humana omnia non nisi somnium esse docet. Atque obiter plurima scitu sane quam digna commemorat.
- Translator: Joscelyn Godwin
- Language: Italian / Latin
- Genre: Romance, allegorical fantasy
- Publisher: Aldus Manutius
- Publication date: 1499
- Publication place: Italy
- English publication date: 1999
- Media type: Print

Hypnerotomachia Poliphili (/hiːpˌnɛəroʊtəˈmɑːkiːə pəˈliːfəˌliː/; from Ancient Greek ὕπνος (hýpnos) 'sleep', ἔρως (érōs) 'love' and μάχη (máchē) 'fight'), called in English Poliphilo's Strife of Love in a Dream or The Dream of Poliphilus, is a book attributed to the 15th-century Italian monk Francesco Colonna. Hypnerotomachia Poliphili presents a mysterious arcane allegory in which the main protagonist, Poliphilo, pursues his love, Polia, through a dreamlike landscape. In the end, he is reconciled with her by the "Fountain of Venus".

It is a famous example of an incunable (a work of early printing). The work was first published in 1499 in Venice by Aldus Manutius as a sort of graphic novel. This first edition has an elegant page layout, with refined woodcut illustrations in an Early Renaissance style. The Aldine Press issued a second edition after the death of Aldus.

== History ==
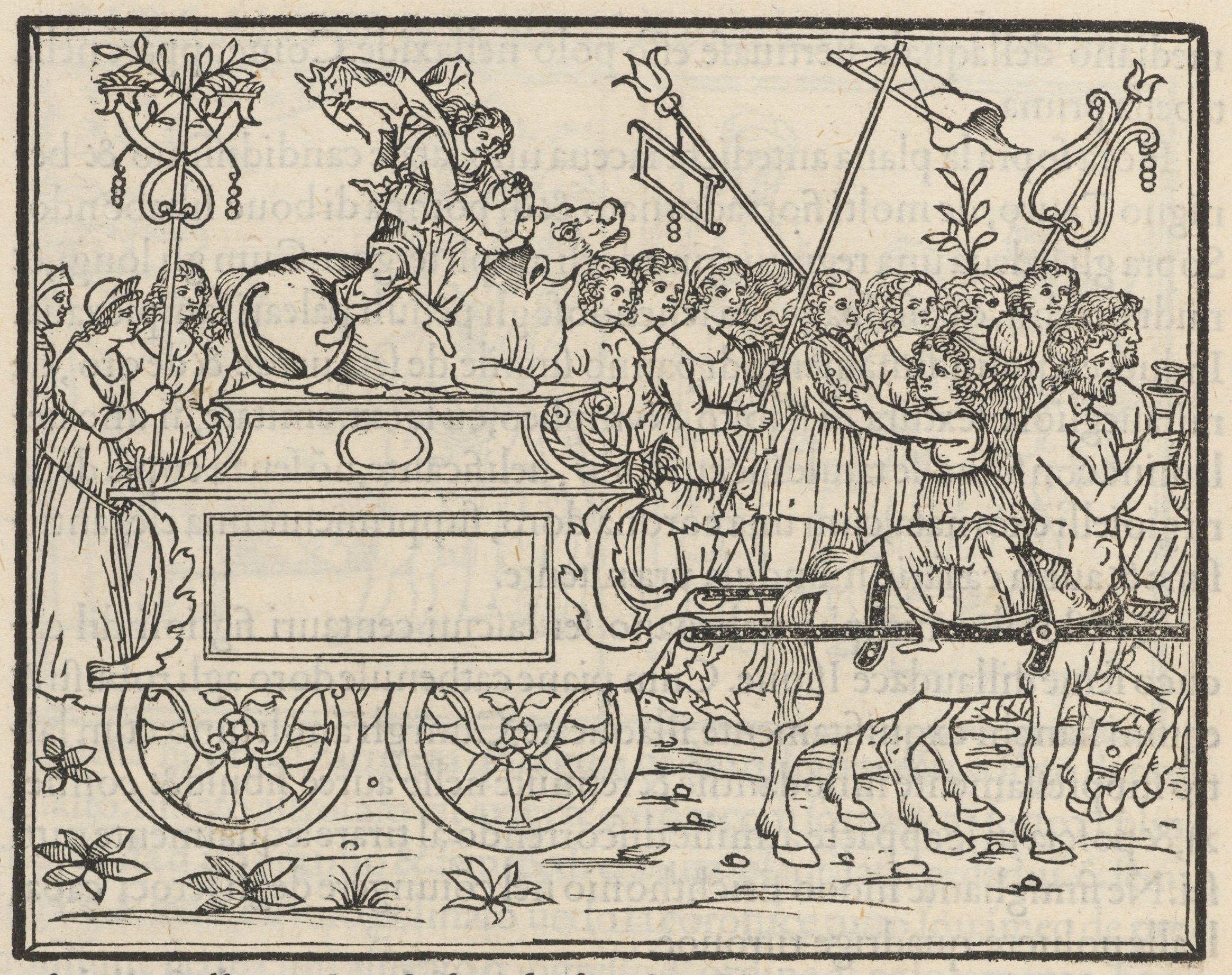
Triumphal Car

The Hypnerotomachia Poliphili was printed by Aldus Manutius in Venice in December 1499. The author of the book is anonymous. An acrostic formed by the first, elaborately decorated letter in each chapter reads "POLIAM FRATER FRANCISCVS COLVMNA PERAMAVIT" 'Brother Francesco Colonna has dearly loved Polia'. Despite this clue, the book has also been attributed to Leon Battista Alberti, and earlier, to Lorenzo de' Medici. Manutius himself claimed that the author was a different Francesco Colonna, a wealthy Roman governor. The identity of the illustrator has at times been attributed to Benedetto Montagna, and Sandro Botticelli.

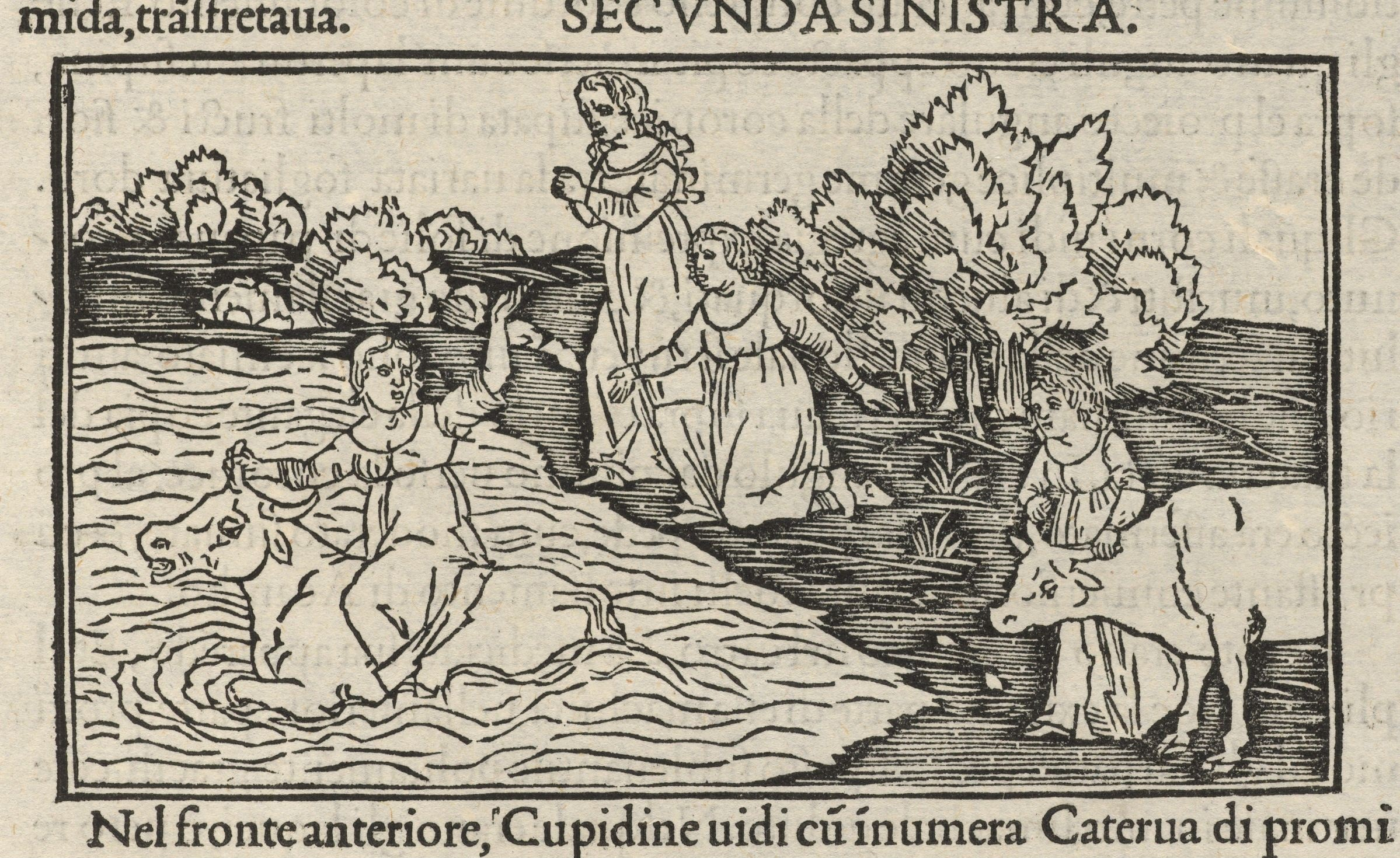
The Rape of Europa

The subject matter of the book lies within the tradition (or genre) of the Romance. It follows the conventions of courtly love, which in 1499 continued to provide engaging thematic matter for the Quattrocento aristocrats. The Hypnerotomachia Poliphili also draws from Renaissance humanism where arcane writings are a demonstration of classical thought.

The text of the book is written in a bizarre Latinate Italian. Without explanation, the text is full of words based on Latin and Greek roots. The book, however, also includes words from the Italian language and illustrations which include Arabic and Hebrew words. Moreover, Colonna would invent new forms of language when those available to him were inaccurate. The book also contains some uses of Egyptian hieroglyphs, but they are not authentic. Most of them have been drawn from a late antique text of dubious origin called Hieroglyphica.

The Hypnerotomachia Poliphili, set in 1467, consists of a series of precious and elaborate scenes involving the title character, Poliphilo ("friend of many things" from the Greek words poly- meaning "many" and philos meaning "friend"). In these scenes, Poliphilo wanders a bucolic-classical dreamland in search of his love, Polia ("many things"). The author's style is elaborately descriptive and unsparing in its use of superlatives. The text makes frequent references to classical geography and mythology, mostly by way of comparison.

The book has long been sought after as one of the most beautiful incunabula ever printed. The typography is famous for its quality and clarity. Its roman typeface, cut by Francesco Griffo, is a revised version of a type which Aldus had first used in 1496 for the De Aetna of Pietro Bembo. The type is thought to be one of the first examples of the roman typeface, and in incunabula, it is unique to the Aldine Press. The type was revived by the Monotype Corporation in 1923 as "Poliphilus". In 1929, Stanley Morison directed another revival of the earlier version of Griffo's type. It was called "Bembo".

The Hypnerotomachia Poliphili is illustrated with 168 woodcuts showing the scenery, architectural settings, and some of the characters Poliphilo encounters in his dreams. They depict scenes from Poliphilo's adventures and the architectural features over which the author rhapsodizes, in a stark and ornate line art style.

The illustrations are interesting because they shed light on the Renaissance man's taste in the æsthetic qualities of Greek and Roman antiquities. In the United States, a book on the life and works of Aldus Manutius by Helen Barolini was set within pages that reproduce all the illustrations and many of the full pages from the original work, reconstructing the original layout.

The psychologist Carl Jung admired the book, believing the dream images presaged his theory of archetypes. The style of the woodcut illustrations had a great influence on late nineteenth century English illustrators, such as Aubrey Beardsley, Walter Crane, and Robert Anning Bell.

== Translations ==
A French translation or rather adaptation appeared in the 1540s.

In 1592, in a London edition, "R. D." (who is believed to be Robert Dallington) partially translated the Hypnerotomachia Poliphili. Here, it was given its best known English title, The Strife of Love in a Dream. In 1999, a first complete English translation by musicologist Joscelyn Godwin was published. However his translation uses standard, modern language, rather than following the original text's pattern of coining and borrowing words.

Since the 500th anniversary in 1999, several other modern translations have been published. These include a translation into modern Italian as part of the (volume 1: fac-simile; volume 2: translation, introductory essays and more than 700 pages of commentary) edition by Marco Ariani and Mino Gabriele; into Spanish by Pilar Pedraza Martínez; into Dutch with one volume of commentary by Ike Cialona; into German, with commentary inserted into the text, by Thomas Reiser; and partly into Polish by Anna Klimkiewicz.

A complete Russian translation by the art historian Boris Sokolov is now in progress, of which the "Cythera Island" part was published in 2005 and is available online. The book is planned as a precise reconstruction of the original layout, with Cyrillic types and typography by Sergei Egorov.

Ten of the monuments described in the Hypnerotomachia were reconstructed with computer graphics and were first published by Esteban A. Cruz in 2006 and in 2012. In 2007, Cruz established a full, design-study project Formas Imaginisque Poliphili, an ongoing independent research project with the objective of reconstructing the content of the Hypnerotomachia Poliphili, through a multi-disciplinary approach, and with the aid of virtual and traditional reconstruction technology and methods.

== Plot summary ==
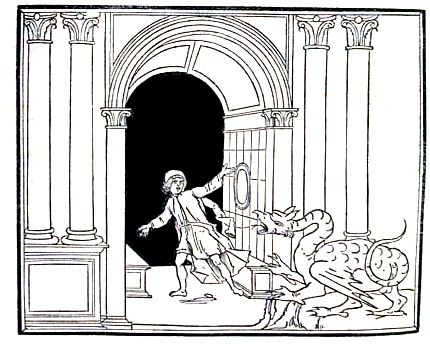
Poliphilo from a page of the Hypnerotomachia Poliphili

The book begins with Poliphilo, who is spending a restless dream-filled night because his beloved, Polia, has shunned him. Poliphilo is transported into a wild forest, where he becomes lost, encounters dragons, wolves and maidens and a large variety of architectural forms. He escapes, and falls asleep once more.

He then awakens in a second dream, a dream within the first. He is taken by nymphs to meet their queen, and there he is asked to declare his love for Polia, which he does. He is then directed by two nymphs to three gates. He chooses the third, and there he discovers his beloved. They are taken by some more nymphs to a temple to be engaged. Along the way they come across five triumphal processions celebrating their union. They are then taken to the island of Cythera by barge, on which Cupid is the boatswain. On Cythera, they see another triumphal procession celebrating their union. The narrative is interrupted, and assumed by a second voice, as Polia describes Poliphilo's erotomania from her own point of view.

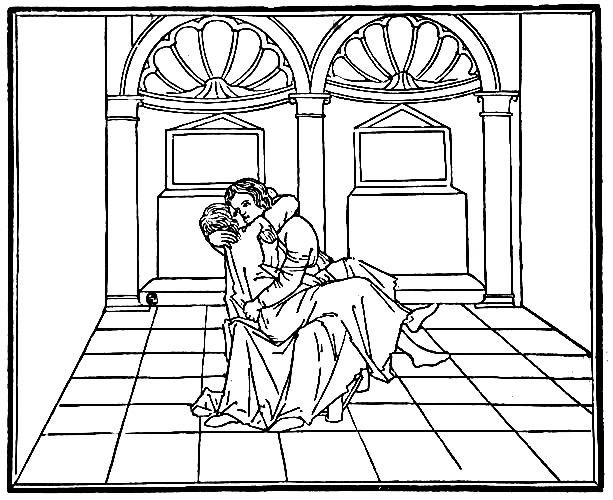
Polia kisses Poliphilo back to life

Poliphilo then resumes his narrative (from one-fifth of the way through the book). Polia rejects Poliphilo, but Cupid appears to her in a vision and compels her to return and kiss Poliphilo, who has fallen into a deathlike swoon at her feet. Her kiss revives him. Venus blesses their love, and Poliphilo and Polia are united at last. As Poliphilo is about to take Polia into his arms, Polia vanishes into thin air and Poliphilo wakes up.

== Gallery ==
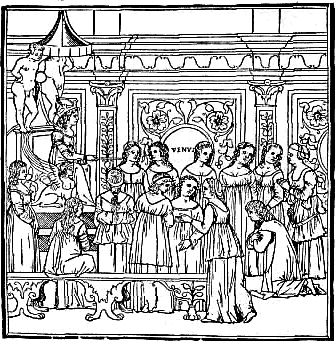
Poliphilo kneels before Queen Eleuterylida

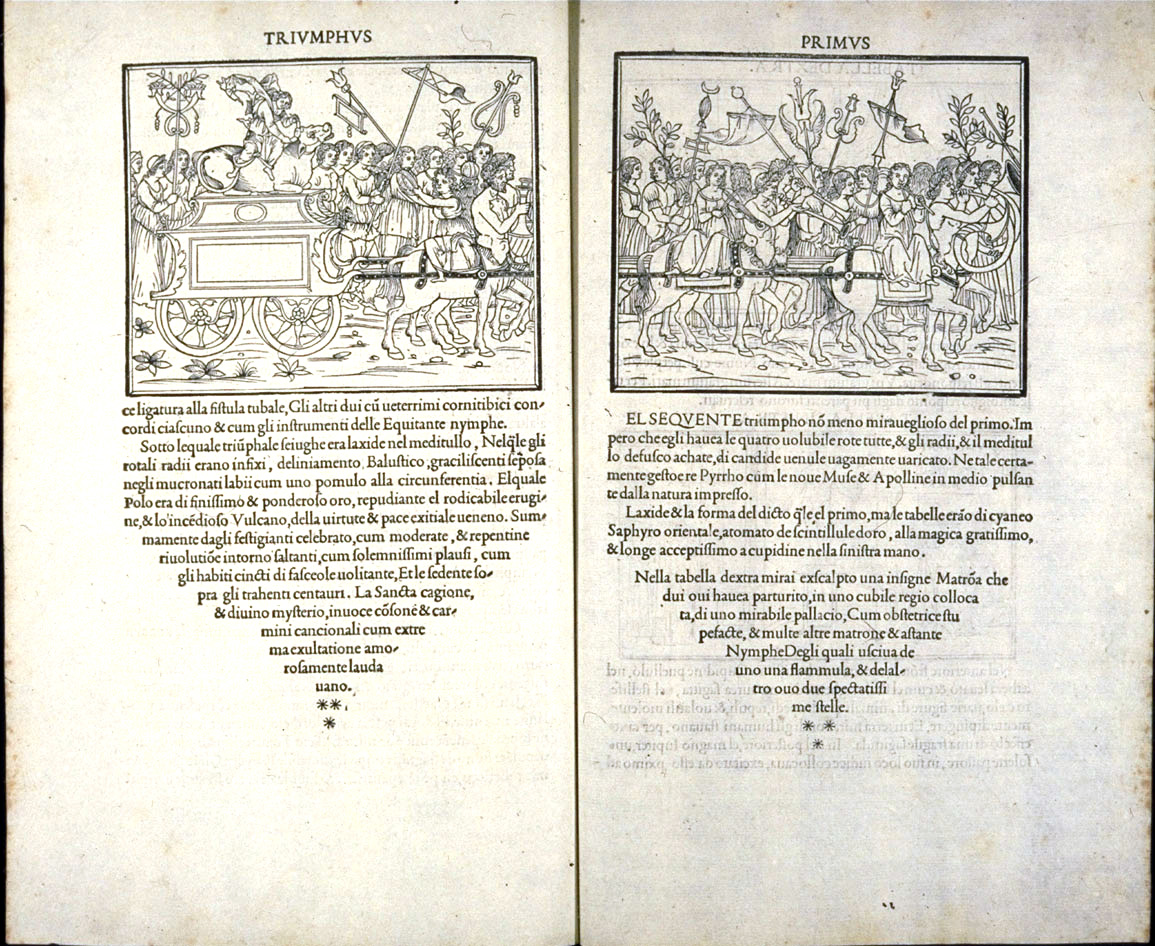
Two pages of the Hypnerotomachia Poliphili

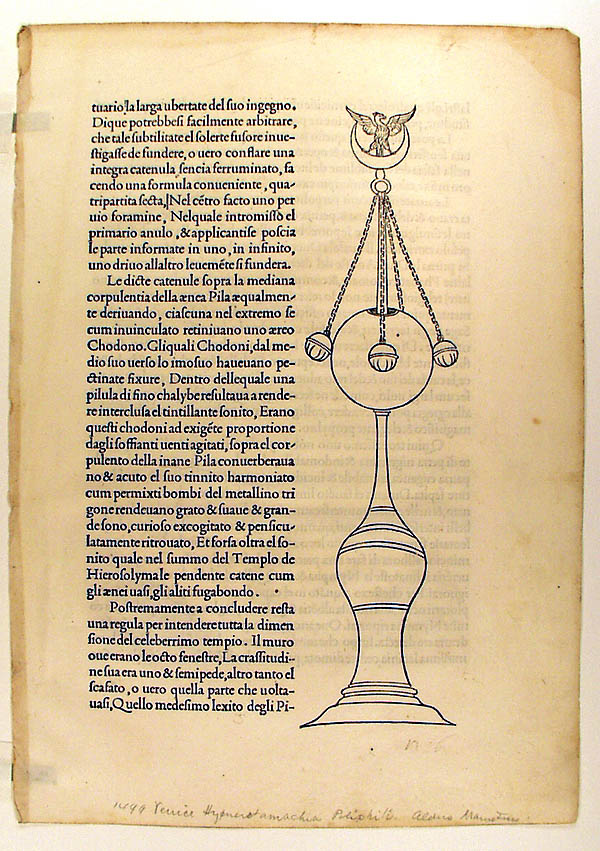
Page of the Hypnerotomachia Poliphili

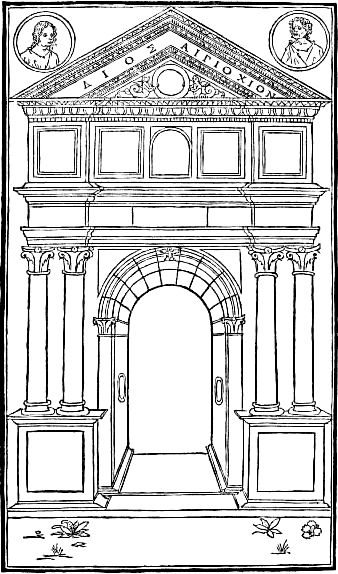
Magna Porta

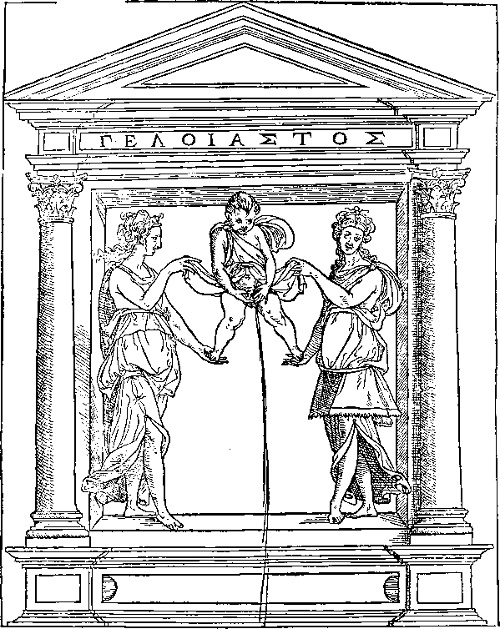
Fountain of a puer mingens

== In other works ==
- Liane Lefaivre and other scholars regard the 16th century Gardens of Bomarzo to be illustrations of the Hypnerotomachia Poliphili.
- The German composer Alexander Moosbrugger took the text of his 2021 opera Wind, staging the search of Poliphilo for Polia, from the Hypnerotomachia's German translation by Thomas Reiser and the English one by Joscelyn Godwin.
- In Umberto Eco's The Mysterious Flame of Queen Loana, the protagonist has written a diploma thesis about the Hypnerotomachia Poliphili.
- In the novel The Rule of Four by Ian Caldwell and Dustin Thomason the protagonists decode hidden meanings in the Hypnerotomachia Poliphili.
