= Liber colorum secundum magistrum Bernardum =

13th century art treatise

The Liber colorum secundum magistrum Bernardum ('Book of Colours according to master Bernard') is a medieval treatise on miniature painting and book illumination. Written in a Medieval Latin interspersed with several expressions in the Italian Lombard dialect it stems from 13th century Northern Italy. The eponymous magister Bernardus (or 'master Bernard') was most likely a cleric working in a scriptorium to whom later collections also attribute further artisanal instructions not related to book painting. It is contained within four manuscripts:

- Biblioteca Ambrosiana (Milan, Italy), ms. D 437 inf. (16th century)
- Bodleian Library (Oxford, England), ms. Canonici Misc. 128 (16th century)
- Biblioteca Estense (Modena, Italy), ms. T.7.3 (15th/16th century)
- Beinecke Rare Book & Manuscript Library (New Haven, United States), MS 986 Insegnamento per pictori ed doratori: artist's manual (ca. 1440)

== Content ==
The original corpus ascribed to 'master Bernard' himself amounts to 56 recipes. These treat:

- the gilding of parchment
- reds from Indian Redwood
- green earths and copper Greens
- lac (resin) and cinnabar reds
- azurite blues
- blues from woad (Isatis tinctoria)
- pinks
- orpiment
- minium reds
- whites from lime and lead white
- 'silverblue' (misnamed due to the high content of copper in medieval silver)
- blends for flesh colours and clothes
- mosaic gold (‘purpurina’ or 'porporina'), one of the earliest European descriptions predating Cennino Cennini's Libro dell'arte from the 1420ties

== Editions and translations ==
The Liber colorum was first published, based on three manuscripts, with a translation into Italian and a commentary by the Milanese conservationist Paola Travaglio in 2008, followed by a 2016 re-edition after the discovery of a fourth textual witness. In 2023 Travaglio and Thomas Reiser published a German version with an expanded commentary.

- Paola Travaglio, Il Liber colorum secundum magistrum Bernardum quomodo debent distemperari et temperari et confici, Un inedito trattato duecentesco di miniatura, in: Quaderni dell’Abbazia, Fondazione Abbatia Sancte Marie de Morimundo e Museo 15 (2008), pp. 2–41.
- Paola Travaglio, Il Liber colorum secundum magistrum Bernardum, Un trattato duecentesco di miniatura, in: Studi di Memofonte 16 (2016), pp. 149-195.
- Paola Travaglio and Thomas Reiser, Der ‚Liber colorum secundum magistrum Bernardum’, Ein Maltraktat des 13. Jahrhunderts, Neuedition, Übersetzung und Kommentar, Marktredwitz 2023, 64 pages. ISBN 979-8-8599-25766
