= Robert Dallington =

English courtier, travel writer and translator

Sir Robert Dallington (1561–1637) was an English courtier, travel writer and translator. In his final years, he was master of the London Charterhouse, a charitable foundation which ran a school and an almshouse.

== Life ==
Dallington was born at Geddington, Northamptonshire. He entered Corpus Christi College, Cambridge, and was there from about 1575 to 1580; from his incorporation at Oxford as M.A. it is deduced that he held that degree from Cambridge, though this is unrecorded. Dallington then became a schoolmaster in Norfolk. The Puritan Norfolk family of Butts acted as patrons at this period of his life.

In 1594, he contributed a gratulatory poem to Lewes Lewkenor's The Resolved Gentleman. After a few years, Dallington set out on a leisurely journey through France and Italy: a Grand Tour, and in fact the first of two, one in 1595 to 1597, followed by another in 1598 to 1600. On his return he became secretary to Francis Manners; they had been in Italy together on the second tour, and the party then may have included the young Inigo Jones. The first tour was with Roger Manners, 5th Earl of Rutland, elder brother of Francis.

Dallington was from 1605 a gentleman of the privy chamber in ordinary to Henry Frederick, Prince of Wales (on the recommendation of the Earl of Rutland) and in receipt of a pension of £100. Anthony Wood says that he filled the same office in Prince Charles's household. In 1624, on Prince Charles's recommendation, Dallington was appointed master of Charterhouse in succession to Francis Beaumont. Dallington was perhaps not an obvious candidate for the post. As early as 1601 Dallington had been incorporated at St. John's College, Oxford; but though he was now forty years-old he was still only in deacon's orders, and at the same time the governors resolved that no future master should be elected under forty years of age, or who was not in holy orders of priesthood two years before his election, and having not more than one living, and that within thirty miles of London.

He was knighted on 30 December 1624. While master, Dallington improved the walks and gardens of Charterhouse, and introduced into the school the custom of versifying on passages of scriptures. In 1636 Dallington had grown so infirm that the governors appointed three persons to assist him in his duties of master. In the following year he died, seventy-six years old.

Two years before his death Dallington had, at his own expense, built a schoolhouse in his native village, Geddington; he also gave the great bell of the parish church and provided for the poor.

== Works ==
While occupying a teaching position he edited and published A Booke of Epitaphes made upon the Death of Sir William Buttes (by R. D. and others, edited by R. D.). Eight of these epitaphs, some in English, the others in poor Latin verse, were composed by Dallington himself. He is believed to be the R. D. who translated into English the Hypnerotomachia Poliphili of Francesco Colonna. Roy Strong regards the connection of Dallington with the court of Prince Henry as significant as a filiation of Italianate taste.

He wrote an account of his travels. A Survey of the Great Duke's State of Tuscany, in the yeare of our Lord 1596, which appeared in 1605, and was followed the next year by A Method for Travell: shewed by taking the view of France as it stoode in the yeare of our Lord 1598. Both of these volumes are travelogues-cum-guide-books, the first being a particularly sophisticated critique of the Medici regime, concluding with the punning motto: 'qui sub Medici vivit, misere vivit'.

In addition to the works mentioned above, Dallington published in 1613 a book with a title relating to the Italian historian Guicciardini, Aphorismes Civill and Militarie, amplified with authorities, and exemplified with historie out of the first Quaterne of F. Guicciardine (a briefe inference upon Guicciardine's digression, in the fourth part of the first Quaterne of his Historie, forbidden the impression and effaced out of the originall by the Inquisition). A second edition of this book contained a translation of the inhibited digression.
