= Thomas Reiser =

German philologist and translator

- Born: 1979 (age 46–47); Bayreuth, Germany
- Occupations: philologist, translator

Thomas Reiser (born 1979 in Bayreuth, Germany) is a German philologist and translator. His contributions range from Baroque alchemy to comedies and art technological treatises of classical antiquity as well as of the Italian Renaissance. In 2014, he saw to the first German translation of Francesco Colonna’s Hypnerotomachia Poliphili.

== Life and career ==
Thomas Reiser studied German Medieval Literature, Italian and Latin at LMU Munich and Heidelberg University. There he also obtained his doctoral degree in 2009 with the edition, translation and commentary of the mytho-alchemical didactic epic Chryseidos Libri IIII by the physician and alchemist Johannes Nicolaus Furichius (1602–1633) from Strasbourg. He then held postdoctoral scholarships at the Centre Tedesco di Studi Veneziani in Venice and 2010 at the Zentralinstitut für Kunstgeschichte in Munich. In 2014, he provided the first German translation of Francesco Colonna’s Hypnerotomachia Poliphili (Venice 1499), which the Austrian composer Alexander Moosbrugger (with extracts from the English version by Joscelyn Godwin) turned into the libretto of his opera Wind; premiered at the Bregenz Festival, Lake Constance, and first aired in 2021. As a fellow at the Casa di Goethe museum in Rome (2016 and 2017), Reiser rendered Andrea Palladio’s guides to the city’s ancient monuments and churches into German. In the same year, he was awarded a scholarship for a new translation of Bernardo Dovizi da Bibbiena’s (1470–1520) comedy La Calandria (1513) by the Viennese publishing house Schultz & Schirm Bühnenverlag. Reiser further worked, as Gerda Henkel fellow in 2016 on Julius Pollux and as Volkswagen Foundation fellow on the architectural theory of the Italian Renaissance from 2018 to 2019, at the Section for Conservation and Restoration Studies of the TUM School of Engineering and Design in Munich. In 2024, he held a research fellowship related to the Liber colorum secundum magistrum Bernardum at Durham University.

== Publications (selected) ==
Monographs

- together with Paola Travaglio, Der Liber colorum secundum magistrum Bernardum Ein Maltraktat des 13. Jahrhunderts, Neuedition, Übersetzung und Kommentar, Marktredwitz 2023, ISBN 979-8-8599-2576-6.
- Francesco Colonna: Hypnerotomachia Poliphili, Interlinearkommentarfassung. Translated and commented by Thomas Reiser, Breitenbrunn 2014, series: Theon Lykos (ed. by Uta Schedler) Ia. ISBN 978-1-4992-0611-1.
- Mythologie und Alchemie in der Lehrepik des frühen 17. Jahrhunderts, Die Chryseidos libri IIII des Straßburger Dichterarztes Johannes Nicolaus Furichius (1602–1633). De Gruyter, Berlin / New York 2011, ISBN 978-3-11-023316-2.

Articles and Book Chapters

- Lexical Notes to Francesco Colonna’s ‘Hypnerotomachia Poliphili’ (1499) – Cruces, Contradictions, Contributions, in: Lexis. Poetica, retorica e comunicazione nella tradizione classica 33 (2015), pp. 490–525.
- Techniken des Raumdekors. Interpretationen von Vitruv 7, 1-4. Von Palladius zu Palladio, in: Firmitas et Splendor. Vitruv und die Techniken des Wanddekors. Ed. by Erwin Emmerling, Andreas Grüner, et al., Munich 2014, series: Studien aus dem Lehrstuhl für Restaurierung, Technische Universität München, Fakultät für Architektur, pp. 225–297. ISBN 978-3-935643-62-7 (online).
- Das Kalklöschen nach antiken und rinascimentalen Materietheorien. Anmerkungen zu Vitruv 2, 2 und 2, 5. Von Cesariano und Barbaro zur Fehde Scaligers mit Cardano, in: ibid, pp. 299–319.
- St. Kajetan’s of Munich “Main Altar of 1675” in the Year 1675, in: Regnum Dei – Collectanea Theatina. 2012, pp. 77–107.
- Darstellung, Wertung und Funktion von Einsamkeit. Bernhard von Tiron, die ersten Eremiten, Eucherius von Lyon, in: Mittellateinisches Jahrbuch 44 (2009), pp. 273–302.
- Bachtin und Seneca – zum Grotesken in der „Apocolocyntosis Divi Claudii“, in: Hermes 4 (2007), pp. 469–481.
- Doppelte Dissonanz und perpetuierte Demut. Die Gattungsdiskussion zur Heiligenlegende im Spiegel der ‚Vita Beati Bernardi’ des Gaufredus Grossus Grossus, in: Mittellateinisches Jahrbuch 42 (2007), pp. 79–95.
