= Bludenzer Tage zeitgemäßer Musik =

Austrian music festival

- Genre: Contemporary classical music
- Dates: Autumn / Winter
- Location(s): Bludenz, Vorarlberg (Austria)
- Years active: since 1988
- Organised by: Association "allerArt Bludenz"
- Website: BTZM

The Bludenzer Tage zeitgemäßer Musik (Bludenzer Days of Contemporary Music) is an international festival of contemporary music that has been taking place in Bludenz, Vorarlberg (Austria) since 1988. The aim of the festival is "to make contemporary music audible in Bludenz".

== History ==
In its first 30 years, more than 200 world premieres have taken place as part of the festival.

Georg Friedrich Haas was the first artistic director, followed by Wolfram Schurig and Alexander Moosbrugger. The Italian composer Clara Iannotta has been responsible for the program since 2014.

Due to the COVID-19 pandemic, the 2020 edition of the festival had to be cancelled.
