= Castle Rock (TV series) =

2010s American horror TV series

- Genre: Mystery; Science fiction; Psychological horror; Supernatural; Thriller
- Created by: Sam Shaw; Dustin Thomason
- Based on: Castle Rock by Stephen King
- Starring: André Holland; Melanie Lynskey; Bill Skarsgård; Jane Levy; Scott Glenn; Sissy Spacek; Lizzy Caplan; Paul Sparks; Barkhad Abdi; Yusra Warsama; Elsie Fisher; Matthew Alan; Tim Robbins
- Theme music composer: Thomas Newman
- Composers: Thomas Newman; Chris Westlake
- Country of origin: United States
- Original language: English
- No. of seasons: 2
- No. of episodes: 20

Production
- Executive producers: J. J. Abrams; Stephen King; Sam Shaw; Dustin Thomason; Ben Stephenson; Mark Lafferty; Liz Glotzer
- Producers: Edwin saju; Robin Sweet; Tamara Isaac; Scott Brown
- Cinematography: Richard Rutkowski; Jeff Greeley
- Editors: Matthew V. Colonna; Tom Wilson; Kelley Dixon; Tanya Swerling; Trevor Baker
- Running time: 35–60 minutes
- Production companies: Bad Robot; Old Curiosity Shop; Darkbloom (season 1); Warner Bros. Television

Original release
- Network: Hulu
- Release: July 25, 2018 – December 11, 2019

Castle Rock is an American supernatural horror television series, adapted from Stephen King's fictional town of Castle Rock, Maine. The series was created by Sam Shaw and Dustin Thomason, and premiered on Hulu on July 25, 2018.

The first season starred André Holland, Melanie Lynskey, Bill Skarsgård, Jane Levy, Scott Glenn, and Sissy Spacek. A second season acting as a separate stand-alone story premiered on October 23, 2019, starring Lizzy Caplan, Paul Sparks, Barkhad Abdi, Yusra Warsama, Elsie Fisher, Matthew Alan, and Tim Robbins. In November 2020, Hulu cancelled the series after two seasons.

== Premise ==
Castle Rock combines "the mythological scale and intimate character storytelling of King's best-loved works, weaving an epic saga of darkness and light, played out on a few square miles of Maine woodland."

== Cast and characters ==
=== Main ===
==== Season 1 ====
- André Holland as Henry Matthew Deaver, a criminal attorney specializing in capital punishment cases. He left Castle Rock after the townspeople suspected his involvement in his adoptive father's death, but returns upon receiving a strange request.
  - Caleel Harris as young Henry
- Melanie Lynskey as Molly Strand, the owner of M. Strand & Associates Real Estate, and a childhood neighbor of Henry, who possesses telepathic and empathic abilities.
  - Cassady McClincy as young Molly
- Bill Skarsgård as "The Kid" / "The Angel" (guest star for season 2), an enigmatic inmate at Shawshank State Penitentiary secretly held prisoner by Warden Dale Lacy for 27 years. He specifically asks for Henry after being released from an empty septic tank located beneath an abandoned cell block in the prison. Skarsgård cameos twice in the second season.
- Jane Levy as Diane "Jackie" Torrance, an aspiring writer who works at M. Strand & Associates Real Estate, and is the niece of Jack Torrance. She possesses a vast knowledge of Castle Rock's history and has taken her uncle's name in order to spite her parents.
- Scott Glenn as Alan Pangborn, the retired sheriff of Castle Rock who moves in with Ruth Deaver unbeknownst to her son Henry. Pangborn is accidentally shot by Ruth when she mistakes him for her dead husband.
- Sissy Spacek as Ruth Deaver, Henry's estranged adoptive mother and a lifelong Castle Rock resident, whose struggle with dementia leads her to reveal secrets about the town's dark past. Ruth later dies sometime before the first season epilogue, and is buried alongside Alan Pangborn.
  - Schuyler Fisk as young Ruth

==== Season 2 ====
- Lizzy Caplan as Annie Wilkes, a mentally ill nurse who gets stuck in Castle Rock.
  - Madison Johnson as Young Annie Wilkes
  - Ruby Cruz as Teen Annie Wilkes
- Paul Sparks as John "Ace" Merrill, Pop's nephew who stands to take over the family business.
  - Max von Schroeter as Teen Ace
- Barkhad Abdi as Abdi Howlwadaag, Nadia's older brother who wants to strengthen Somali ties in their community
  - Idiris Yusof as Young Abdi
- Yusra Warsama as Dr. Nadia Howlwadaag, a Somali doctor employed as the medical director at the hospital in Jerusalem's Lot.
  - Idil Guled as Young Nadia
- Elsie Fisher as Joy Wilkes (born Evangeline Wilkes), Annie's daughter.
  - Colbi Gannett as Young Joy
- Matthew Alan as Chris Merrill, Ace's brother who finds himself stuck in the feud between the Merrills and the Somali community.
  - Charlie Tacker as Young Chris
- Tim Robbins as Reginald "Pop" Merrill, the dying head of the Merrill crime family.

=== Recurring ===
==== Season 1 ====
- Jeffrey Pierce portrays a younger Alan Pangborn in a recurring role.
- Noel Fisher as Dennis Zalewski, a correctional officer at Shawshank who discovers "The Kid" and anonymously calls Henry after hearing "The Kid" say his name. Zalewski begins to go insane and, after discovering that Henry is dropping the Kid's case, guns down numerous prison officers before he is killed by another officer.
- Frances Conroy as Martha Lacy, the now-widowed wife of Dale Lacy whom Henry visits in an attempt to gain more information about Shawshank. Also guest in season 2.
- Ann Cusack as Theresa Porter, the new warden of Shawshank and Dale Lacy's successor. Porter covers up The Kid's existence, fearing that she will be the scapegoat. Porter is run over by a prison bus carrying former Shawshank prisoners, after agreeing with Lacy that The Kid is the Devil.
- Chris Coy as Boyd, a correctional officer at Shawshank who works alongside Dennis.
- Josh Cooke as Reeves, the deputy warden of Shawshank.
- Charlie Tahan as Dean Merrill, a teenage drug dealer who supplies Molly with medication.
- Terry O'Quinn as Dale Lacy, the former warden of Shawshank who commits suicide by decapitation shortly before "The Kid" is discovered.
- Allison Tolman as Bridget Strand, Molly's sister.
- Adam Rothenberg as Reverend Matthew Deaver, Henry's late adoptive father and Castle Rock's former pastor. The townspeople labeled Henry as the prime suspect in Rev. Deaver's death. It is revealed that Henry did in fact attempt to kill Matthew, after discovering that Matthew intended to kill Ruth for having an affair with Alan.
- Aaron Staton as Drew, Castle Rock's pastor and Matthew Deaver's successor at the local Church of the Incarnation. Staton reprises his role in season 2 as a pastor for Pop Merrill, becoming the first character from a previous season to reappear in another.
- Zabryna Guevara as Maret
- Rory Culkin as Willie, the interpreter, and protégé of Odin Branch.
- Charles Jones as Odin Branch, an old friend of Reverend Matthew Deaver with advanced degrees in bioacoustics and psychoacoustics.
- Chosen Jacobs as Wendell Deaver, Henry's son.
- Mark Harelik as Gordon, a history professor from Des Moines, Iowa who moves to Castle County after attacking a man for sleeping with his wife. Following the move, the couple converts the Lacy home into a bed and breakfast.
- Lauren Bowles as Lilith, wife of Gordon, with whom she newly co-owns the Lacy home.
- Mathilde Dehaye as Amity

==== Season 2 ====
- John Hoogenakker as Carl Wilkes, "a man with a complicated connection to Annie Wilkes"
- Robin Weigert as Chrysida Wilkes, Annie Wilkes's mom
- Isayas J. Theodros as Jamal
- Chris Mulkey as Clay
- Abby Corrigan as Chance
- Tenea Intriago as Vera
- Aaron Staton as Pastor, who has sided with Ace
- Mathilde Dehaye as Amity, the prophet of New Jerusalem in 17th century
- Faysal Ahmed as Hassan
- Alison Wright as Valerie
- Joy Lang as Councilwoman Pinto
- Kate Avallone as Evelyn
- Sarah Gadon as Rita K. Green, Joy's biological mother and Annie's stepmother

=== Guest ===
==== Season 1 ====
- Phyllis Somerville as Leanne Chambers ("Severance"), one of Henry's clients in Texas who is sentenced to death for murdering her husband Richard.
- Brionne Davis as Garrett Coyne ("Habeas Corpus")
- Audrey Moore as Mrs. Strand, Molly's mother. ("Habeas Corpus")
- Timothy John Smith as Deputy Norris Ridgewick ("Habeas Corpus")
- Burke Moses as Local Color Host ("Local Color"), the host of public access television series Local Color on WEBV, Castle County's community television station.
- David Selby as Josef Desjardins ("The Box"), a barber and the brother of Vince Desjardins, a convicted felon who was suspected in Henry Deaver's disappearance.
- Richard Schiff as Warden Porter's Superior ("Harvest"), a man to whom Porter reports at Shawshank.
- James LeGros as the Sheriff of Castle Rock ("Harvest")
- Peta Sergeant as Angela ("Harvest")
- Amanda Brooks as Psychologist ("Harvest")
- Jayne Atkinson as Daria Reese ("Past Perfect"), a senior state police officer who knows Henry from when he and her daughter were in high school together.
- Rodrigo Lopresti as Gaddis ("Past Perfect"), the male member of the couple that are Gordon and Lilith's first bed and breakfast guests.

== Episodes ==
Season	Episodes	Originally released	
Season	Episodes	First released	Last released
1	10	July 25, 2018	September 12, 2018
2	10	October 23, 2019	December 11, 2019

=== Season 1 (2018) ===
No. overall	No. in season	Title	Directed by	Written by	Original release date	Prod. code
1	1	"Severance"	Michael Uppendahl	Sam Shaw & Dustin Thomason	July 25, 2018	T50.10001
In 1991 Castle Rock, Maine, Sheriff Alan Pangborn finds missing child Henry Deaver standing on the town's frozen lake. Twenty-seven years later, on his last day as warden of Shawshank State Penitentiary, Dale Lacy commits suicide. His successor, Theresa Porter, plans to reopen a long-abandoned cell block so that she can maintain the growing inmate population. While counting the beds, guard Dennis Zalewski comes across a mysterious, unaccounted-for inmate locked in an underground cage. The Kid, upon being released, whispers Henry's full name. Porter refuses to involve Henry, who is now a death-row lawyer, but Zalewski anonymously calls him. After returning to Castle Rock and reconnecting with Pangborn and his dementia-affected mother Ruth, Henry attempts to learn more about The Kid only for Porter to stonewall him. Zalewski, meanwhile, sees on the prison surveillance monitors that The Kid has escaped and slaughtered several other guards. In a flashback, it is revealed that Henry's father went missing around the same time he did and was found dead. In a second flashback, Lacy tells The Kid to ask for Henry when the time comes.
2	2	"Habeas Corpus"	Michael Uppendahl	Sam Shaw & Dustin Thomason	July 25, 2018	T50.10009
Henry tries to learn more about the events at Shawshank from Lacy's widow only to be kicked out when she accuses him of killing his father. Zalewski discovers that the mass slaughter was all in his head and confronts The Kid. Pangborn meets with Porter, telling her he found a letter written by Lacy. In the letter, he states his belief that the Devil had taken on the form of a boy and that he locked him away because God told him to. Porter immediately places The Kid in a new cell only for his cellmate to die of cancer.
3	3	"Local Color"	Dan Attias	Gina Welch	July 25, 2018	T50.10002
In a flashback Molly goes to Henry's house at night and sees his father is on life support. She removes his breathing tube. In the present Molly has a dream that she is in a church. Henry's father is preaching and looks to her saying there is a sinner among them. Henry asks Molly to put his mother's house on the market. Molly declines to represent him as she states it would be a conflict of interest. In a flashback, Molly invites Henry to her house. Molly tells Henry that she can read his thoughts. Back in the present, The Kid is eating by himself as Zalewski and another guard look on. Zalewski meets Henry off-site and asks him to represent The Kid. Molly returns to her home, finding it has been broken into. She and Jackie clean up. Jackie finds a missing poster of young Henry and asks Molly if he really killed his dad. Henry takes Molly to her meeting for a TV series.
4	4	"The Box"	Michael Uppendahl	Scott Brown	August 1, 2018	T50.10003
Henry experiences flashbacks from when he went missing and goes to the home of a suspect in his case. He finds the suspect who gives him the police file associated with his disappearance. Meanwhile, Henry's father's casket arrives at the church. Henry decides to take the prison's offer for the Kid, claiming he wants to go back to his family. Zalewski has an encounter with the Kid. When Henry tells him that he will take the settlement, Zalewski takes a gun and shoots many officers inside the prison before being gunned down himself, in front of Henry.
5	5	"Harvest"	Andrew Bernstein	Lila Byock	August 8, 2018	T50.10004
In 2016, Henry gets his hearing checked. He says that he used to have issues when he was younger. In the present Henry's hearing is still affected from the shooting at Shawshank five days earlier. Henry's father's casket arrives at the church before it's moved to the new plot, and the pastor tells Henry that something odd is happening; the casket is dripping blood, but this shouldn't be happening because his father died a long time ago. Wildfires are raging near Castle Rock causing some residents to evacuate. Not wanting further scandal Shawshank releases the Kid. In a flashback, Lacy tells the Kid about their first encounter and asks if he remembers the crazy story the Kid told him when they first met. In the present, the Kid is getting a psych evaluation and told that he has amnesia. Henry sets him up in the room above Molly's office. Ruth has a bad night because of her dementia. She feels something bad is going to happen that night. The Kid wanders into a family's birthday celebration and sits in the shadows watching the family. The family starts arguing and the celebration becomes an abusive nightmare. Jackie finds the Kid in the room above the office. Alan is honored at a bridge-naming ceremony, during which Ruth is spooked by a dog and jumps off the bridge and into the water. Molly returns to the office finding the Kid is not there. Unknown to Molly, the Kid is with Jackie who tells the Kid about her uncle, Jack Torrance. Alan and Henry speak with Ruth at the hospital. Alan discovers the Kid in the forest. Alan states that the Kid hasn't aged a day since 1991, expresses suspicion, and aims his gun at the kid; the Kid responds by offering to help Ruth.
6	6	"Filter"	Kevin Hooks	Vinnie Wilhelm & Marc Bernardin	August 15, 2018	T50.10005
The episode opens with the second funeral and burial of Matthew Deaver, Henry's adoptive father. Henry begins to hear a ringing in his ear which he also experienced as a child. The Kid tells Alan to find Warden Lacy's old car in order to save Ruth's memory. Henry brings the Kid to Juniper Hills Psychiatric Hospital. Henry's son Wendell comes to visit. Ruth describes to Wendell how she uses chess pieces to help her memory. Henry goes to Molly to discuss the flashbacks he has of his father bringing him into the woods and Molly admits to murdering his father. Henry goes into the same woods that his father brought him into as a child. He discovers two campers, Odin, a deaf man, and Willie, his interpreter. Odin claims that the ringing Henry hears is a schisma, which Henry's father believed was the Voice of God. He tricks Henry into an anechoic chamber in their camper where he begins to hallucinate his father. The Kid has escaped Juniper Hills by setting a fire and Alan finds him on the front porch of the Deaver home with a bloody hand. Alan rushes into the house to try to find Ruth.
7	7	"The Queen"	Greg Yaitanes	Sam Shaw	August 22, 2018	T50.10006
The timeline shifts between the past and present, at once recounting Ruth's life with Henry as a boy, scenes from previous episodes now through Ruth's point of view, and the Kid's mysterious intrusion into Ruth's house in the present. Ruth recalls Matthew Deaver's first time hearing "the voice of God" and her relationship with Alan Pangborn. Expanding upon a scene from a previous episode, Wendell interprets Ruth's dementia with an AR smartphone game, calling Ruth a "timewalker", who must defeat her nemesis, Matthew Deaver in the form of the Kid. Back in the present, Ruth sends Wendell away to protect him. The Kid makes dinner for Ruth and tells her to eat a sedative. In response, Ruth distracts the Kid by asking him to draw her a bath, does not take the pill, and runs upstairs to find a revolver. While at first, she does not remember where the bullets are, her memories lead her to unpack the bullets in her suitcase. Returning to the events at the beginning of the episode, Ruth hides in the shed with the loaded revolver, ready to shoot the Kid when he walks through. Instead, she shoots and kills Alan Pangborn by accident as he walks through. Finding herself in the past, Alan arrives at the house in response to reports of the future gunshots that killed him, and the pair resume their relationship.
8	8	"Past Perfect"	Ana Lily Amirpour	Mark Lafferty	August 29, 2018	T50.10007
Gordon and Lilith, who bought Lacy's house, turn it into a murder-story bed and breakfast. Gordon, who has trouble forgiving Lilith over her affair, murders their first booking — who are cheating on their spouses. That same night, Molly's "connection" to Henry draws her to the woods, where she frees him from the locked chamber in Odin's camper, though neither of them sees Odin's murdered corpse nearby. While the Kid tells Henry about Ruth killing Alan, and that he has waited for Henry for 27 years, Henry's son Wendell calls in the state police. The Kid runs off and is suspected of Alan's murder. Henry breaks into Lacy's (now Gordon's) house and finds Lacy's 27 years of drawings of an unchanging the Kid. Gordon and Lilith find him and try to kill him, fearful he'll reveal the murder of their lodgers. In the melee, Lilith accidentally stabs herself in the jugular, while Jackie Torrance arrives and saves Henry by burying an ax in Gordon's skull. The Kid visits Molly and finally starts talking, beginning with how he has seen her die in the woods.
9	9	"Henry Deaver"	Julie Anne Robinson	Vinnie Wilhelm & Scott Brown	September 5, 2018	T50.10008
The Kid reveals to Molly that he is Henry Deaver, the biological son of Ruth and Pastor Matthew from an alternate reality. In a flashback to the Kid's universe, Ruth followed through on leaving her troubled husband in 1991, taking her child, and fleeing to Boston. After they left, the Pastor was not murdered by 12-year-old Molly but did find 12-year-old Henry from the main universe after he had gone missing in 1991 from his reality. In 2018, this Pastor Deaver commits suicide, and the now-grown Henry from this universe finds the still 12-year-old Henry in a cage in his father's basement. Adult Henry and his Molly talk to 12-year-old Henry, who insists the voices are calling him to the woods. When Molly touches his hand, she sees the first 12 years of the Molly and Henry of his reality. Molly and adult Henry take 12-year-old Henry to the woods near Castle Lake, where they see people from centuries of multiple realities. Molly is accidentally killed, 12-year-old Henry returns to his reality, and adult Henry follows him, becoming the Kid.
10	10	"Romans"	Nicole Kassell	Dustin Thomason & Mark Lafferty	September 12, 2018	T50.10010
Molly explains to Henry what she has learned from the Kid regarding their intersecting lives and realities. Henry and the Kid are arrested as suspects in the flurry of deaths. In jail, the Kid tells Henry that bad follows him because he is an anomaly to this reality and that they must go together to Castle Lake before the sounds, signifying the realities are touching, disappear. More strange deaths occur, leading to some Shawshank inmates slaughtering civilians and officers at the Castle Rock jail. Henry and the Kid escape in the confusion, with the Kid forcing Henry, at gunpoint, to Castle Lake. Henry starts to remember his experience with his father in 1991, including the fact that he pushed Preacher Deaver off a cliff for planning to kill his mother, Ruth. Henry overpowers the Kid, and in a flash Henry sees the Kid's face aged and deformed. One year later, Henry is living in Castle Rock as a property lawyer, Molly is a successful real estate agent in the Florida Keys and the Kid is imprisoned in the now-abandoned Shawshank. In a mid-credits scene, Jackie talks to Dean Merrill about the book she is writing and her plans to travel west to research her family history.

=== Season 2 (2019) ===
No. overall	No. in season	Title	Directed by	Written by	Original release date	Prod. code
11	1	"Let the River Run"	Greg Yaitanes	Dustin Thomason	October 23, 2019	T50.10201
Annie Wilkes and her teenage daughter Joy have been traveling on the road since Joy was a child, and are stranded in Castle Rock following a car accident. They take a room at the Stargazer Lodge, owned by Ace Merrill. Ace has a troubled relationship with his uncle, "Pop" Merrill, who raised Ace and his brother Chris, alongside two Somali orphan refugees, Abdi and Nadia Howlwadaag. Ace owns a mall property and is losing tenants to Abdi's new development at Salem's Lot, which worsens the friction between them. Annie gets a temp job as an RN at the local hospital where Nadia is a doctor. Short of medication to control her hallucinations, Annie breaks into Nadia's house to steal Nadia's passkey for the secured pharmaceuticals room at the hospital; she's nearly caught, but Ace firebombs the house, and Annie escapes. Later, Ace enters Annie's room to threaten Joy, who he knows witnessed him preparing the Molotov cocktails, and Annie kills him. While trying to dispose of Ace's body, Annie falls through a chasm in the newly-excavated area of Abdi's future mall.
12	2	"New Jerusalem"	Phil Abraham	K'naan Warsame	October 23, 2019	T50.10202
Annie comes to and finds herself surrounded by dozens of coffins. Leaving the body, she escapes through underground passages and surfaces at the nearby Marsten House, which is occupied by squatters. Annie returns home and realizes her necklace is missing. In her panic, she tells Joy that they have to leave, causing a fight between them. Nadia tells Pop about Ace's attack. Joy injures herself while fighting with Annie and needs stitches. They go to the hospital where Joy asks to be seen alone. In a flashback, we see Pop adopting Abdi and Nadia. At present time, Pop searches the town for Ace and follows the trail to Annie, who claims that Ace was taken into the woods with a dark-skinned man with a gun. Pop interrogates Abdi and tries to extort a confession from him, but collapses. Joy and Annie fight about staying in town, causing Joy to storm inside. Annie notices beetles surround the car and sees Ace, back from the dead.
13	3	"Ties That Bind"	Anne Sewitsky	Scott Brown & Obehi Janice	October 23, 2019	T50.10203
Annie runs inside the house and locks all the doors. When she looks outside, Ace has disappeared. Abdi takes Pop to the hospital, where he recovers from the mini-stroke he had. Joy has a good time with Chance and the other kids at Castle Lake. When Joy returns to the lodge, Annie confesses that she murdered Ace but that he's back from the dead and is stalking them. Joy, believing that Annie is having a psychotic break, acts on an agreed-upon emergency plan and ties Annie to the bed after sedating her to ensure that she takes her meds. Annie smashes a glass and uses the shards to cut her bonds. During a struggle, Annie cuts Joy with the glass, and Joy flees. The undead Ace visits Pop in the hospital and lures other people to Marsten House.
14	4	"Restore Hope"	Phil Abraham	Guy Busick & R. Christopher Murphy	October 30, 2019	T50.10204
Joy flees to the local church and is taken into the care of Nadia, who recognizes her as Annie's daughter. Chance goes to Annie and Joy's room to take Joy's things, including Annie's locked box. When Joy gets the box, she opens it to find a gun, several license plates, and a CD-ROM. Nadia informs Pop that his chemotherapy isn't working. Embracing his oncoming death, he throws an Irish wake for friends and family. Ace takes Chris to the church where he recounts parts of the history of Jerusalem's Lot, including the presence of a mysterious cult several hundred years prior, and then stabs him. Chris staggers out but is killed by the priest, who has also been converted to the cult. Nadia goes through Pop's papers for his VA info that she needs to get him into a trial for a new cancer treatment and discovers that he was on tour in Somalia. She confronts Pop and, realizing that he was the soldier who killed her and Abdi's mother, storms out.
15	5	"The Laughing Place"	Anne Sewitsky	Vince Calandra & Daria Polatin	November 6, 2019	T50.10205
In an extended flashback, Annie as a child is removed from school after she lashes out violently at a bully. She is homeschooled by her father, who uses a novel he's writing as a teaching tool, and as a teenager is taught by Rita, a language tutor. After Annie's father leaves them, Annie's mother attempts to kill both herself and Annie by driving her car into a river; Annie's mother drowns but Annie survives and is taken in by her father. Shortly thereafter, Rita and Annie's father reveal that they are in a relationship and that Rita's baby daughter Evangeline, who was conceived when Annie's parents were still together, is his. When Annie's father finishes his book, Annie is enraged that he'd dedicated it to Rita, and pushes him down the stairs, killing him. Annie stabs Rita and flees with Evangeline. Annie intends to commit murder-suicide with Evangeline but changes her mind when Evangeline laughs joyfully. In the present, Joy accesses the CD-ROM, which contains Annie's father's novel. Joy does an internet search for the name in the dedication, and her call is picked up by Rita, who survived Annie's attack and is still alive.
16	6	"The Mother"	Mark Tonderai-Hodges	Daria Polatin & Vince Calandra	November 13, 2019	T50.10206
Joy's call to Rita is dropped but Rita, who has not stopped searching for her daughter, tracks the call to Castle Rock and goes there. Rita reunites with Joy and explains the full story of her true identity; Joy is overwhelmed and asks for time to decide if she wants to go with Rita or not. Joy goes to see Annie, who gives her a letter of love and regret but lets Joy go. When Annie returns to the lodge, Rita is waiting for her with a gun, and the two go out into the woods. Joy follows them and injects Rita with a tranquilizer; Rita drops the gun, which goes off and kills her. The police arrive and Annie, to protect Joy, claims that she did it. More townspeople are killed and converted to Ace's cult, which is centered at Marsten House, including Chris. One of the victims temporarily escapes before the conversion is complete, due to her medication slowing the process.
17	7	"The Word"	Loni Peristere	Guy Busick & R. Christopher Murphy	November 20, 2019	T50.10207
In an extended flashback to four hundred years prior, a group of French settlers in New Jerusalem is starving until one of them, Amity, has an encounter with a hooded "angel" and returns with food, land fertility, and a new religion. Those who reject the new religion are killed. Amity is eventually commanded by the angel that all of them must die in ritualistic murder and await resurrection in four hundred years. The last to be killed is Amity's lover, Pere Augustin, who is the first to be resurrected in the present day in the vessel of Ace Merrill. The Marsten House is being renovated and decorated with cult drawings. Augustin has decided that Annie is to be Amity's vessel because she was the one who woke them. Pop learns that Ace/Augustin and his cultists searched for a caged man in Shawshank prison, but the cage was empty. The Castle Rock anniversary parade marches through town and stops in front of the church, where the pastor reveals a wooden statue of the hooded angel. Everyone who sees it is hypnotized, except Pop who doesn't look at it and flees.
18	8	"Dirty"	Craig William Macneill	Michael Olsen & K. Corrine Van Vliet	November 27, 2019	T50.10208
The cultists hypnotize almost all the people in Castle Rock into being Amity's mindless army. Annie and Joy are brought by the cultists to Marsten House. Augustin changes out Annie's meds to "clean" her for use as a vessel, causing her to hallucinate. Augustin sees Joy's drawings, which are reminiscent of Amity's art, and decides that she is Amity's true vessel. Annie fights off the cultists and almost escapes with Joy, but Joy is hypnotized, forcing Annie to leave on her own. Chris, possessed by the cultist Bertrand, tries to kill Nadia but she fights back. Thinking that Chris is having a psychotic break, Nadia injects him with Haldol, which allows Chris to temporarily take control of his body and save Nadia from other cultists before he dies again of his wounds.
19	9	"Caveat Emptor"	Greg Yaitanes	Scott Brown	December 4, 2019	T50.10209
Pop, Nadia, Chance, Abdi, and Annie — all still sound of mind — find each other and arm themselves at Pop's reinforced Emporium shop. Augustin and his army surround the shop, offering to allow them to go free if Pop hands over letters written by Warden Lacy to Sheriff Pangborn about the "devil" he kept in a cage. The group of survivors shares information about the threat, and Pop realizes that the cultists are searching for their "angel", which might be the man in the cage, and burns Lacy's letters. The cultists attack the Emporium. Nadia, Abdi, Annie, and Chance escape, but Pop stays behind to give them more time. Aware that he will be "converted" if killed, Pop tries to blow himself up to make the process more difficult, but the bomb doesn't go off. Augustin shoots Pop in the head, killing him.
20	10	"Clean"	Lisa Brühlmann	Dustin Thomason & Michael Olsen	December 11, 2019	T50.10210
The cultists prepare for a sunset ritual, which includes Joy dressed up in Amity's likeness. Pop is awakened as "Etienne", who tells Augustin the content of Lacy's letters: there is a schisma at Castle Lake that allows their angel to cross dimensions at will. Annie, Nadia, Abdi, and Chance return to Salem's Lot; Annie and Chance go to Marsten House to find Joy, while Nadia and Abdi place explosives in the underground tunnels. "Etienne" reveals himself to still be Pop, who injected himself with Haldol before he died, and he helps Nadia and Abdi set up the explosives. The bombs go off, breaking the hypnotic hold over the townsfolk. Pop is killed again in the explosion, Annie finds Joy, and the angel sees the explosion from Castle Lake and disappears. One week later, Annie and Joy leave Castle Rock. Joy remains distant, and Annie mistakenly concludes that she is possessed by a cultist and drowns her, only to learn her error afterward. Annie frantically tries to revive Joy and seemingly succeeds; the pair reconcile and revive their loving relationship. However, Annie is merely hallucinating Joy's recovery. The final scene is of Annie and "Joy" waiting for a book-signing with "their" favorite author Paul Sheldon.

== Production ==
=== Development ===
On February 17, 2017, it was announced that Hulu, J. J. Abrams, and Stephen King were collaborating on a new series entitled Castle Rock, based on King's large canon of work. It was further reported that the series would be written by Sam Shaw and Dustin Thomason, produced by Abrams' Bad Robot, and distributed by Warner Bros. Television. Four days later, Hulu revealed that they had given the production a series order consisting of a first season of ten episodes, and executive producers would include Abrams, King, Shaw, Thomason, Ben Stephenson, and Liz Glotzer. On July 12, 2017, it was announced that Michael Uppendahl was joining the production as a co-executive producer and would direct the pilot episode.

On August 14, 2018, it was announced that Hulu had renewed the series for a second season, which premiered on October 23, 2019.

On November 3, 2020, Hulu canceled the series after two seasons.

=== Casting ===
On May 11, 2017, it was announced that André Holland had been cast in the series' lead role. In June 2017, Jane Levy, Sissy Spacek, and Melanie Lynskey had joined the main cast. On July 10, 2017, Bill Skarsgård was set to join the roster. In August 2017, it was reported that Scott Glenn and Terry O'Quinn had been added as series regulars, and on March 1, 2018, it was announced that Chosen Jacobs had joined in the recurring role of Wendell Deaver, the son of Holland's character. On June 8, 2018, it was announced during the annual ATX Television Festival that Allison Tolman will have the recurring role of Lynsky's character's sister, and five days later, it was reported that Noel Fisher was also on board.

In March 2019, it was announced that the season 2 cast would feature Lizzy Caplan, Tim Robbins, Garrett Hedlund, Elsie Fisher, Yusra Warsama, Barkhad Abdi and Matthew Alan in lead roles. Hedlund's role was later recast with Paul Sparks. On April 17, 2019, it was reported that John Hoogenakker had been cast in an undisclosed recurring role for season 2.

=== Filming ===
Principal photography for the first season was expected to take place in Massachusetts, in locations such as Orange, Massachusetts, and at New England Studios in Devens, Massachusetts. In August 2017, production began in Devens and in Orange, where the downtown area had been refitted to appear as the town of Castle Rock, and where production was expected to continue through January 2018. That month, crews also shot scenes at Vernon Hill School in Worcester, Massachusetts, and at an old Victorian house in Lancaster, Massachusetts. Filming returned to Orange during the week of August 21 for production of the series' second episode. In late September 2017, filming took place in Tewksbury, Massachusetts, at The Public Health Museum on the campus of the Tewksbury State Hospital. In October 2017, filming took place at the Central Cemetery in Orange where a funeral scene was shot. The downtown area was refitted with a more modern look in November for another phase of production. From September 4, 2017, until the end of the month, production took place at the former West Virginia Penitentiary in Moundsville, West Virginia, which appeared as the fictional Shawshank State Prison. On November 21, 2017, filming took place in Worcester in the lobby of the Mercantile Building, which had been refitted into a boardroom. On December 18, 2017, production for the season finale began. By January, all filming in Orange was completed, and the production proceeded to donate $3,500 to the town. The Fire Department received $2,500 for helping facilitate production, and the Trustees of Soldiers' Memorial was to receive another $1,000.

Visual effects were used to alter seasons, including adding snow to scenes in which there was no snow on location, as well as to create a forest fire in episode five.

In 2019, it was reported that filming for second season would take place at additional Massachusetts locations, including a former meat factory building in Clinton, and several properties in Gardner. Parts of season 2 episode 5 were filmed at a house on Prospect Street in Leominster, MA.

=== Music ===
The song "Twenty Four Hours from Tulsa" is used three times during the first season, including the first song heard in the premiere (Gene Pitney's 1963 version) and the last song heard over the closing credits of the finale (Dusty Springfield's 1964 version). It captures the underlying situation of The Kid in the lyrics: "Dearest darling, I had to write to say that I won't be home anymore / 'Cause something happened to me while I was driving home / And I'm not the same anymore".

== Release ==
=== Premiere ===
On June 8, 2018, the series took part in the annual ATX Television Festival in Austin, Texas, where a "first look" at footage took place. Following the premiere of the footage, a question-and-answer panel occurred with creators and executive producers Sam Shaw and Dustin Thomason. On June 19, 2018, it was announced that the series would hold its world premiere during the show's panel at San Diego Comic-Con, where cast members including Sissy Spacek, Bill Skarsgård, and Melanie Lynskey were set to be in attendance.

On September 7, 2018, the series took part in the 12th Annual PaleyFest Fall Television Previews, which featured a screening of the first-season finale and a discussion with creator and executive producer Sam Shaw.

=== Home media ===
The first season was released by Warner Bros. Home Entertainment on digital platforms on October 15, 2018. It was then released on Blu-ray, 4K UHD Blu-ray and DVD on January 8, 2019. All ten episodes of the season were made available in the set along with exclusive bonus content. The second season was announced to be released on digital platforms on January 21, 2020, and Blu-ray and DVD on May 19. The release was later postponed to July 21.

== Reception ==
=== Critical response ===
The first season has been met with a generally positive response from critics. On the review aggregation website Rotten Tomatoes, the first season holds an approval rating of 87% based on 185 reviews, with an average rating of 7.5/10. The website's critical consensus reads, "A meticulously crafted mystery brimming with allusions, Castle Rock is bound to please even the pickiest of Stephen King fans — though mileage may vary for casual viewers." Metacritic assigned the first season a weighted average score of 66 out of 100, based on 35 critics, indicating "generally favorable reviews".

Collider's Dave Trumbore praised the series, saying, "Shaw, Thomason, Abrams & Co. really nail the core concepts of King's storytelling here. Each character gets a good amount of screen time to focus on introspection...Castle Rock is a can't-miss series for Stephen King fans and a must-watch horror show for fans of dark, thrilling, character-focused mysteries." In a similarly favorable critique, Entertainment Weekly's Kristen Baldwin gave the series a grade of "A−" and commended it, saying, "Though most characters are new (Scott Glenn's Alan Pangborn, a sheriff who appeared in Needful Things and The Dark Half, is one exception), for King fans the world of Castle Rock will be inescapably familiar. Spending time here feels, in many ways, like coming home — with all of the excitement and dread such a visit entails." In another approving criticism, Ben Travers of IndieWire gave the series a grade of "B+" and complimented it, saying, "For a show that could've been dominated by its origins, Castle Rock sure has a good time breathing new life into them. Smart, fun scares; deeply felt, well-founded characters; layers of story to decipher, along with the references — what more could you want in a new piece of the Stephen King library?" In a mixed review, Dan Fienberg of The Hollywood Reporter criticized the series, saying, "The actors will offer the best incentive for the King-ambivalent to tune into Castle Rock, but I'm not sure even they will ultimately be enough to overcome the sluggish and vague story." In a negative review, Daniel D'Addario of Variety was even more disapproving, saying, "It's eerie-by-the-numbers, repeatedly telling us quite how scared we ought to be, without yet building characters for whom we feel sympathetic fear."

Among all first-season episodes, "The Queen" received particular acclaim from critics with praise being directed towards the writing and Spacek's performance. On Rotten Tomatoes, the episode holds a 100% approval rating with an average rating of 9.75 out of 10, based on 14 reviews. The Ringer's Miles Surrey referred to the episode as "not only the best episode of the series, but one of the best episodes of television in 2018." Vulture's Brian Tallerico awarded the episode a rating of five out of five stars and was similarly enthusiastic, saying, "Television doesn't get much more heartbreaking than "The Queen," a showcase for the legendary Sissy Spacek and one of the best hours of television this year." Aiming commendation at the episode's instrumental score, Birth.Movies.Death.'s Jacob Knight wrote, "The music in Castle Rock – courtesy of composer Chris Westlake – has been nothing short of exemplary throughout the entire series, but in "The Queen" it practically becomes a character unto itself".

The second season has been met with a generally positive response from critics. On Rotten Tomatoes, the second season holds an approval rating of 89% based on 36 reviews, with an average rating of 7.8/10. The website's critical consensus reads, "Driven by an unsettlingly compelling Lizzy Caplan, Castle Rock's second chapter opens the borders of its titular town without losing any of its creeping atmosphere." Metacritic assigned the second season a weighted average score of 69 out of 100, based on 9 critics, indicating "generally favorable reviews".

=== Awards and nominations ===
Year	Award	Category	Nominee(s)	Result	Ref.
2018	People's Choice Awards	The Drama Show of 2018	Castle Rock	Shortlisted	
2019	Art Directors Guild Awards	Excellence in Production Design for a One Hour; Single-Camera Series	Steve Arnold (for "The Box")	Nominated	
2019	Golden Reel Awards	Sound Editing - Episodic Long Form – Effects / Foley	Tim Kimmel, Bradley Katona, Jeffrey Wilhoit, Dylan Wilhoit, Brett Voss (for "Severance")	Nominated	
2019	Writers Guild of America Awards	Television: Long Form – Original	Marc Bernardin, Scott Brown, Lila Byock, Mark Lafferty, Sam Shaw, Dustin Thomason, Gina Welch, & Vinnie Wilhelm	Won	
2019	Fangoria Chainsaw Awards	Best Series	Castle Rock	Nominated	
2019	Satellite Awards	Best Television Series – Genre	Castle Rock	Nominated	
2019	Saturn Awards	Best Streaming Horror & Thriller Series	Castle Rock	Nominated	
2019	Saturn Awards	Best Supporting Actress in Streaming Presentation	Sissy Spacek	Nominated	
2021	Saturn Awards	Best Action/Thriller Television Series	Castle Rock	Nominated	

== See also ==
- Castle Rock, the fictional town upon which the series is based
