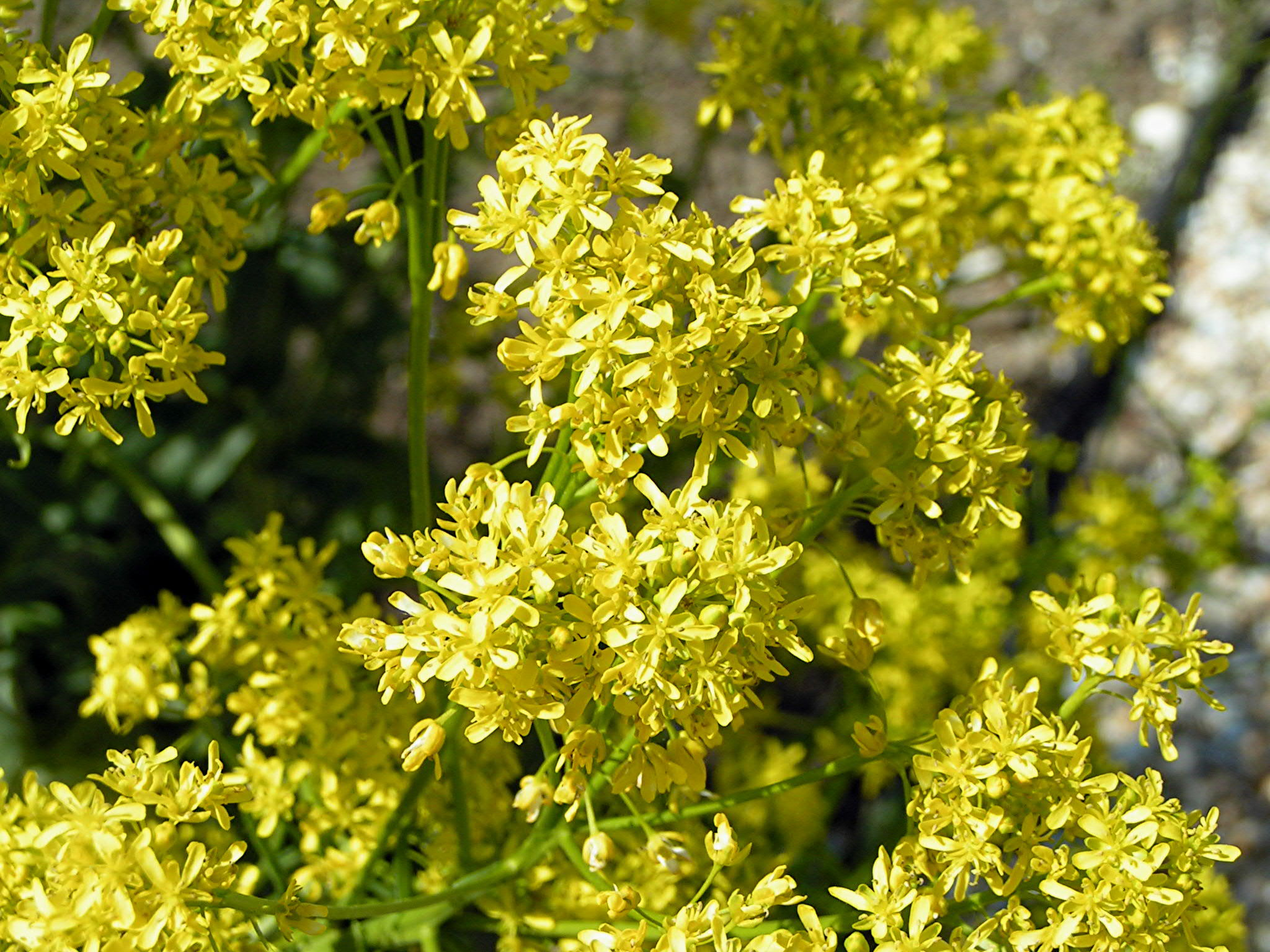
- Isatis tinctoria

Scientific classification
- Kingdom: Plantae
- Clade: Tracheophytes
- Clade: Angiosperms
- Clade: Eudicots
- Clade: Rosids
- Order: Brassicales
- Family: Brassicaceae
- Genus: Isatis; L.

Species
- About 30 species, including: Isatis boissieriana Isatis glauca Isatis tinctoria others (see text)

Synonyms
- List: Boreava Jaub. & Spach; Martinsia Godr.; Pachypteris Kar. & Kir.; Pachypterygium Bunge; Sameraria Desv.; Tauscheria Fisch. ex DC.; Tetrapterygium Fisch. & C.A.Mey.

= Isatis =

Genus of flowering plants

Isatis is a genus of flowering plants in the family Brassicaceae, native to the Mediterranean region east to central Asia. Its genus name, Isatis, derives from the ancient Greek word for the plant, ἰσάτις. The genus includes woad (Isatis tinctoria). Due to their extremely variable morphology, the Asian species in particular are difficult to determine; the only reliable diagnostic feature is the ripe fruit. They are (usually) biennial or perennial herbaceous plants, often bluish and hairless or downy hairy with the upright stem branched.

== Description ==
They are annual, biennial or perennial, branched herbs, usually glabrous and glaucous except silique. Basal leaves generally elliptic-oblong, sessile; sessile caulinary, rounded to oval-oblong.

The hermaphrodite flowers are fourfold double perianth. The four sepals are ascending to upright. The four yellow to off-white or lilac-white petals are at least as long as the sepals. They have six stamens with very small, egg-shaped or elongated-round anthers. There are nectar glands. Racemose is branched or paniculated, ebracted, inflorescence, often reaching lax and elongated in the fruit.

The fruit is a generally linear silique, oblong-cuneate to suborbicular, indehiscent, flattened laterally, unilocular, little to conspicuously winged, glabrous or with tiny hairs.

== Species ==
Currently accepted species include:

- Isatis afghanica Hadac & Chrtek
- Isatis amani P.H.Davis
- Isatis apennina Ten. ex Grande
- Isatis apscheronica N.Busch
- Isatis aptera (Boiss. & Heldr.) Al-Shehbaz, Moazzeni & Mumm.
- Isatis arenaria Azn.
- Isatis armena L.
- Isatis arnoldiana N.Busch
- Isatis aucheri Boiss.
- Isatis biscutellifolia Boiss. & Buhse
- Isatis bitlisica P.H.Davis
- Isatis boissieriana Rchb.f.
- Isatis brachycarpa C.A.Mey.
- Isatis brevipes (Bunge) Jafri
- Isatis bullata Aitch. & Hemsl.
- Isatis bungeana Seidlitz
- Isatis buschiana Schischk.
- Isatis callifera Boiss. & Balansa
- Isatis campylocarpa Boiss.
- Isatis canaliculata (Vassilcz.) V.V.Botschantz.
- Isatis candolleana Boiss.
- Isatis cappadocica Desv.
- Isatis cardiocarpa (Trautv.) Al-Shehbaz, Moazzeni & Mumm.
- Isatis caucasica N.Busch
- Isatis cochlearis Boiss.
- Isatis constricta P.H.Davis
- Isatis costata C.A.Mey.
- Isatis davisiana H.Misirdali ex P.H.Davis, R.R.Mill & Kit Tan
- Isatis demiriziana H.Misirdali ex P.H.Davis, R.R.Mill & Kit Tan
- Isatis densiflora (Bunge ex Boiss.) D.A.German
- Isatis deserti (N.Busch) V.V.Botschantz.
- Isatis djurjaedae Coss. & Durieu
- Isatis elegans (Boiss.) Hadac & Chrtek
- Isatis emarginata Kar. & Kir.
- Isatis erzurumica P.H.Davis
- Isatis floribunda Boiss. ex Bornm.
- Isatis frigida Boiss. & Kotschy
- Isatis frutescens Kar. & Kir.
- Isatis gaubae Bornm.
- Isatis glastifolia (Fisch. & C.A.Mey.) Al-Shehbaz, Moazzeni & Mumm.
- Isatis glauca Aucher ex Boiss.
- Isatis grammotis Kit Tan
- Isatis gymnocarpa (Fisch. ex DC.) Al-Shehbaz, Moazzeni & Mumm.
- Isatis harsukhii O.E.Schulz
- Isatis hirtocalyx Franch.
- Isatis huber-morathii P.H.Davis
- Isatis iberica Steven
- Isatis jacutensis (N.Busch) N.Busch
- Isatis karjaginii Schischk.
- Isatis kotschyana Boiss. & Hohen.
- Isatis kozlovskyi Grossh.
- Isatis laevigata Trautv.
- Isatis latisiliqua Steven
- Isatis leuconeura Boiss. & Buhse
- Isatis littoralis Steven
- Isatis lockmanniana Kotschy ex Boiss.
- Isatis lusitanica L.
- Isatis mardinensis P.H.Davis & H.Misirdali
- Isatis maxima Pavlov
- Isatis microcarpa J.Gay ex Boiss.
- Isatis minima Bunge
- Isatis multicaulis (Kar. & Kir.) Jafri
- Isatis oblongata DC.
- Isatis odontogera (Bordz.) D.A.German
- Isatis ornithorhynchus N.Busch
- Isatis pachycarpa Rech.f., Aellen & Esfand.
- Isatis pinnatiloba P.H.Davis
- Isatis platyloba Link ex Steud.
- Isatis praecox Kit. ex Tratt.
- Isatis raimondoi Di Grist., Scafidi & Domina
- Isatis raphanifolia Boiss.
- Isatis rugulosa Bunge ex Boiss.
- Isatis sabulosa Steven ex Ledeb.
- Isatis sevangensis N.Busch
- Isatis sivasica P.H.Davis
- Isatis spatella P.H.Davis
- Isatis spectabilis P.H.Davis
- Isatis steveniana Trautv.
- Isatis stocksii Boiss.
- Isatis subdidyma (N.Busch) V.E.Avet.
- Isatis takhtajanii Avet.
- Isatis tinctoria L.
- Isatis tomentella Boiss. & Balansa
- Isatis trachycarpa Trautv.
- Isatis turcomanica Korsh.
- Isatis undulata Aucher ex Boiss.
- Isatis violascens Bunge
- Isatis zarrei Al-Shehbaz, Moazzeni & Mumm.
