= Manhattan (TV series) =

American drama television series

- Genre: Period drama
- Created by: Sam Shaw
- Starring: Rachel Brosnahan; Michael Chernus; Christopher Denham; Alexia Fast; Katja Herbers; John Benjamin Hickey; Harry Lloyd; Daniel Stern; Olivia Williams; Ashley Zukerman; William Petersen
- Composers: Jónsi & Alex; Zoë Keating; Jeff Russo
- Country of origin: United States
- Original language: English
- No. of seasons: 2
- No. of episodes: 23

Production
- Executive producers: Sam Shaw; Thomas Schlamme; David Ellison; Dana Goldberg; Marcy Ross; Dustin Thomason
- Production location: New Mexico
- Running time: 44–57 minutes
- Production companies: Darkbloom Productions; Lionsgate Television; Shoe Money Productions; Skydance Television; Tribune Studios

Original release
- Network: WGN America
- Release: July 27, 2014 – December 15, 2015

Manhattan (sometimes styled MANH(A)TTAN) is an American period drama television series depicting the Manhattan Project, the United States Army's research and development program which produced the first atomic weapons during World War II. Set mainly at the Los Alamos Laboratory from 1943 to 1944, the series is a largely fictionalized adaptation of true events.

The show was the first drama production for WGN America since the revival of Tribune Broadcasting's production arm as Tribune Studios. The series premiered on WGN America on July 27, 2014 and earned critical acclaim throughout its run, but failed to secure adequate ratings. As a result, it was canceled after its second season, becoming the first WGN America original series to be canceled.

== Plot ==
Set in 1943 and 1944 during the Manhattan Project and World War II, the series focuses on the scientists at Project Y and their families in the newly-created Los Alamos, New Mexico, a town the outside world knows nothing about. The government tells the scientists only what they need to know, while the scientists keep secrets from their families.

== Cast ==
=== Main ===
- John Benjamin Hickey as Dr. Frank Winter, leader of an initially small group of scientists working on an implosion design weapon (loosely based on Seth Neddermeyer and the E-5 Group at the Los Alamos Laboratory)
- Olivia Williams as Dr. Liza Winter, Frank's wife and a botanist
- Ashley Zukerman as Dr. Charlie Isaacs, a rising young star of the Project
- Rachel Brosnahan as Abby Isaacs, Charlie's wife
- Daniel Stern as Dr. Glen Babbit, mentor to other scientists (season 1; special guest season 2)
- Katja Herbers as Dr. Helen Prins, one of the few women scientists
- Harry Lloyd as Paul Crosley, a British scientist who wants to advance at any cost
- Alexia Fast as Callie Winter, Frank and Liza's rebellious teenage daughter (season 1; guest season 2) (Note: Portrayed by a body double in the first episode of season 2.)
- Christopher Denham as Jim Meeks, a scientist. Loosely based on the atomic spies, in particular Klaus Fuchs
- Michael Chernus as Louis "Fritz" Fedowitz, a scientist
- William Petersen as Colonel Emmett Darrow (season 2), a United States military officer

=== Recurring ===
- David Harbour as Dr. Reed Akley, lead scientist for the Thin Man bomb design
- Eddie Shin as Dr. Sidney "Sid" Liao, a Chinese-American scientist
- Daniel London as Professor J. Robert Oppenheimer, the melancholic, somewhat reclusive, world-renowned theoretical physicist, and scientific director of the Los Alamos National Laboratory
- Mark Moses as Col. Alden Cox
- Carole Weyers as Elodie Lancefield, bisexual wife of scientist Lancefield
- Richard Schiff as G-2 spy catcher Avraham Fisher (aka "Occam")
- Jefferson White as Private First Class Cole Dunlavey (aka "Iowa")
- Peter Stormare as Lazar
- Josh Cooke as scientist Lancefield
- Neve Campbell as Kitty Oppenheimer (season 2)
- Mamie Gummer as Nora (season 2)
- Griffin Dunne as Woodrow Lorentzen, a reporter and old friend of Liza Winter (season 2)

== Production ==
Television network WGN America premiered its first scripted show, the historical drama Salem, on April 20, 2014. Peter Liguori, CEO of WGN's parent, Tribune Media, emphasized a strategy of original content production as a way to improve the channel's prestige and profile. TV companies producing the show include Lionsgate Television, Skydance Television and Tribune Studios, a WGN affiliate. When announced in April 2014, 13 episodes were ordered.

The series began filming in mid-March across 12 acres (5 ha) in New Mexico. On October 14, 2014, Manhattan was renewed for a second season. Production on season 2 wrapped on July 24, 2015.

David Saltzberg, a physicist at UCLA, acted as the scientific consultant for the show, and Alex Wellerstein, a historian of science at Stevens Institute of Technology who studies the history of nuclear weapons and secrecy, acted as a historical consultant for the show for Season 2, providing period detail to the writers.

Creator Sam Shaw said although that at first the show seems to be about World War II, and the development of the atomic bomb, it was about two eras: the development of the atomic bomb, and after dropping of it on Japan. Speaking about a potential third season Shaw said "the most complicated and morally fascinating and dramatic aspects of the history don't come until after the end of World War II." Shaw noted that only Fritz, Meeks, and Winter knew exactly what happened at the end of season 2 and that going forward he hoped he would get to write that story. Shaw also said "I hope we'll get to follow characters in this moment when Los Alamos goes from being the best kept secret in the world to being the most famous city on the planet."

== Episodes ==
=== Season 1 (2014) ===
No. overall	No. in season	Title	Directed by	Written by	Original release date	U.S. viewers (millions)
1	1	"You Always Hurt the One You Love"	Thomas Schlamme	Sam Shaw	July 27, 2014	0.904
2	2	"The Prisoner's Dilemma"	Thomas Schlamme	Sam Shaw	August 3, 2014	0.339
3	3	"The Hive"	Christopher Misiano	Nathaniel Halpern & Lisa Melamed	August 10, 2014	0.398
4	4	"Last Reasoning of Kings"	Paris Barclay	Tom Spezialy & Gideon Yago	August 17, 2014	0.372
5	5	"A New Approach to Nuclear Cosmology"	Bill D'Elia	Mark Lafferty & Noelle Valdivia	August 24, 2014	0.377
6	6	"Acceptable Limits"	Michael Uppendahl	Dustin Thomason	August 31, 2014	0.295
7	7	"The New World"	Rosemary Rodriguez	Lila Byock & Dustin Thomason	September 7, 2014	0.426
8	8	"The Second Coming"	Daniel Stern	Sam Shaw & Dustin Thomason	September 14, 2014	0.303
9	9	"Spooky Action at a Distance"	Andrew Bernstein	Mark Lafferty	September 21, 2014	0.425
10	10	"The Understudy"	Simon Cellan Jones	Tom Spezialy	September 28, 2014	0.360
11	11	"Tangier"	Julie Anne Robinson	Scott Brown	October 5, 2014	0.371
12	12	"The Gun Model"	Dan Attias	Lila Byock	October 12, 2014	0.413
13	13	"Perestroika"	Thomas Schlamme	Sam Shaw	October 19, 2014	0.378

=== Season 2 (2015) ===
No. overall	No. in season	Title	Directed by	Written by	Original release date	U.S. viewers (millions)
14	1	"Damnatio Memoriae"	Thomas Schlamme	Sam Shaw	October 13, 2015	0.265
15	2	"Fatherland"	Dan Attias	Scott Brown	October 20, 2015	0.191
16	3	"The Threshold"	Andrew Bernstein	Lila Byock & Vinne Wilhelm	October 27, 2015	0.256
17	4	"Overlord"	Christopher Misiano	Alexander Woo	November 3, 2015	0.335
18	5	"The World of Tomorrow"	Daniel Stern	Mark Lafferty	November 10, 2015	0.161
19	6	"33"	Kimberly Peirce	Scott Brown & Megan Ferrell Burke	November 17, 2015	0.250
20	7	"Behold the Lord High Executioner"	Jennifer Getzinger	Lila Byock & Vinne Wilhelm	November 24, 2015	0.180
21	8	"Human Error"	Julie Anne Robinson	Mark Lafferty	December 1, 2015	0.308
22	9	"Brooklyn"	Michael Uppendahl	Dustin Thomason	December 8, 2015	0.240
23	10	"Jupiter"	Thomas Schlamme	Sam Shaw	December 15, 2015	0.201

== Reception ==
=== Critical reception ===
Season 1 of Manhattan received highly positive reception from television critics and has a Metacritic score of 78 out of 100, based on 23 "generally favorable" reviews. The review aggregation website Rotten Tomatoes reports a 90% critics rating, with an average rating of 8.3/10 based on 31 reviews; the site's consensus reads: "Though slow to start, Manhattan is a top-notch drama thanks to a talented cast, beautiful cinematography, and a keen eye for period detail."

Season 2 received further acclaim, scoring an 80 out of 100 based on nine reviews on Metacritic. Rotten Tomatoes reports a 93% approval rating, with an average rating of 8.7/10 based on 14 reviews, and the site's consensus reading, "Manhattan's slow-building intrigue and sense of impending doom deepen in season two, further enriching an already well-acted period drama."

=== Accolades ===
The series won the Primetime Emmy Award for Outstanding Main Title Design for the 67th Primetime Emmy Awards and also won the award for Excellence in Title Design at the 2015 South by Southwest festival. Justin Kirk received a nomination for the Critics' Choice Television Award for Best Guest Performer in a Drama Series for the 6th Critics' Choice Television Awards.
