= The Rule of Four =

2004 novel by Ian Caldwell and Dustin Thomason

- First edition US cover
- Author: Ian Caldwell and Dustin Thomason
- Language: English
- Genre: Novel
- Publisher: The Dial Press
- Publication date: 2004
- Publication place: United States
- Media type: Print (Hardback, Paperback)
- Pages: 384 pp (first edition, hardback)
- ISBN: 0-385-33711-6 (first edition, hardback)
- OCLC: 54006990
- Dewey Decimal: 813/.6 22
- LC Class: PS3603.A435 R85 2004

This article relates to the 2004 novel. For the legal practice, see Rule of four.

The Rule of Four is a novel written by the American authors Ian Caldwell and Dustin Thomason, and published in 2004. Caldwell, a Princeton University graduate, and Thomason, a Harvard College graduate, are childhood friends who wrote the book after their graduations.

The Rule of Four reached the top of the New York Times Bestseller list, where it remained for more than six months.

== Plot summary ==
The book is set on the Princeton campus during Easter weekend in 1999. The story involves four Princeton seniors, both friends and roommates, getting ready for graduation: Tom, Paul, Charlie and Gil. Tom and Paul are trying to solve the mystery contained within an extremely rare and mysterious book, the Hypnerotomachia Poliphili, which was an incunabulum published in 1499 in Venice, Italy; it is a complex allegorical work written in a modified Italian language frequently interspersed with material from other languages as well as its anonymous author's own made-up words.

Tom, the narrator, is the son of a professor who had dedicated his life to the Hypnerotomachia Poliphili. Throughout the novel, he struggles between being fascinated by the book and trying to pull away from the obsession that drew a rift between his father and his mother and is now causing discord between him and his girlfriend, Katie Marchand. Paul Harris is a young scholar who is writing his senior thesis on the Hypnerotomachia and has spent all four of his undergraduate years studying the book and is on the edge of solving the book's mystery. His thesis advisors, Richard Curry and Vincent Taft, were friends and later rivals of Tom's father; Taft and Curry found, stole and concealed documents that provided clues to decode the mysterious book.

The title refers to a cipher that the characters find was used to encode a hidden message in the Hypnerotomachia, which leads to a secret vault in Rome, Italy of books and art that the author, Francesco Colonna, hid to protect them from Girolamo Savonarola's bonfire of the vanities. It also turns out that Paul's friend Bill Stein and his thesis advisor Vincent Taft were conspiring together to steal Paul's thesis and claim credit for it, and the sealed vault of treasures. They were murdered by Paul's wealthy but unstable benefactor Richard Curry to prevent this from happening. In a struggle with Curry that leads to a fire breaking out at Ivy Club, a Princeton eating club of which Gil is the president, Tom escapes but Paul and Curry are assumed to perish. The remains of a fragment of jawbone, found a few days after the tragic fire, ultimately match Curry's dental records, thus concluding that Curry perished when a gas main exploded due to the fire. Although no remains were ever found that would link to Paul's demise, he was assumed dead when he remained missing after some time. Five years later, Tom, who is still traumatized and has had a failed engagement with another woman, receives an authentic ancient (and unknown) Botticelli canvas in the mail with a mysterious return address neatly printed on the mailing tube. A bit of quick research by Tom revealed that the painting was mailed from Florence, Italy. Another mysterious inscription on the tube, GEN4519, catches Tom's attention at once. After puzzling over its meaning, he finally makes the connection. Genesis Ch 45 Verse 19 in the Holy Bible. It says, "...get your father and come," followed by 45:20 "Never mind about your belongings, because the best of all Egypt will be yours." The painting was sent by Paul. The book ends with Tom preparing to pack for a flight to Florence to reunite with Paul.

== Critical reception ==
The book has been well received by critics, with the New York Times Book Review calling it "the ultimate puzzle book", and several others comparing it positively to The Da Vinci Code. It received an aggregate score of 74 out of 100 (based on 17 reviews) on the review aggregator Metacritic.

== See also ==
- Joscelyn Godwin
- Italian literature
- Incunabulum
