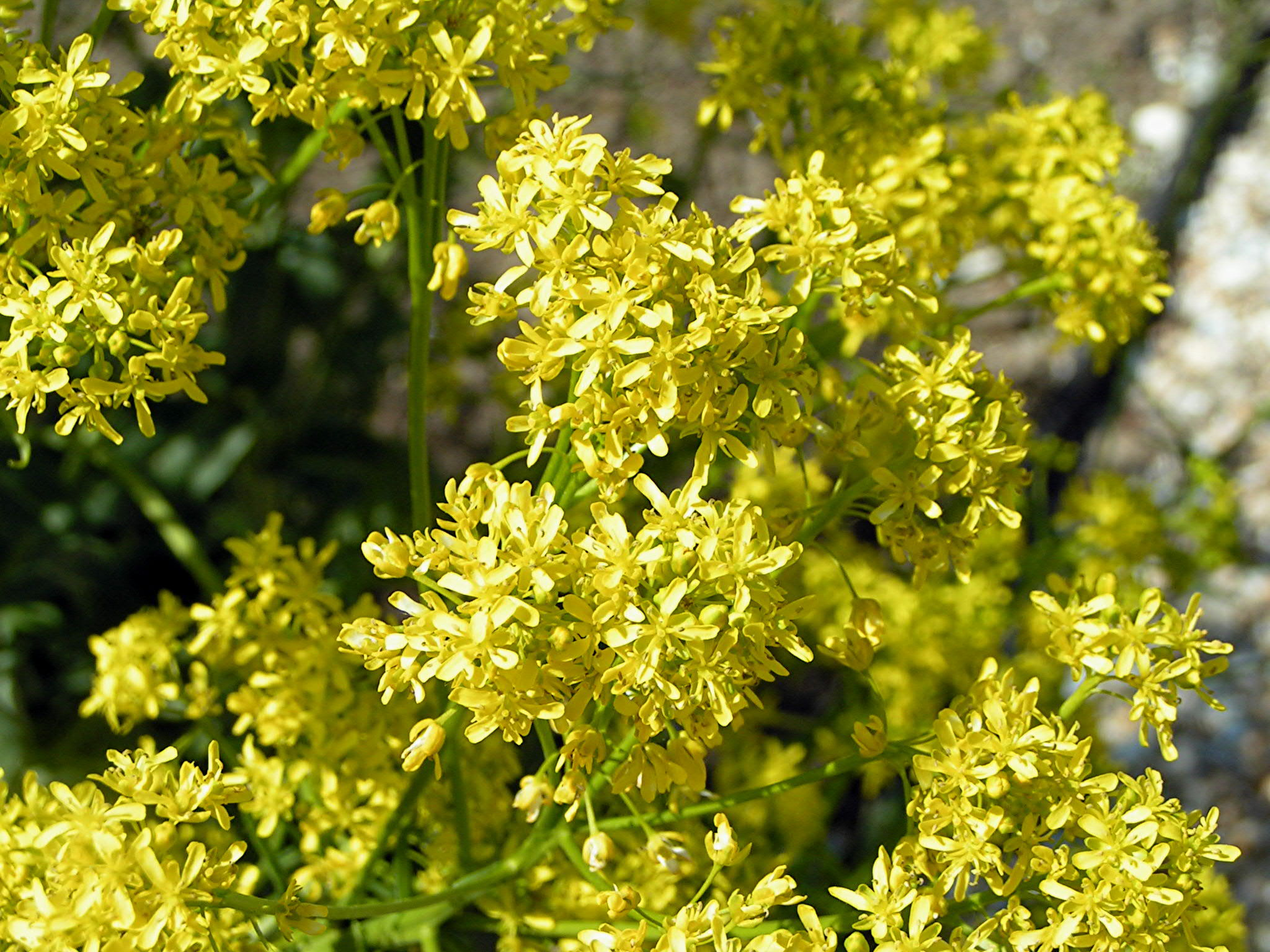
- Woad flowers

Scientific classification
- Kingdom: Plantae
- Clade: Tracheophytes
- Clade: Angiosperms
- Clade: Eudicots
- Clade: Rosids
- Order: Brassicales
- Family: Brassicaceae
- Genus: Isatis
- Species: I. tinctoria

Binomial name
- Isatis tinctoria L.

= Isatis tinctoria =

Species of flowering plant

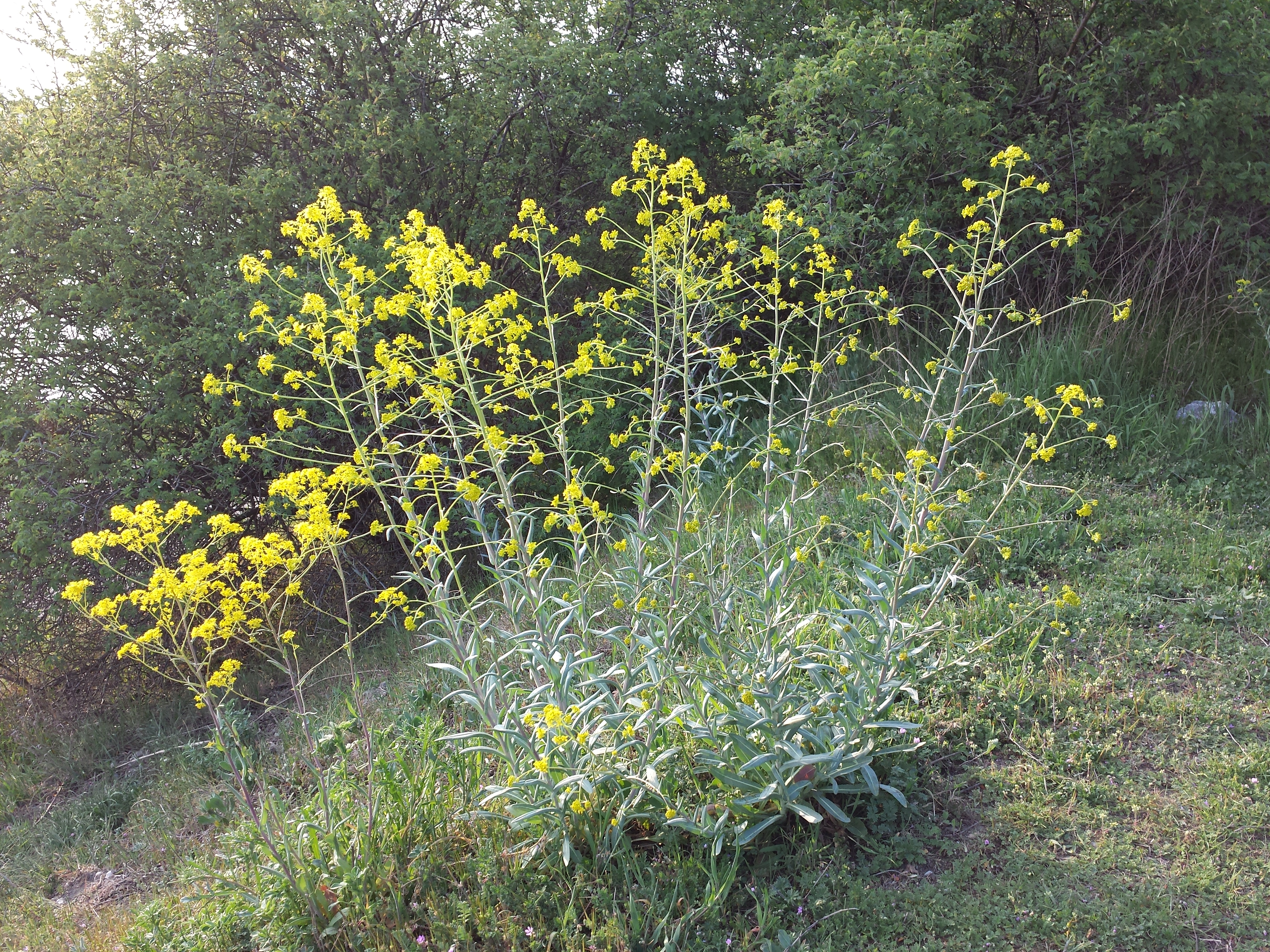
Woad plants

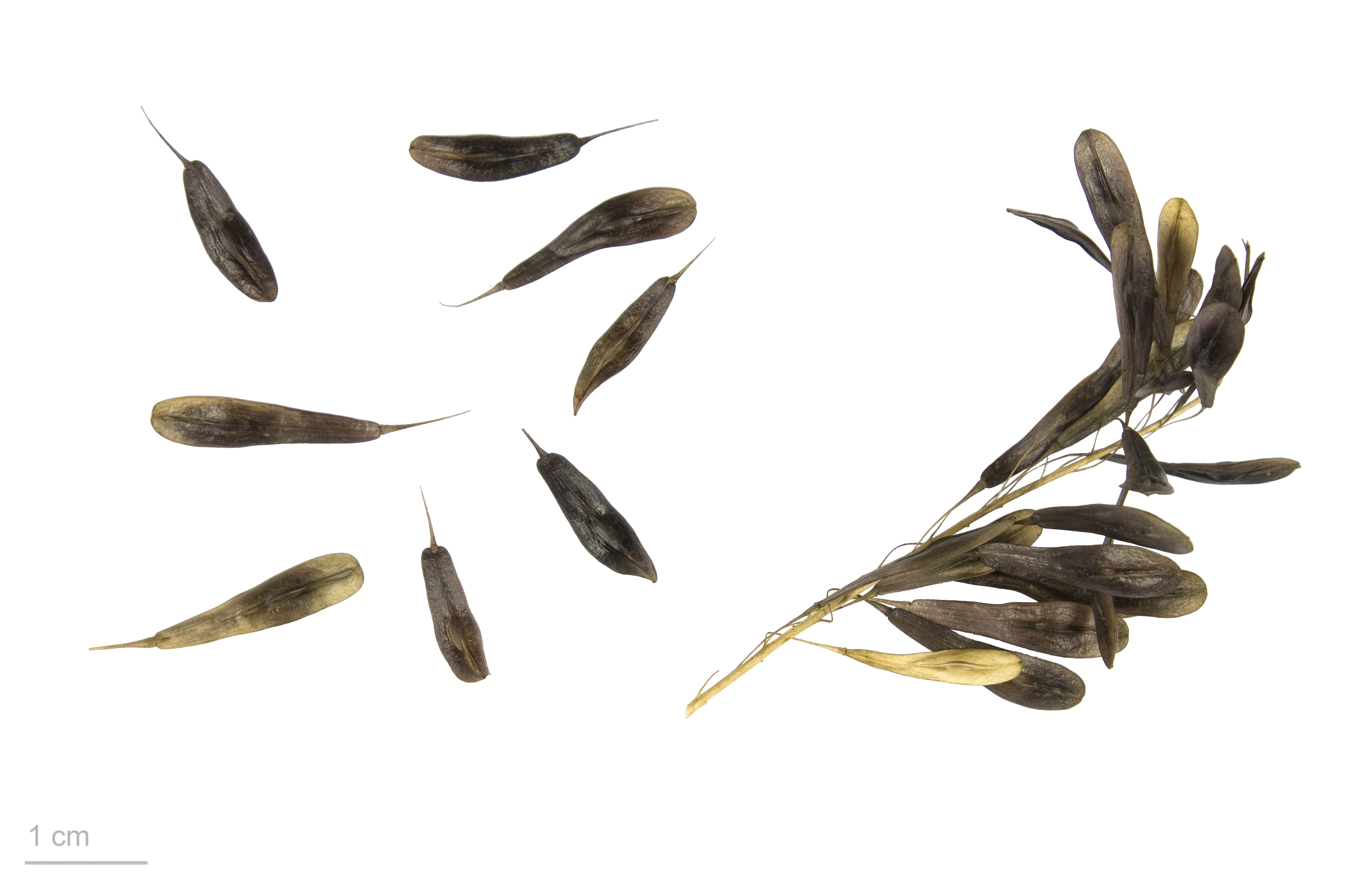
Fruits of Isatis tinctoria

Isatis tinctoria, also called woad (/ˈwoʊd/), dyer's woad, dyer's-weed, or glastum, is a flowering plant in the family Brassicaceae (the mustard family) with a documented history of use as a blue dye and medicinal plant. The double use of woad is seen in its name: the term Isatis is linked to its ancient use to treat wounds; the term tinctoria references its use as a dye. It is occasionally known as Asp of Jerusalem. Woad is also the name of a blue dye produced from the leaves of the plant. Woad is native to the steppe and desert zones of the Caucasus, Central Asia to Eastern Siberia and Western Asia but is now also found in South-Eastern and Central Europe and western North America.

Woad was an important source of blue dye and was cultivated throughout Europe, especially in Western and Southern Europe. In medieval times, there were important woad-growing regions in England, Germany and France. Towns such as Toulouse became prosperous from the woad trade. Over time, woad's cultivation spread across Europe, where it was an important trade good. From the 16th century, indigo (Indigofera tinctoria), a plant from Subsaharan Africa and South and Southeast Asia, started to replace it. In the early 20th century, both woad and Indigofera tinctoria were mostly replaced by synthetic blue dyes, though there has also been some revival of the use of woad for craft purposes.

== History of woad cultivation ==
=== Ancient use ===
The first archaeological finds of woad seeds date to the Neolithic period. The seeds have been found in the cave of l'Audoste, Bouches-du-Rhône, France. Impressions of woad seeds have been reported on pottery in the Iron Age settlement of Heuneburg, Germany. Seed and pod fragments have also been found in an Iron Age pit at Dragonby, North Lincolnshire, United Kingdom. The Hallstatt burials of the Hochdorf Chieftain's Grave and Hohmichele contained textiles dyed with woad. It is highly likely that woad was used as a dye in ancient Egypt.

Much has been made of a passage in Julius Caesar's Commentarii de Bello Gallico (English: Commentaries on the Gallic War) about the appearance of the Britons:

Omnes vero se Britanni vitro inficiunt, quod caeruleum efficit colorem, atque hoc horridiores sunt in pugna aspectu.
All the Britons paint themselves with vitrum, which produces a dark blue color; and for this reason they are much more frightful in appearance in battle.

Vitrum has frequently been translated as "woad" but more typically means "glass". Experimental formulations of body paint made from woad mixed with different binders have yielded colours from "grey-blue, through intense midnight blue, to black". While many have argued that woad was used as a pigment in tattooing, experimental work has been unsuccessful due to its caustic nature. Analysis of the Cheshire bog body Lindow Man from the late Iron Age/early Roman period has revealed that Britons of the time may have used a copper- or iron-based pigment in body decoration.

=== Medieval period onwards ===
Woad was an important dyeing agent in much of Europe and parts of England during the medieval period. However, dye traders began to import indigo during the sixteenth and seventeenth centuries, which threatened to replace locally grown woad as the primary blue dye. The translation of vitrum as woad may date to this period.

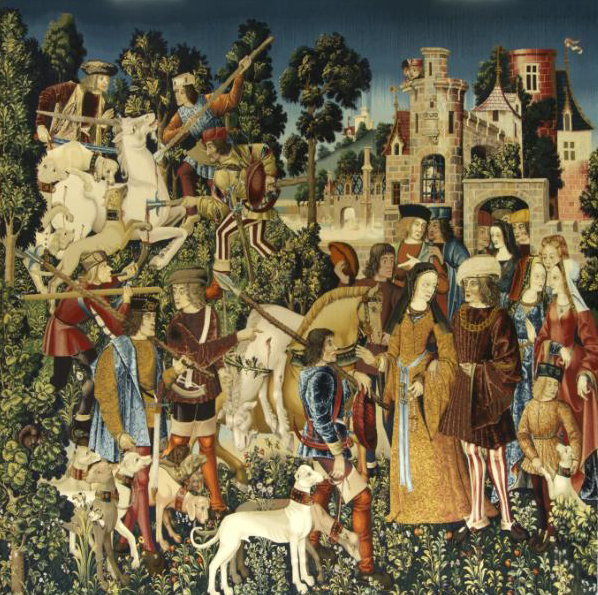
The tapestry series The Hunt of the Unicorn (here No. 6: The Unicorn is Killed and Brought to the Castle, c. 1500), was dyed with weld (yellow), madder (red), and woad (blue).

Woad was one of the three staples of the European dyeing industry, along with weld (yellow) and madder (red). Chaucer mentions their use by the dyer ("litestere") in his poem The Former Age:

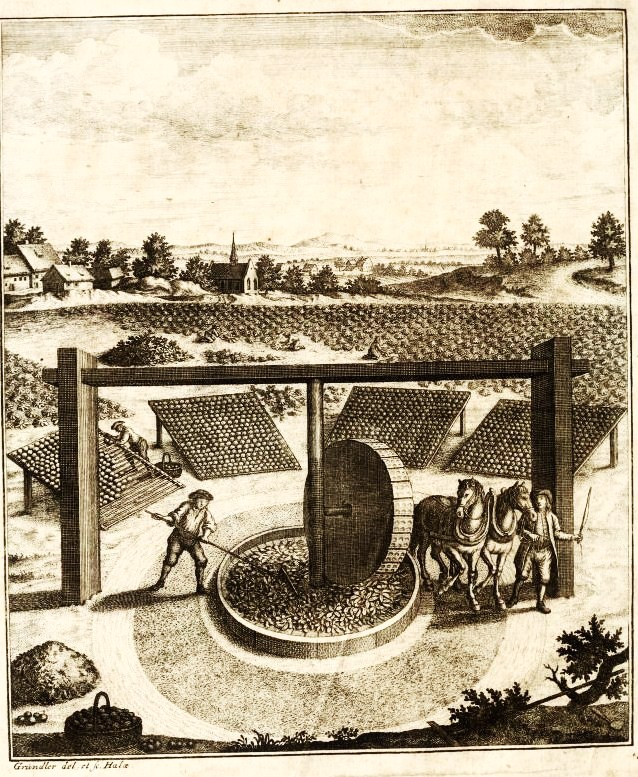
Illustration of German woad mill in Thuringia, 1752.

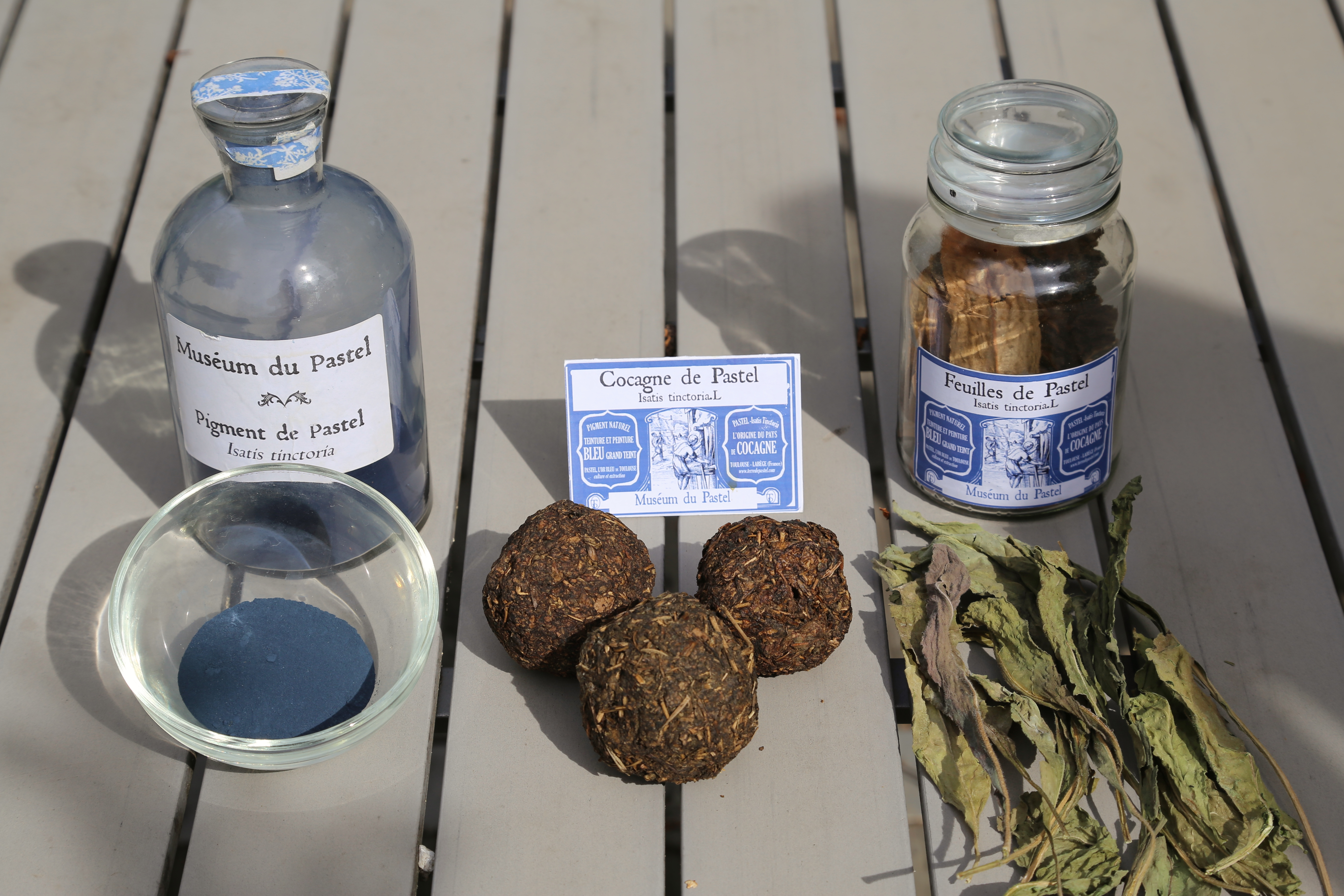
Steps of the leaves to the blue dye.

No mader, welde, or wood no litestere
Ne knew; the flees was of his former hewe;

The three colours can be seen together in tapestries such as The Hunt of the Unicorn (1495–1505), though typically it is the dark blue of the woad that has lasted best. Medieval uses of the dye were not limited to textiles. For example, the illustrator of the Lindisfarne Gospels (c. 720) used a woad-based pigment for blue paint. As does the late 13th century North Italian manual on book illumination Liber colorum secundum magistrum Bernardum describe its usage.

In Viking Age levels at archaeological digs at York, a dye shop with remains of both woad and madder have been excavated and dated to the 10th century. In medieval times, centres of woad cultivation lay in Lincolnshire and Somerset in England, Jülich and the Erfurt area in Thuringia in Germany, Piedmont and Tuscany in Italy, and Gascogne, Normandy, the Somme Basin (from Amiens to Saint-Quentin), Brittany and, above all, Languedoc in France. This last region, in the triangle created by Toulouse, Albi and Carcassonne, known as the Lauragais, was for a long time the biggest producer of woad, or pastel, as it was locally known. One writer commented that "woad [...] hath made that country the happiest and richest in Europe."

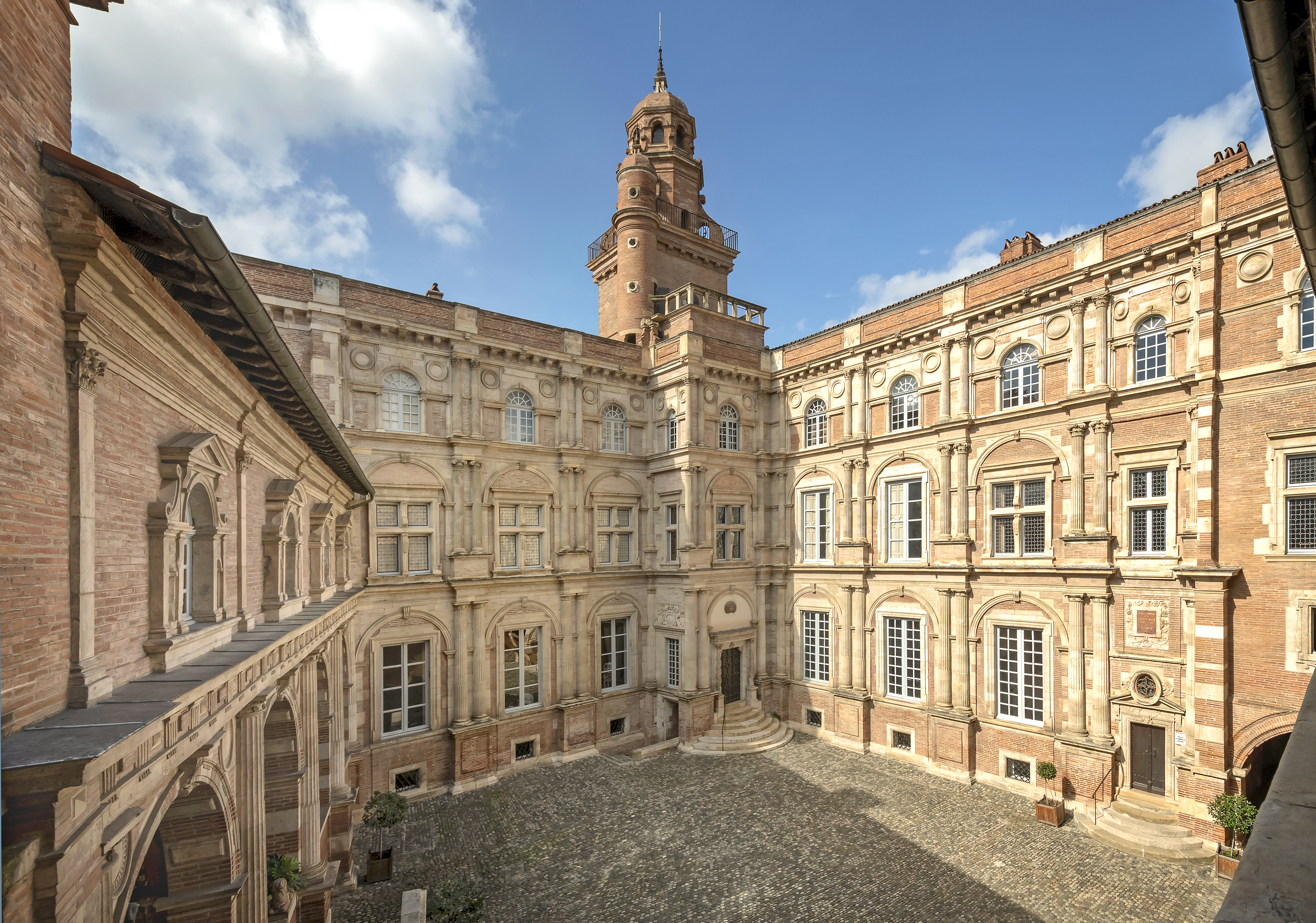
Woad merchant Pierre Assézat's 16th-century mansion in Toulouse.

The woad merchants of Toulouse displayed their affluence in mansions, many of which still stand, such as the Hôtel de Bernuy and the Hôtel d'Assézat. One merchant, Jean de Bernuy, a Spanish Jew who had fled the Spanish Inquisition, was credit-worthy enough to be the main guarantor of the ransomed King Francis I after his capture at the Battle of Pavia by Charles V of Spain. Much of the woad produced here was used for the cloth industry in southern France, but it was also exported via Bayonne, Narbonne and Bordeaux to Flanders, the Low Countries, Italy, and above all Britain and Spain.

After cropping the woad eddish could be let out for grazing sheep. The woad produced in Lincolnshire and Cambridgeshire in the 19th century was shipped out from the Port of Wisbech, Spalding and Boston, both the last to northern mills and the United States. The last portable woad mill was at Parson Drove, Cambridgeshire, Wisbech & Fenland Museum has a woad mill model, photos and other items used in woad production. A major market for woad was at Görlitz in Lausitz. The citizens of the five Thuringian Färberwaid (dye woad) towns of Erfurt, Gotha, Tennstedt, Arnstadt and Langensalza had their own charters. In Erfurt, the woad-traders gave the funds to found the University of Erfurt. Traditional fabric is still printed with woad in Thuringia, Saxony and Lusatia today: it is known as Blaudruck (literally, "blue print(ing)").

In the Marche region, the cultivation of the plant was an important resource for the Duchy of Urbino in Italy. To fully understand the importance of this industry in the State of Urbino, it is enough to read the comprehensive Chapters of the art of wool in 1555, which dictated prescriptions regarding the cultivation and trade of woad, whether in loaves or macerated (powdered). Testifying to the importance that this crop had in the economy in addition to the archival documents was the identification of a hundred millstones surveyed by Delio Bischi in the province of Pesaro and Urbino, the original use of which had become completely unknown as their memory had been lost.

== Woad and indigo ==
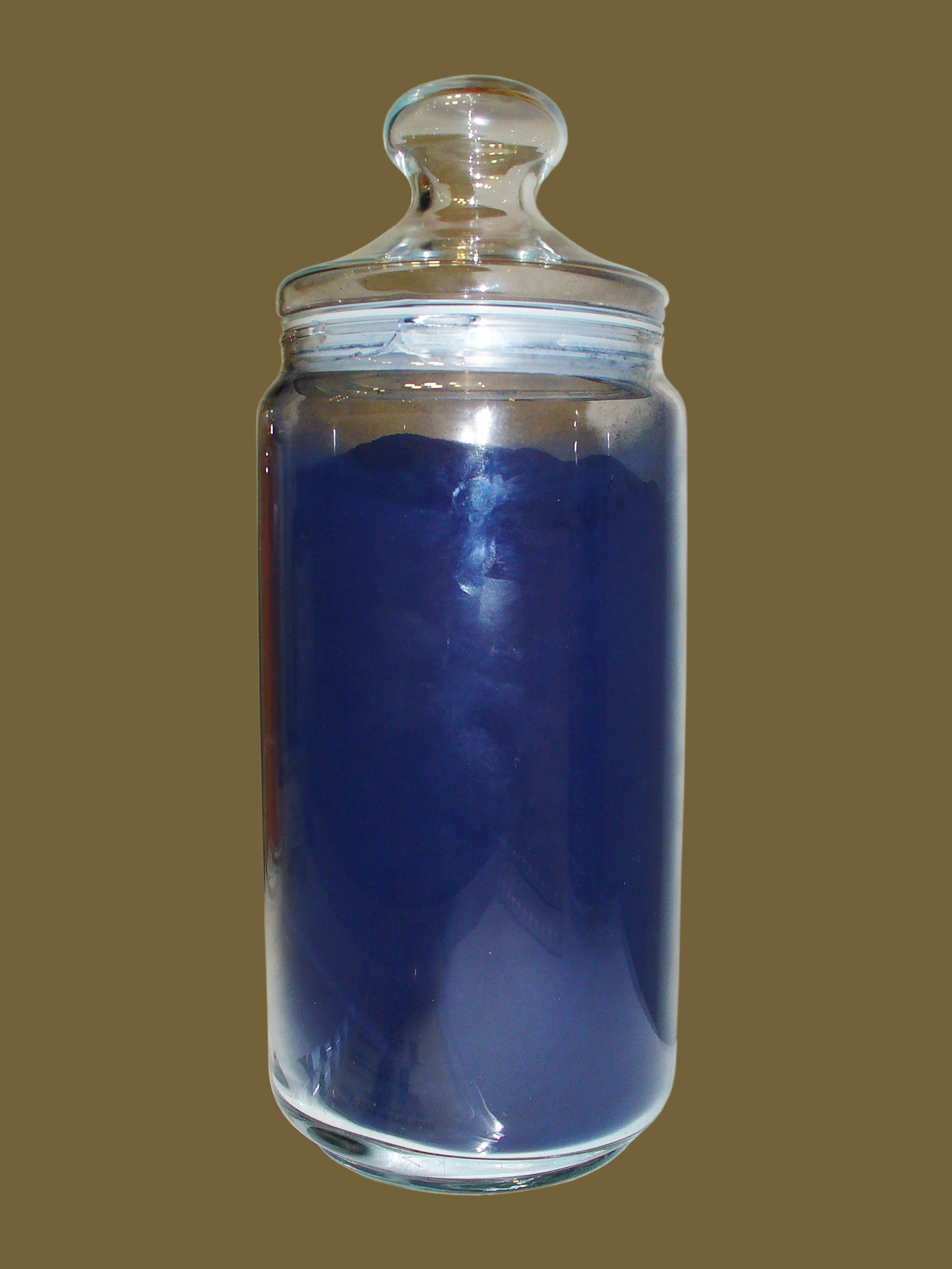
Indigo extracted from woad

The dye chemical extracted from woad is indigo, the same dye extracted from "true indigo", Indigofera tinctoria, but in a lower concentration. Following the Portuguese discovery of the sea route to India by the navigator Vasco da Gama in 1498, great amounts of indigo were imported from Asia. Laws were passed in some parts of Europe to protect the woad industry from the competition of the indigo trade. It was proclaimed that indigo caused yarns to rot. This prohibition was repeated in 1594 and again in 1603. In France, Henry IV, in an edict of 1609, punished by death the use of "the false and pernicious Indian drug".

With the development of a chemical process to synthesize the pigment, both the woad and natural indigo industries collapsed in the first years of the 20th century. The last commercial harvest of woad until recent times occurred in 1932, in Lincolnshire, Britain. Small amounts of woad are now grown in the UK and France to supply craft dyers. The classic book about woad is The Woad Plant and its Dye by J. B. Hurry, Oxford University Press of 1930, which contains an extensive bibliography.

A method for producing blue dye from woad is described in The History of Woad and the Medieval Woad Vat (1998) ISBN 0-9534133-0-6.

Woad is biodegradable and safe in the environment. In Germany, there have been attempts to use it to protect wood against decay without applying dangerous chemicals. Production of woad is increasing in the UK for use in inks, particularly for inkjet printers, and dyes.

== Invasive and noxious weed ==
In certain locations, the plant is classified as a non-native and invasive weed. It is listed as a noxious weed by the agriculture departments of several states in the western United States: Arizona, California, Colorado, Idaho, Montana, Nevada, New Mexico, Oregon, Utah, Washington, and Wyoming. In Montana, it has been the target of an extensive, and largely successful, eradication attempt.
