= David Saltzberg =

American physicist and television script consultant

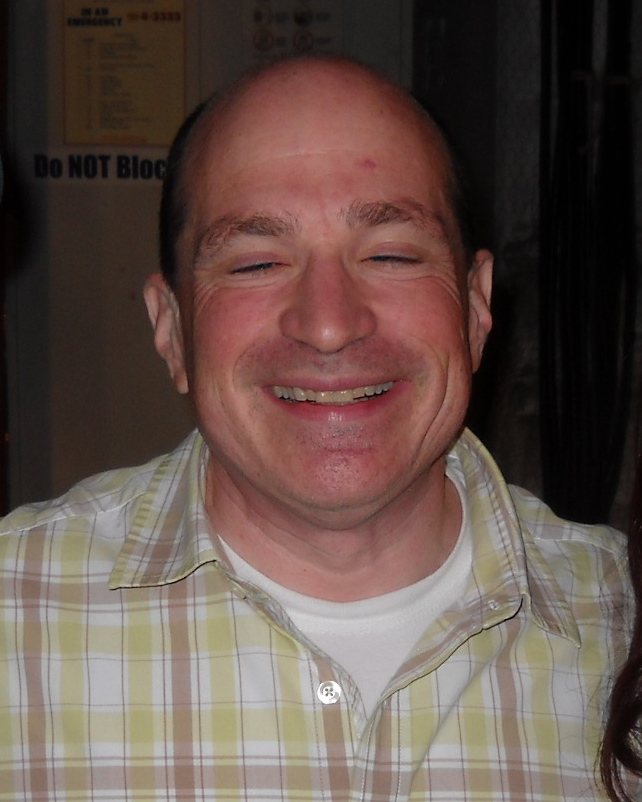
- Physicist and script consultant David Saltzberg.
- Born: David Paul Saltzberg
- Education: Princeton University (B.S.); University of Chicago (Ph.D.)
- Known for: Experimental particle physics Scientific consultancy
- Scientific career
- Fields: Particle physics
- Workplaces: CERN; UCLA
- Thesis: Measurement of the W Boson Mass (1994)
- Doctoral advisor: Henry Frisch
- Website: www.physics.ucla.edu/~saltzberg/

David Paul Saltzberg is an experimental particle physicist and a professor at the University of California, Los Angeles, who is known for his science consultancy work on various television shows and films, such as The Big Bang Theory, Young Sheldon, Manhattan and Oppenheimer. His research involves high-energy collider physics and the radio detection of cosmic neutrinos, and in 2018, he was inducted as a fellow of the American Physical Society.

== Early life, family and education ==
Saltzberg earned a bachelor's degree in physics in 1989 from Princeton University. He earned his Ph.D. in physics from the University of Chicago in 1994.

== Career ==
From 1995 to 1997, Saltzberg worked at CERN in Switzerland.

He served as the chair of the UCLA physics and astronomy department from 2018 to 2022.

=== Scientific consultancy ===
Saltzberg was a technical director for the CBS comedy The Big Bang Theory. In addition to reviewing and correcting scripts with technical errors, Saltzberg added complex formulas to whiteboards on set. He also arranged for established scientists to visit the set of The Big Bang Theory through his "Geek of the Week" program. Saltzberg also served as a science consultant on the WGN America series Manhattan, and the 2023 film Oppenheimer.

In the final scene of The Big Bang Theory's prequel series, Young Sheldon, Saltzberg made a guest appearance as a physics professor.

== Honors and awards ==
Saltzberg received a Sloan Fellowship, NSF Career Award, and Department of Energy Outstanding Junior Investigator Award while an assistant professor.

In 2015, the asteroid 8628 Davidsaltzberg was named after him.

In 2018, Saltzberg was inducted as a fellow of the American Physical Society for "multiple contributions to hadron collider physics research; and for searches for PeV-ZeV astrophysical neutrinos, including accelerator experiments to establish the existence and viability of the Askaryan effect for this purpose".

In 2023, Saltzberg, together with Peter Gorham, a professor from the University of Hawaii, was awarded the Division of Particles & Fields (DPF) Instrumentation Award from the American Physical Society. The award was given for their work on methodologies used to detect high-energy particle cascades based on the Askaryan effect, which was subsequently used in the search for petaelectronvolt (PeV) and exaelectronvolt (EeV) astrophysical neutrinos.
