= Alexander Moosbrugger =

- Born: August 21, 1972 (age 52); Bregenzerwald, Austria
- Years active: 1990s – present
- Website: Moosbrugger Website

Alexander Moosbrugger (born 21 August 1972 in Bregenzerwald) is an Austrian composer, living since 2001 in Berlin.

== Biography ==
Alexander Moosbrugger completed studies at the Vorarlberger Landeskonservatorium (organ and harpsichord), at the Universität Wien (Philosophy) and at the Staatliche Hochschule für Musik und Darstellende Kunst Stuttgart.

== Characteristic musical concerns ==
Moosbrugger's work encompasses a fine differentiation of the entire soft dynamic range. He primarily is writing in chamber ensemble settings, rarely doubled, preferring among other genres the string quartet. In the foreground of a composition Moosbrugger interweaves auditory and non-auditory sources, establishing musical relations through translations of historical, sociopolitical and private points of reference, analysis of symbolic functions, the devising of intonations, and "reconceived instrumental practices". Playing techniques manifest the "speaking" of musical images and are devised anew in each piece, or series of works.

His compositions are internationally played, for example in the Konzerthaus Berlin or at King's College, Cambridge, in festivals of contemporary music (2013 at the London Ear Festival, Forum Neue Musik Luzern) and in ensemble concert series. Among interpreters of his music are Klangforum Wien, ensemble recherche, Ensemble Phoenix Basel, Kammerensemble Neue Musik Berlin, Ensemble Cairn Paris, musikFabrik, Ensemble L'arsenale, das Arditti String Quartet, Pellegrini Quartet, Herbert Henck.

== Works ==
- Wind, opera for solists, string quartet and oragan, text by the composer taken from the Hypnerotomachia Poliphili in the translation by Joscelyn Godwin and Thomas Reiser (2021)
- Fonds, Schach, Basar for six or seven players. Flutes, [contra-] bass clarinet, percussion, piano, violin and violoncello [or contrabass, ad lib.], fonds and turntable (2012-2013)
- Zwei Quartett-Sätze – Silben, Skalen, Nacht and Licht, Steg (revised 2012)
- Sprechstück nach Nietzsche for seven voices and text projectors (2001-2011)
- de Grigny, Hymnus „Ave maris stella“ from „Premier livre d'orgue“ by Nicolas de Grigny, transcribed for ensemble – oboe, clarinet, bassoon, trumpet, trombone, tuba, string quartet (2010)
- 4 Orgelstücke für Paris – Conservatoire, Notre-Dame-de-la-Croix de Ménilmontant, Saint-Sulpice, La Trinité (2010)
- Silben, Skalen, Nacht for bass clarinet, piano, violin, violoncello (2009)
- Selinunt for orchestra, second movement (2007-2010)
- Skalen, Texte, Maß for flute, bass clarinet, violin, violoncello (2009)
- Jemand sagt >bleib!<, Suite in fünf Gedanken for two bass clarinets and confetti shooters (2008)
- Folge, Skalen, Text for bass clarinet, two violins, violoncello (2008)
- Zwei Linien for violin and violoncello (2007)
- hypnos eros mache for flutes, [contra-] bass clarinet, violin 1, violin 2, violoncello, percussion, 8 medicine ball players (2007)
- In Perfection for video tape / piano (2006)
- books – Encore for piano (2005)
- Teint for oboe/cor anglais (ad lib.), bass clarinet, violin, violoncello (scordatura C/G1), percussion (2005)
- Licht, Steg – Intonationsmusik for string quartet (2004)
- Tunnelmusik for violin I, violin II, viola, violoncello (2001)
- F 'U' R – Hangmusik – baroque violin, baroque cello, harpsichord/organ/piano, flute, soprano, clarinet, percussion, church bells (St. Gallus, Bregenz), ensemble on period instruments for early music (baruque trumpet, violin, viola, violoncello, theorbo), ensemble with 12 players (flute, oboe, [contra-] bassoon, French horn, cornetto, trombone, percussion, violin 1, violin 2, viola, violoncello, contrabass), MIDI controlled organ pipe D 32’ (2001)

== Research and Curatorial Projects ==
Moosbrugger's concern with "Listening/Hearing" as compositional arena motivated studies in philosophy at the Universität Wien. Since then, he researches and works with aspects of hearing as sounding reflections about the history of philosophy. For the Orpheus Instituut in Ghent Moosbrugger led „Gespräche zum Hören“ with Rebecca Saunders, Georg Friedrich Haas and Salvatore Sciarrino. Teaching and guest lectures at the Anton Bruckner Privatuniversität and Universität der Künste Berlin.

Moosbrugger initiated and curated the festival reihe 0 – Tage aus Kunst from 2000 until 2008, and since 2007 is Artistic Director of the Bludenzer Tage zeitgemäßer Musik.

== Awards, Recognition ==
Alexander Moosbrugger has received divers stipendia, among them the International Bodenseepreis Sparte Zeitgenössische Komposition, the Austrian state stipend for composition as well as the composition prize of the Land Vorarlberg. Moosbrugger was Artist in Residence in the Domus Artium near Rome and resident artist in the Centro Tedesco di Studi Veneziani.
