= Francesco Colonna (writer) =

Italian priest, monk, and writer

- Franciscus Columna
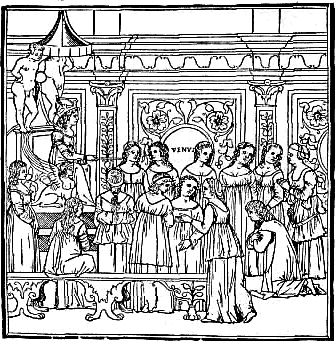
- Hypnerotomachia Poliphili illustration (1499)

Personal life
- Born: 1433 Venice, Italy
- Died: 1527 (aged 93–94) Venice, Italy
- Notable work: Hypnerotomachia Poliphili

Religious life
- Religion: Catholic religion
- Order: Dominican Order
- Church: Santi Giovanni e Paolo, Venice
- School: St Mark's Basilica
- Lineage: Colonna
- Profession: Priest and monk

Francesco Colonna (1433/1434 – 1527) was an Italian Dominican priest and monk who was credited with the authorship of the Hypnerotomachia Poliphili by an acrostic formed by initial letters of the text.

He lived in Venice, and preached at St. Mark's Cathedral. Besides Hypnerotomachia Poliphili, he definitely wrote a Latin epic poem, Delfili Somnium (the "Dream of Delfilo"), which went unpublished in his lifetime and was not published until 1959. Colonna spent part of his life in the monastery of San Giovanni e Paolo in Venice, but the monastery was apparently not of the strictest observance and Colonna was granted leave to live outside its walls. In Ian Caldwell's and Dustin Thomason's novel The Rule of Four, the Roman noble of the same name, Francesco Colonna, is featured as the true author of the Hypnerotomachia Poliphili.
