= Ian Caldwell =

American novelist

- Born: March 18, 1976 (age 50); Fairfax County, Virginia, U.S.
- Education: Thomas Jefferson High School for Science and Technology; Princeton University
- Occupation: Novelist
- Spouse: Meredith
- Children: Ethan, Jude, Luke
- Writing career
- Language: English
- Genres: Historical Fiction, Thriller, Mystery
- Notable works: The Rule of Four; The Fifth Gospel
- Website: Facebook Page

Ian Mackinnon Caldwell (born March 18, 1976) is an American novelist known for co-authoring the 2004 novel The Rule of Four. His second book, The Fifth Gospel, was published in 2015.

== Early life and education ==
Caldwell was born on January 1, 1976, in Fairfax County, Virginia, where he later met his future writing collaborator, Dustin Thomason. Both graduated from the Thomas Jefferson High School for Science and Technology in 1994. Caldwell graduated Phi Beta Kappa with an A.B. in history from Princeton University in 1998 after completing an 127-page-long senior thesis, titled The French Popular Front and the Debate over Intervention in the Spanish Civil War, under the supervision of Thomas J. Dandelet.

== Career ==
After college, while working with Thomason on their first novel, Caldwell worked at MicroStrategy in Tyson Corner and taught test preparation for Kaplan, Inc. in Blacksburg. Caldwell is married to his wife, Meredith, who earned her DVM at Virginia Tech. The couple lived in Newport News, Virginia, before moving to Vienna, Virginia. The couple has three children, Ethan, Jude, and Luke.

Upon graduating from their respective colleges, Caldwell began working with Thomason on the novel The Rule of Four. After writing together for a summer, the two continued to collaborate online and by telephone for the next five years. The plot centers on four Princeton seniors attempting to solve a mystery related to the Hypnerotomachia Poliphili, an Italian work from the early Renaissance. The book was published by Dial Press in 2004, spent 49 weeks on The New York Times Best Seller list and has sold almost 2 million copies. It was often compared to Dan Brown's novel The Da Vinci Code due to its similar style of teaching history through a fictional plot as well as the proximity in date of publication.

It took Caldwell ten years to complete his second work, The Fifth Gospel, which was published by Simon & Schuster in 2015. This solo work tells the fictional story of two brothers, both priests, exploring the Diatessaron, the "fifth" gospel, and how it might lead to reconciliation between the Roman Catholic and Eastern Orthodox churches.
