= Commentary (philology) =

In philology, a commentary is a line-by-line or even word-by-word explication usually attached to an edition of a text in the same or an accompanying volume. It may draw on methodologies of close reading and literary criticism, but its primary purpose is to elucidate the language of the text and the specific culture that produced it, both of which may be foreign to the reader. Such a commentary usually takes the form of footnotes, endnotes, or separate text cross-referenced by line, paragraph or page.

Means of providing commentary on the language of the text include notes on textual criticism, syntax and semantics, and the analysis of rhetoric, literary tropes, and style. The aim is to remove, lessen or point out linguistic obstacles to reading and understanding the text.

If a text is historical, or is produced within a culture assumed to be of limited familiarity to a reader, a broader range of issues may require elucidation. These include, but are by no means limited to, biographical data pertaining to the author, historical events, customs and laws, technical terminology and facts of daily life, religious beliefs and philosophical perspectives, literary allusions, geographical settings, and cross-references to related passages in the same work, other works by the author, or sources used by the author.

Some commentaries from Classical Antiquity or the Middle Ages (more strictly referred to as scholia) are a valuable source of information otherwise unknown, including references to works that are now lost. Jerome provides a list of several commentaries that were in use during his days as a student in the 350s A.D. One of the most used of the ancient scholia today is that of Servius on Vergil’s Aeneid, written in the 4th century.

The production of commentaries began to flourish in the 16th century as part of the humanist project to recover the texts of antiquity, with its related boom in publishing. In the modern era, a commentary differs from an annotated edition aimed at students or the casual reader in that it attempts to address an exhaustive range of scholarly questions, many of which may be of concern or interest primarily to specialists. The commentator may take a position on variant readings of the text or on a point of scholarly dispute, but arguments are usually succinct, a paragraph or less than a page in length.

== Mesopotamian commentaries ==
The earliest examples, and also one of the largest corpora of text commentaries from the ancient world, comes from first-millennium-BCE Mesopotamia (modern Iraq). Known from over 860 manuscripts, the majority of which date to the period 700–100 BCE, most of these commentaries explore numerous types of texts, including literary works (such as the Babylonian Epic of Creation), medical treatises, magical texts, ancient dictionaries, and law collections (the Code of Hammurabi). Most of them, however, comment on divination treatises, in particular treatises that predict the future from the appearance and movement of celestial bodies on the one hand (Enūma Anu Enlil), and from the appearance of a sacrificed sheep’s liver on the other (Bārûtu).

As with the majority of the thousands of texts from the ancient Near East that have survived to the present day, Mesopotamian text commentaries are written on clay tablets in cuneiform script. Text commentaries are written in the East Semitic language of Akkadian, but due to the influence of lexical lists written in Sumerian language on cuneiform scholarship, they often contain Sumerian words or phrases as well.

Cuneiform commentaries are important because they provide information about Mesopotamian languages and culture that are not available elsewhere in the cuneiform record. To give but one example, the pronunciation of the cryptically written name of Gilgamesh, the hero of the Epic of Gilgamesh, was discovered in a cuneiform commentary on a medical text. However, the significance of cuneiform commentaries extends beyond the light they shed on specific details of Mesopotamian civilization. They open a window onto what the concerns of the Mesopotamian literate elite were when they read some of the most widely studied texts in the Mesopotamian intellectual tradition, a perspective that is important for “seeing things their way.” Finally, cuneiform commentaries are also the earliest examples of textual interpretation. It has been repeatedly argued that they influenced rabbinical exegesis. See Akkadian Commentaries and Early Hebrew Exegesis

The publication and interpretation of these texts began in the mid-nineteenth century, with the discovery of the royal Assyrian libraries at Nineveh, from which ca. 454 text commentaries have been recovered. The study of cuneiform commentaries is, however, far from complete. It is the subject of ongoing research by the small, international community of scholars who specialize in the field of Assyriology.

== Online commentaries ==
- Dickinson College Commentaries "DCC publishes born digital scholarly commentaries on classical texts intended to provide an effective reading and learning experience for classicists at all levels of experience." It currently contains commentaries on selections from Caesar (ed. Christopher Francese), Ovid (ed. William Turpin), Cornelius Nepos (ed. Bret Mulligan), Sulpicius Severus (ed. Christopher Francese), Lucian (ed. Eric Casey, Evan Hayes, and Stephen Nimis), and Vergil (eds. Christopher Francese and Meghan Reedy)
- The Vergil Project is a resource for students, teachers, and readers of Vergil's Aeneid. It offers an online hypertext linked to interpretive materials of various kinds. These include basic information about grammar, syntax, and diction; several commentaries; an apparatus criticus; help with scansion; and other resources.
- Cuneiform Commentaries Project, a research project led by Professor Eckart Frahm, and sponsored by Yale University and the National Endowment for the Humanities. The website includes an up-to-date catalogue and dozens of annotated editions, as well as introductory essays (including essays on the hermeneutic techniques used by the commentaries and the relationship between cuneiform commentaries and early Hebrew exegesis); photographs of the manuscripts (i.e., clay tablets), including those yet to be edited; and guides to further readings.

== See also ==
- Exegesis
- Literary criticism
- Philology
- Scholia
- Textual criticism
- Textual scholarship

== Bibliography ==
- Cameron, Alan. Greek Mythography in the Roman World. Oxford University Press, 2004. ISBN 0-19-517121-7. New perspectives on the purpose and use of scholia and annotations within the Roman intellectual milieu.
- Frahm, Eckart. Babylonian and Assyrian Text Commentaries. Origins of Interpretation (Guides to the Mesopotamian Textual Record 5; Münster: Ugarit-Verlag, 2011).
- Gibson, Roy K.; Shuttleworth Kraus, Christina (2002). The Classical Commentary: Histories, Practices, Theory (limited preview). Brill. ISBN 90-04-12153-6.
- vergil.classics.upenn.edu
- dcc.dickinson.edu
- Wilson, Nigel (2007). "Scholiasts and commentators." Greek, Roman, and Byzantine Studies 47.1.
