= Dickinson College Commentaries =

Digital project of Dickinson College

Dickinson College Commentaries is a digital project of Dickinson College, which is located in Carlisle, near Harrisburg, in the U.S. state of Pennsylvania. The project assembles digital commentaries on texts in Latin and ancient Greek and publishes core vocabularies of the most common words in those languages. It is hosted by the department of Classical Studies.

== History ==
In 2010 DCC launched a pilot site in MediaWiki that was dedicated to notes on the selections from Gallic Wars used in the American Advanced Placement Latin Exam. The site moved to Drupal in 2012. The project director is Christopher Francese, the Asbury J. Clarke Professor of Classical Studies at Dickinson College.

== Peer Review ==
Commentary proposals are reviewed and edited in a process similar to that used by traditional academic print publishers.

== Copyright status ==
Dickinson College Commentaries supports open-source content, and publishes all content under a Creative Commons CC-BY-SA license.
