= Dustin Thomason =

American author, screenwriter, and producer

- Born: Dustin Elliott Thomason; February 17, 1976 (age 50)
- Occupations: Novelist; Screenwriter; Producer
- Spouse: Marie-Aimée Brajeux
- Children: 1
- Writing career
- Notable works: The Evidence; Lie to Me; Manhattan; Castle Rock; Presumed Innocent

Dustin Thomason (born February 17, 1976) is an American writer and producer who co-authored the New York Times bestselling historical fiction novel The Rule of Four with Ian Caldwell. He is the co-founder of Curiosity Media, a film and television production and financing company.

== Novels ==
Thomason began his career as a novelist. He is a co-author of the 2004 novel The Rule of Four, and the author of 12.21. The Rule of Four hit the top of the New York Times Best Seller list, where it remained for six months, sold more than four million copies, and was the best selling debut novel of the decade. 12.21 (concerning the 2012 phenomenon) was also a New York Times and International bestseller.

== Television career ==
Thomason co-created and was showrunner of Hulu's Castle Rock, for which he won the 2019 Writers Guild of America award for long form original television. He also co-created ABC drama The Evidence and wrote and executive produced Fox's Lie to Me and WGN America's critically acclaimed Manhattan. He is currently the Executive Producer of the Apple TV+'s series Presumed Innocent, and Netflix's upcoming Kennedy starring Michael Fassbender.

== Personal life ==
Thomason attended Thomas Jefferson High School for Science and Technology in Fairfax County, Virginia, then went on to study anthropology at Harvard University and received his M.D. and his MBA from Columbia University in 2003. He lives and works in Los Angeles, California.

He was childhood friends with Rule of Four coauthor Ian Caldwell, whom he first collaborated with in elementary school.
