= List of Princeton University people =

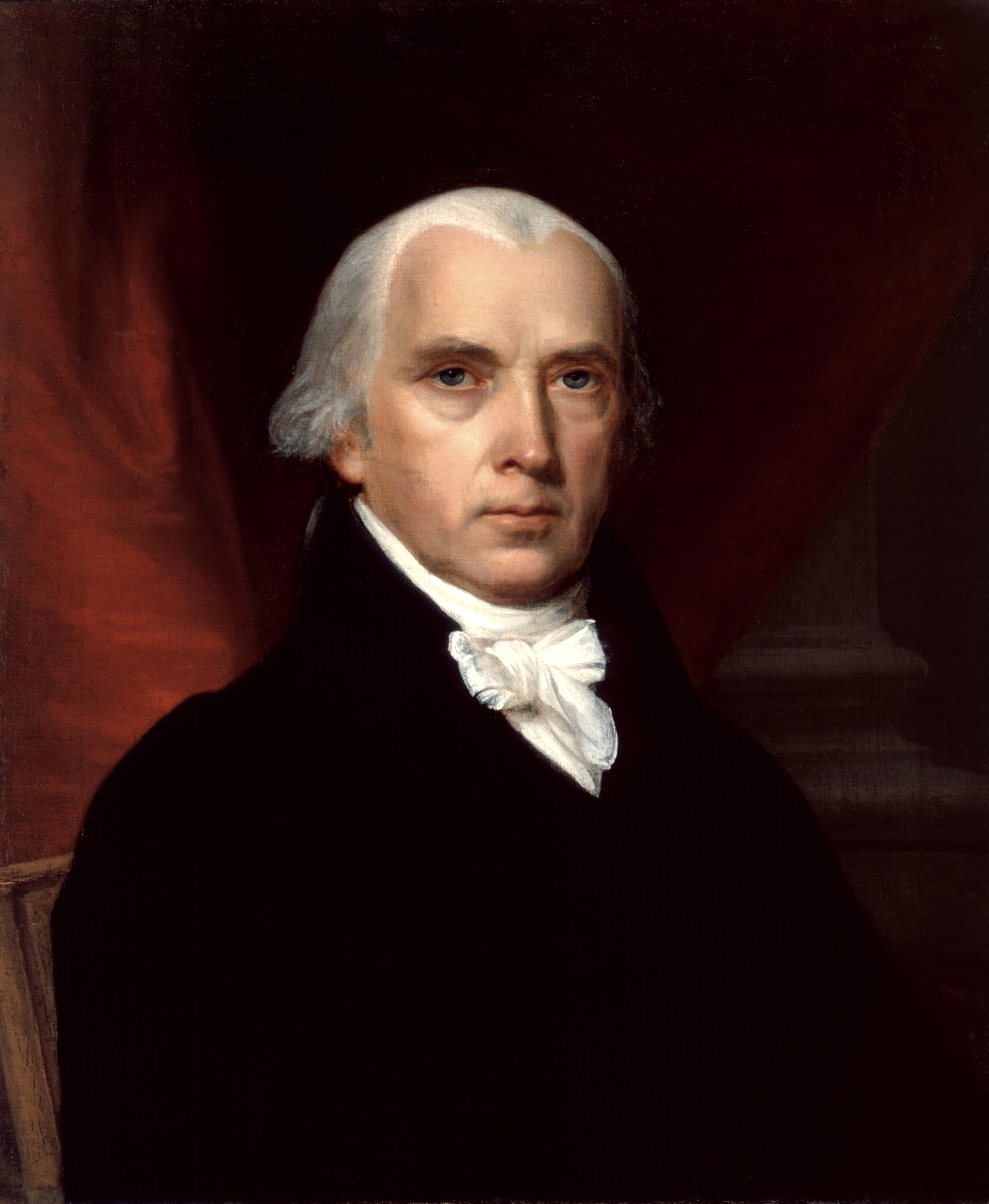
James Madison, "father" of the U.S. Constitution, fourth president of the United States, member of the Princeton Class of 1771, and Princeton's first graduate student

This list of Princeton University people include notable alumni (graduates and attendees) or faculty members (professors of various ranks, researchers, and visiting lecturers or professors) affiliated with Princeton University. People who have given public lectures, talks or non-curricular seminars; studied as non-degree students; received honorary degrees; or served as administrative staff at the university are excluded from the list. Summer school attendees and visitors are generally excluded from the list, since summer terms are not part of formal academic years.

Individuals are sorted by category and alphabetized within each category. The "Affiliation" fields in the tables in this list indicate the person's affiliation with Princeton and use the following notation:

- B indicates a bachelor's degree
- Att indicates that the person attended the undergraduate program but may not have graduated
- AM indicates a Master of Arts degree
- MPP indicates a Master of Public Policy degree awarded by the Princeton School of Public and International Affairs
- MPA indicates a Master in Public Affairs degree awarded by the Princeton School of Public and International Affairs
- MCF indicates completion of the Mid-Career Fellowship, a discontinued non-degree program of the Woodrow Wilson School
- MSE indicates a Master of Science in Engineering degree awarded by the School of Engineering and Applied Science
- PhD indicates a Ph.D. degree
- GS indicates that the person was a graduate student but may not have received a degree
- F indicates a faculty member, followed by years denoting the time of service on the faculty
- VS indicates a visiting scholar, followed by years of stay
- T indicates a trustee of Princeton University, followed by years denoting the time of service
- Pres indicates a president of Princeton University, followed by years denoting the time of service

== Royalty ==
- Kyril, Prince of Preslav
- Prince Ali bin Hussein of the Hashemite Kingdom of Jordan
- Prince Ghazi bin Muhammad
- Prince Moulay Hicham of Morocco
- Queen Noor of Jordan
- Prince Turki bin Faisal Al Saud

== Military ==
- James Millikin Bevans – U.S. Air Force major general
- Alexander Bonnyman Jr., 1932 – World War II Medal of Honor recipient killed in the Battle of Tarawa
- William L. Brandon, 1819 – Confederate Army general
- James Caldwell, A.B. 1759 – American Revolutionary soldier and chaplain
- Christopher G. Cavoli, A.B. 1987 – commander, United States European Command
- James Robb Church, 1888 – Medal of Honor recipient, Spanish–American War
- Kenneth F. Cramer, B.Litt. 1916, M.A. 1917 – United States Army Major General and chief of the National Guard Bureau
- William J. Crowe (1925–2007), Ph.D. 1965 – U.S. Navy admiral, chairman of Joint Chiefs of Staff and American ambassador to Great Britain
- Philip Dalton (1903–1941) M.S. 1925 – naval aviator and engineer, creator of E6-B analog flight computer
- Glen Edwards, M.S. 1947 – U.S. Air Force test pilot
- Joseph C. Fegan Jr., B.A. 1943 – United States Marine Corps lieutenant general; World War II, Korea and Vietnam
- Andrew Goodpaster, A.M. 1949, M.S.E. 1949, Ph.D. 1950 – supreme allied commander, Europe for NATO
- Gordon Johnston, A.B. 1896 – Medal of Honor recipient, Philippine–American War
- Fumitaka Konoe – son of Japanese Prime Minister Fumimaro Konoe and lieutenant in the Imperial Japanese Army in World War II
- Henry "Lighthorse Harry" Lee, A.B. 1773 – American Revolutionary cavalry officer, father of Robert E. Lee
- Mark A. Milley, A.B. 1980 – U.S. Army general, 20th chairman of the Joint Chiefs of Staff
- David Petraeus, M.P.A. 1985 Ph.D. 1987 – former commander of International Security Assistance Force (ISAF) and United States Forces Afghanistan (USFOR-A), USCENTCOM, and Multi-National Force – Iraq; former director of the Central Intelligence Agency
- Nathaniel Scudder – physician and patriot leader during the Revolutionary War
- Elliott White Springs, A.B. 1917 – World War I flying ace and memoirist
- Blake Wayne Van Leer, M.S. 1959 – commander and captain in the U.S. Navy; led SeaBee program and the nuclear research and power unit at McMurdo Station during Operation Deep Freeze
- Tamon Yamaguchi, 1921–1923 – Japanese admiral

== Academia ==
This section includes lists of notable academics who graduated from Princeton and notable Princeton faculty members.

=== Alumni and students ===
Name	Field	Affiliation	Notes	Refs
Hal Abelson	Computer Science	B 1969		
Gerald M. Ackerman	Art History	PhD 1964	Professor of art history emeritus at Pomona College, 1971–1989	
Danielle Allen	Political Theory and Public Policy	B 1993	James Bryant Conant University Professor at Harvard University	
Mike Archer	Biology	B 1967	Director of the Australian Museum, 1999–2003	
Yaakov Bar-Shalom	Electrical Engineering	PhD 1970	Marianne E. Klewin Professor in University of Connecticut	
John Bardeen	Physics	PhD 1936	Nobel Prize in physics, 1956 and 1972	
Gary Becker	Economics	B 1951	Nobel Prize in economics, 1992	
Walden Bello	Sociology	MA 1972, PhD 1975	Member of the House of Representatives of the Philippines, 2007–2015; Right Livelihood Award 2003	
Gregory Berns	Psychology	B 1986		
Manjul Bhargava	Mathematics	PhD 2001	Fields Medal 2014	
James H. Billington	History	B 1950, F 1964–75	Librarian of Congress, 1987–	
Alan Blinder	Economics	B 1967; F 1971–	Vice chairman of the Federal Reserve Board, 1994–96	
James A. C. Bond		B 1866	Justice of the Maryland Court of Appeals, 1899	
George Boolos	Philosophy	B 1961		
Alan Brinkley	History	B 1971	Provost of Columbia University, 2003–09	
Michael E. Brown	Astronomy	B 1987	Named to the Time 100, 2006	
Eugenio Calabi	Mathematics	PhD 1950		
David Card	Economics	PhD 1983, F 1983–97	John Bates Clark Medal, 1995	
Douglas Century	Humanities	AB, 1986	Canadian-American journalist and author	
Alonzo Church	Mathematics	B 1924, PhD 1927, F 1929–67	Proved the undecidability of the Entscheidungsproblem	
Tom S. Clark	Political Science	MA 2005, PhD 2008	Charles Howard Candler Professor of Political Science at Emory University	
Samuel Cochran	Medicine	B 1893, PhD 1927	Dean of Shantung Medical College, 1922–26; president of Shantung University, 1923–24; president of the Medical Association of China	
George R. Collins	Art History	B 1939, MFA 1942	Professor of Art History at Columbia University, 1946–1986	
Arthur Compton	Physics	B 1914, PhD 1916	Nobel Prize in physics, 1927	
Karl Compton	Physics	PhD 1912, F 1915–30	President of MIT, 1930–48	
Wilson Compton	Economics	PhD 1915	President of Washington State University, 1945–51	
Ira Condict		B 1784	Third president of Queen's College (Rutgers University) and Queen's College Grammar School (Rutgers Preparatory School), 1795–1810; Presbyterian and Dutch Reformed clergyman	
James Creese		B 1918, AM	President of Drexel University, 1945–63	
R. F. Patrick Cronin	Medicine	B Class of 1947, conferred in 2000	Dean of the McGill University faculty of medicine	
Dennis Crouch	Law	B 1997	Publisher of Patently-O	
Loring Danforth	Anthropology	PhD 1977		
Clinton Davisson	Physics	PhD 1911	Nobel Prize in physics, 1937	
Frederick B. Deknatel	Art History	B 1928	William Door Boardman Professor of Fine Arts at Harvard University	
David A. Dodge	Economics	PhD 1972	Chancellor of Queen's University at Kingston, 2008–; governor of the Bank of Canada, 2001–08	
Acheson Duncan	Statistics	B 1923, AM 1927, PhD 1936, F 1936–42		
Michael Eric Dyson	Religion	PhD 1993	Professor in the College of Arts and Science and in the Divinity School at Vanderbilt University	
Robert H. Edwards		B 1957	President of Carleton College, 1977–86; president of Bowdoin College, 1990–2001	
Selden Edwards	Literature	B 1963	Headmaster of Elgin Academy, the Crane Country Day School, and Sacramento Country Day	
Christopher L. Eisgruber	Physics	B 1983	President of Princeton University since 2013; Rhodes Scholar; JD cum laude from University of Chicago Law School	
Robert D. English	Politics	MPA 1982; PhD 1995		
William Everdell	History	B 1964		
Hugh Everett III	Physics	PhD 1957		
Livingston Farrand	Medicine	B 1888	President of Cornell University, 1921–37	
Max Farrand	History	B 1892		
Charles Fefferman	Mathematics	PhD 1969, F 1973–	Fields Medal, 1978	
Richard Felder	Chemical Engineering	PhD 1966		
Richard Feynman	Physics	PhD 1942	Nobel Prize in physics, 1965	
Norman Finkelstein	History	PhD 1988		
Evan Flatow	Medicine	B 1977		
John V. Fleming	English	PhD 1963, F 1965–2006		
Henri Ford	Medicine	B 1980; Trustee		
Hal Foster	Art History	B 1977; F 1997–		
Michael Freedman	Mathematics	PhD 1973	Fields Medal, 1986	
Robert Goheen	Classics	B 1940, AM 1947, PhD 1948, F 1948–72, Pres 1957–72		
E. Mark Gold	Physics	AM 1958		
Phillip Griffiths	Mathematics	PhD 1962, F 1967–72	Wolf Prize in Mathematics, 2008	
Noel F. Hall	Economics	AM 1926		
Alfredo Toro Hardy	Woodrow Wilson School	VS 1986–87	Venezuelan scholar, author, and career diplomat; ambassador to the U.S., U.K., Spain, Ireland, Brazil, Chile, and Singapore	
Robin Hartshorne	Mathematics	PhD 1963		
James Heckman	Economics	AM 1968; PhD 1971	Nobel Prize in economics, 2000	
Sam Higginbottom	Religion	B 1903		
Robert Hofstadter	Physics	PhD 1938, F 1945–60	Nobel Prize in physics, 1961	
D. Kern Holoman	Music	PhD 1974	Distinguished Professor of music at the University of California, Davis	
Carl Hovde	English	PhD 1955	Dean of Columbia College of Columbia University, 1968–72	
Sylvia Hurtado	Education	AB 1980	Distinguished Professor of Education at the UCLA	
William Mann Irvine	Political science	B 1888, PhD 1891	Founding headmaster of Mercersburg Academy, 1893–1928	
Nathan Jacobson	Mathematics	PhD 1934		
Elena Kagan	Law	B 1981	Dean of Harvard Law School, 2003–09; associate justice of the Supreme Court of the United States, 2010–	
Bob Kahn	Computer Science	PhD 1964	Turing Award, 2004; Presidential Medal of Freedom, 2005	
Melissa S. Kearney	Economics	B 1996		
David Kelley	Philosophy	PhD 1975	Former philosophy professor; founder of The Atlas Society	
John G. Kemeny	Computer Science	B 1947, PhD 1949	Co-developer of BASIC; president of Dartmouth College, 1970–81	
Brian Kernighan	Computer Science	PhD 1969, F 2000–	Co-author of the first book on the C programming language with Dennis Ritchie	
Alan Kreider	Divinity	GS 1962–63		
Stephen Kurtz	History	B 1948	Principal of Phillips Exeter Academy, 1974–87	
Eric Lander	Biology	B 1978	Founding director of the Broad Institute	
Serge Lang	Mathematics	PhD 1951		
Paul Lansky	Music	PhD 1973, F 1969–		
William J. Lennox	English	AM, PhD	Superintendent of the United States Military Academy	
Neil Levine	Art History	B 1963	Emmet Blakeney Gleason Professor of the History of Art and Architecture at Harvard University	
Alan Lightman	Physics	B 1970		
George Lusztig	Mathematics	PhD 1971		
Juan Maldacena	Physics	PhD 1996		
Burton Malkiel	Economics	PhD 1964; F 1964–81, 1988–	Dean of Yale School of Management, 1981–87; author of A Random Walk Down Wall Street	
N. Gregory Mankiw	Economics	B 1980	Chair of the U.S. president's Council of Economic Advisers, 2003–05	
James Manning	Divinity	B 1762	Founder and first president of Brown University, 1764–91	
Thomas Maren	Medicine	B 1918, AM		
Juan Marichal	History	PhD 1949		
Donald Markwell	Woodrow Wilson School	VS 1984–85	Former warden of Rhodes House, University of Oxford	
Lorna Marsden	Sociology	PhD 1972	President of York University, 1997–2007	
Bahram Mashhoon	Physics	PhD 1972		
Barry Mazur	Mathematics	PhD 1959		
James McCarthy	Sociology	PhD 1977	President of Suffolk University 2012–present	
John McCarthy	Computer Science	PhD 1951	Turing Prize, 1971	
Edwin McMillan	Chemistry	PhD 1933	Nobel Prize in Chemistry, 1951	
John Milnor	Mathematics	B 1951; PhD 1954	Fields Medal, 1962; Wolf Prize in Mathematics, 1989; Abel Prize, 2011	
Marvin Minsky	Mathematics	PhD 1954	Co-founder of MIT's AI lab	
Ralph Nader	Public Policy	B 1955	Consumer advocate and author of Unsafe at Any Speed	
Steven Naifeh	Art	B 1974	Pulitzer Prize for Biography or Autobiography, 1991	
Emi Nakamura	Economics	B 2001	John Bates Clark Medal, 2019	
John Forbes Nash	Mathematics	PhD 1950, F	Nobel Prize in Economics, 1994	
Clifford Nass	Sociology	B 1981, AM 1985, PhD 1986		
Alexander Nehamas	Philosophy	PhD 1971, F 1990–		
Joseph Nye	Politics	B 1958	Dean of the John F. Kennedy School of Government at Harvard University, 1995–2004	
Steven Orszag	Mathematics	PhD 1966, F 1984–98		
Wolfgang Panofsky	Physics	B 1938	Director of SLAC, 1961–84; National Medal of Science, 1969	
Christos Papadimitriou	Computer Science	PhD 1976		
Richard Pildes	Law	B 1979		
Paul Pressler	Pre-Law	B	Texas judge and leader of the Southern Baptist Convention Conservative resurgence	
John Rawls	Philosophy	B 1943; PhD 1950		
W. Taylor Reveley	Law	B 1965	President of the College of William & Mary, 2008–	
Richard Revesz	Law	B 1979	Dean of New York University School of Law, 2002–	
David Romer	Economics	B 1980		
Avital Ronell	Comparative Literature	PhD 1979		
Theodore Roszak	History	PhD 1958		
Gian-Carlo Rota	Mathematics	B 1953		
Neil Rudenstine	English	B 1956, F 1968–87, provost 1977–87, T 2002–06	President of Harvard University, 1991–2001	
George Rupp	Divinity	B 1964	President of Columbia University, 1998–2002	
Edward Saïd	English	B 1957		
Chris William Sanchirico	Law	B 1984		
David Sanford	Music	PhD 1998	Professor of Music Theory and Composition at Mount Holyoke College	
Michael H. Schill	Law	B 1980	President of the University of Oregon, dean of UCLA Law School and University of Chicago Law School	
Harold T. Shapiro	Economics	PhD 1964, F 1988–, Pres 1988–2001		
Allen Shenstone	Physics	B 1914, AM 1920, PhD 1922, F 1925–62		
Anne-Marie Slaughter	Woodrow Wilson School	B 1980	Former dean of Woodrow Wilson School of Public and International Affairs, Princeton University; JD from Harvard Law School; MPhil and DPhil from University of Oxford	
Richard Smalley	Chemistry	PhD 1973	Nobel Prize in Chemistry, 1996	
Raymond Smullyan	Mathematics	PhD 1959		
Charles Henry Smyth	Geosciences	F 1905–34		
Charles Phelps Smyth	Chemistry	B 1916, AM 1917, F 1920–63	Medal of Freedom, 1947	
Henry DeWolf Smyth	Physics	B 1918, PhD 1921, F 1924–66	Author of the Smyth Report	
Sonia Sotomayor	History	B 1976	Associate justice, United States Supreme Court 2009–	
Michael Spence	Economics	B 1966	John Bates Clark Medal, 1981; Nobel Prize in Economics, 2001	
Lyman Spitzer	Physics	PhD 1938, F 1947–1997	Founding director of US magnetic confinement nuclear fusion program Project Matterhorn, inventor of the stellarator device, early proponent of what became the Hubble Space Telescope	
Isaac Starr	Medicine	B 1916	Developed first practical ballistocardiograph; 1957 Albert Lasker Award; 1967 Kober Medal of the Association of American Physicians; 1977 Burger Medal of the Free University of Amsterdam; dean of the Perelman School of Medicine at the University of Pennsylvania, 1945–1948	
Richard E. Stearns	Computer Science	PhD 1961		
Norman Steenrod	Mathematics	PhD 1936, F 1947–71		
Devin J. Stewart	Near Eastern Studies	B 1984	Professor at Emory University	
Michael Stonebraker	Computer Science	B 1965		
Jeffrey Stout	Religion	PhD 1976, F 1976–		
Millicent Sullivan	Biomedical Engineering	B 1998	Professor of Biomedical Engineering at University of Delaware	
Phillip Swagel	Economics	B 1987	U.S. assistant secretary of the Treasury for Economic Policy, 2006–09	
Ilhi Synn	German	PhD 1966	President of Keimyung University, 1988–2004	
Morris Tanenbaum	Physical chemistry	PhD 1952	Developed the world's first silicon transistor, January 26, 1954 at Bell Labs.	
Terence Tao	Mathematics	PhD 1996	MacArthur Fellowship, 2006; Fields Medal, 2006	
John Tate	Mathematics	PhD 1950	Wolf Prize in Mathematics, 2002–03; Abel Prize, 2010	
Richard Taylor	Mathematics	PhD 1988		
Kip Thorne	Physics	PhD 1965	Nobel Prize in Physics, 2017	
Stephen Thorsett	Physics	AM 1989, PhD 1991, F 1994–99	President of Willamette University, 2011–	
Rick Trainor	History	GS	Principal of King's College London, 2004–	
John Tukey	Statistics	AM 1938, PhD 1939, F 1945–2000	National Medal of Science, 1973. IEEE Medal of Honor, 1982	
Alan Turing	Computer Science	PhD 1938	Produced the foundation of research in artificial intelligence; made advances in the field of cryptanalysis	
Cumrun Vafa	Physics	PhD 1985		
Leslie Langdon Vivian Jr.		B 1942	Lifelong employee at Princeton University; retired in 1986 after a 37-year administrative career which ended with 16 years as the director of community and regional affairs	
Steven Weinberg	Physics	PhD 1957	Nobel Prize in Physics, 1979; National Medal of Science, 1991	
Cornel West	African American Studies	PhD 1980, F 2002–		
J. H. C. Whitehead	Mathematics	PhD 1932		
Ross Whitaker	Computer Science	B 1986	Director of the University of Utah School of Computing	
Red Whittaker	Electrical Engineering	B 1973		
Avi Wigderson	Computer Science	MSE 1981, AM 1982, PhD 1983		
Arthur Wightman	Physics	PhD 1949, F 1949–		
Frank Wilczek	Physics	PhD 1974, F 1974–81	Nobel Prize in Physics, 2004	
John Tuzo Wilson	Geology	PhD 1936		
Donald Winch	Economics	PhD 1960		
David Wippman	Law	B 1976	President of Hamilton College 2016–present	
Edward Witten	Physics	AM 1974, PhD 1976, F 1980–87	MacArthur Fellowship, 1982; Fields Medal, 1990; National Medal of Science, 2003	
Richard Wolfenden	Chemistry	B 1956		
Susan Woodward	Politics	AM 1968; PhD 1975		
Ben Zinn	Aerospace Engineering	B 1963, PhD 1965		
Steven Zucker	Mathematics	PhD 1974		
Gregg Zuckerman	Mathematics	PhD 1975		

- Nicholas Allard (born 1952), dean and president of Brooklyn Law School
- E. Spencer Miller (1836), dean of the University of Pennsylvania Law School
- Mark Steiner (1942–2020), professor of philosophy of mathematics and physics at the Hebrew University of Jerusalem

=== Faculty and staff ===
Albert Einstein was one of many scholars at the independent Institute for Advanced Study not formally associated with the university but nevertheless closely linked to it.

==== Architecture ====
- Stan Allen – former dean of the Princeton University School of Architecture; author of Points and Lines
- Elizabeth Diller – architect, professor of architecture, winner of MacArthur Foundation Fellowship 1999–2004
- Michael Graves – professor emeritus
- Vincent Lee – architect, writer, mountaineer, and member of the Institute of Andean Studies
- Paul Lewis – professor; associate dean; principal of LTL Architects
- Sergey Padyukov – architect, engineer and human rights activist
- Monica Ponce de Leon – dean of the School of Architecture; winner of National Design Award
- Kazuyo Sejima – principal of Tokyo-based architecture firm SANAA
- Sarah Whiting – assistant professor and M.Arch thesis director; editor of Assemblage and Log; principal of WW Architecture

==== Economics and business ====
- Orley Ashenfelter – professor of economics, winner of the Frisch Medal (1982)
- Ben Bernanke – professor of economics and public affairs; Chairman of the Federal Reserve Board
- William G. Bowen – professor emeritus of economics; president of Princeton University, 1972–1988; president of the Andrew W. Mellon Foundation, 1988–2006
- Angus Deaton – professor of economics; president of the American Economic Association; Nobel Prize in economics (2015)
- Avinash Dixit – professor of economics; co-author of Games of Strategy; former president of the Econometric Society; 2008 president of the American Economic Association
- Gene Grossman – professor of economics
- Daniel Kahneman – professor of economics and psychology, Nobel Prize in economics (2002)
- Aly Kassam-Remtulla – anthropologist, vice provost
- Nobuhiro Kiyotaki – professor of economics; winner of the 1997 Nakahara Prize of the Japan Economics Association and the 1999 Yrjö Jahnsson Award of the European Economic Association
- Alan Krueger – professor of economics
- Paul Krugman – professor of economics, New York Times columnist, winner of the John Bates Clark Medal, Nobel Prize in economics (2008)
- Arthur Lewis – former professor; Nobel laureate (Economics 1979)
- Burton Malkiel Ph.D. 1964 – professor of economics; former dean of the Yale School of Management; author of A Random Walk Down Wall Street
- Eric Maskin – professor of economics; Nobel Prize in economics (2007)
- Albert Rees – former provost, professor of economics and advisor to President Gerald Ford
- Harvey S. Rosen – professor of economics, former chairman of Council of Economic Advisers
- Harold Tafler Shapiro – professor emeritus of economics, former president of Princeton University and of the University of Michigan
- Christopher Sims – professor of economics; Nobel Prize in economics (2011)
- Lars E. O. Svensson – professor of economics; deputy governor of the central bank of Sweden; one of the ten best economists in the world according to IDEAS/RePEc

==== Government, law, and public policy ====
- Bruce Alger – former U.S. representative for Texas's 5th congressional district, based in Dallas
- Samuel Alito – associate justice, U.S. Supreme Court
- Charles Beitz – professor of politics
- Jeremy Ben-Ami – executive director of J Street and JStreetPac
- Cyril Edwin Black – professor of history and international affairs 1939–1986, director of the Center of International Studies 1968–1985
- Willie Blount – governor of Tennessee 1809–1815
- Barbara Bodine – diplomat in residence
- Ken Buck – representative, Eastern Colorado, U.S. House of Representatives
- Thomas J. Christensen – William P. Boswell Professor of World Politics of Peace
- John E. Colhoun – U.S. senator and lawyer from South Carolina
- Ted Cruz – U.S. senator for Texas, 2013–present; candidate for the 2016 Republican presidential nomination
- Angus Deaton – Dwight D. Eisenhower Professor of International Affairs, and professor of economics and international affairs, Woodrow Wilson School and department of economics
- Alexandra Davis DiPentima, chief judge of the Connecticut Appellate Court
- Robert Ehrlich – governor, Maryland, 2003–2007
- Richard Falk – Albert G. Milbank Professor of International Law and Practice, emeritus
- Aaron Friedberg – professor of international relations
- Edgar S. Furniss Jr. – professor of political science
- Robert P. George – professor of jurisprudence, constitutional law scholar
- Robert Gilpin – Eisenhower Professor of Public and International Affairs, emeritus
- Bob Giuffra – partner, Sullivan & Cromwell
- Jan Gross – professor of history
- Dale Ho (born 1977) – U.S. district judge of the U.S. District Court for the Southern District of New York
- Thad Hutcheson (Class of 1937) – lawyer and Republican politician from Houston, Texas
- Robert Hutchings – diplomat-in-residence
- G. John Ikenberry – Albert G. Milbank Professor of Politics and International Affairs
- Harold James – professor of History and International Affairs
- Elena Kagan – associate justice, U.S. Supreme Court
- Thomas Kean – 48th governor of New Jersey and chairman of 9/11 Commission
- Nannerl O. Keohane – Laurance S. Rockefeller Distinguished Visiting professor of Public Affairs
- Robert Keohane – university professor of international relations
- George Kern, 1947 – lawyer, partner at Sullivan & Cromwell
- Daniel Kurtzer – diplomat-in-residence
- Nolan McCarty – Susan Dod Brown Professor of Politics and Public Affairs
- Helen Milner – B.C. Forbes Professor of Politics and International Affairs
- Hassan Ali Mire – first minister of Education of the Somali Democratic Republic
- Robert Morrow (Class of 1987) – former Republican county chairman in Travis County, Texas
- Philip Pettit – professor of politics and philosophy
- Jay Powell – 16th chair of the Federal Reserve
- Uwe Reinhardt – James Madison professor of political economy
- Paul Sarbanes – former US senator from Maryland
- Stephen Schulhofer (born 1942) – professor of law at the University of Pennsylvania Law School and NYU Law School
- Reed Shuldiner – Alvin L. Snowiss Professor of Law at the University of Pennsylvania Law School
- Anne-Marie Slaughter – dean of the Woodrow Wilson School of Public and International Affairs
- Sonia Sotomayor – associate justice, U.S. Supreme Court
- John Thomas Steen Jr. – lawyer in San Antonio and currently the 108th secretary of state of Texas
- Isaac Tichenor, 1775 – governor of Vermont, U.S. senator
- Robert C. Tucker – IBM Professor of International Studies, emeritus
- John Waterbury – William Stewart Tod Professor of Politics and International Affairs, emeritus
- Joel Westheimer – professor of citizenship education at the University of Ottawa
- Thomas Woodrow Wilson, A.B. 1879 – author of Congressional Government 1885; president of Princeton University, 1902–10; governor of New Jersey, 1911–13; 28th president of the US, 1913–21; recipient of the Nobel Peace Prize, 1919, for promoting the establishment of the League of Nations
- Sheldon Wolin – professor of politics

==== Art, literature, and humanities ====
- Kwame Anthony Appiah – professor of philosophy
- Edward J. Balleisen (BA 1987) – professor of history at Duke University
- Peter Brown – professor of history
- Anthony Burgess – visiting professor, 1970–71; novelist and critic; author of The Long Day Wanes, A Clockwork Orange and Earthly Powers
- Américo Castro – professor of Hispanic literature
- Lisa R. Cohen – Ferris professor of journalism; Emmy Award-winning TV news magazine producer, author
- Robert Darnton – emeritus professor of history
- Donald Davidson – professor of philosophy
- Jeff Dolven – professor of English at Princeton
- Selden Edwards – best-selling novelist, headmaster, teacher
- Jeffrey Eugenides – novelist, professor of creative writing and Pulitzer Prize Winner
- Robert Fagles – emeritus professor of English and comparative literature
- Denis Feeney – professor of classics, Giger Professor of Latin
- John V. Fleming – emeritus professor of English and comparative literature
- Hal Foster – art critic professor in the department of art and archeology
- Arthur Frothingham – professor of Art and Archaeology
- Emmet Gowin – professor of photography
- Anthony Grafton – professor of history
- Gilbert Harman – professor of philosophy, winner of the Jean Nicod Prize
- Winnie Holzman – dramatist, screenwriter, and poet
- William Howarth – professor of English and environmental studies
- Frank Cameron Jackson – professor of philosophy
- Walter Kaufmann – professor of philosophy
- Yusef Komunyakaa – poet, professor in the Creative Writing Program (Pulitzer Prize for Poetry)
- Saul Kripke – professor emeritus of Philosophy at Princeton University; winner of the 2001 Schock Prize in Logic and Philosophy
- Mirjam Kuenkler – assistant professor of Near Eastern Studies
- Victor Lange – professor of modern languages
- Paul Lansky – composer, professor of music
- Chang-Rae Lee – professor of writing, New York Times bestselling author
- David K. Lewis – professor of philosophy
- Perry Link – professor of East Asian Studies
- Toni Morrison – professor in the Creative Writing Program, Nobel laureate (Literature 1993)
- Paul Muldoon – professor of poetry, Pulitzer Prize winner
- Haruki Murakami – visiting professor, literature, creative writing
- Paul Needham – senior librarian at the Scheide Library
- Alexander Nehamas – professor of philosophy
- Philip Nord – professor of history
- Joyce Carol Oates – Roger S. Berlind Distinguished Professor of the Humanities; professor in the Creative Writing Program; author; Pulitzer Prize nominee
- Elaine Pagels – professor of religion
- Francis Landey Patton – professor of theology; president of the university, 1888–1902
- Ricardo Piglia – professor of Latin-American literature
- Thomas J. Preston Jr. – professor of archeology
- Albert J. Raboteau – Henry W. Putnam Professor of Religion, Princeton University, former dean of the graduate school
- Noliwe Rooks – associate director of the African-American program at Princeton University, author
- Richard Rorty – professor of philosophy
- Carl Emil Schorske – emeritus professor of history, winner of the 1981 Pulitzer Prize for General Nonfiction for his book Fin-de-Siècle Vienna: Politics and Culture (1980)
- Ruth Simmons – vice provost, 1992–95 – first female and first black president of any Ivy League school (Brown)
- Peter Singer – professor of human values, expert on practical ethics
- P. Adams Sitney – film historian, professor of visual arts
- Michael A. Smith – professor of philosophy
- Nigel Smith – professor of English
- Walter Terence Stace – professor of philosophy
- Donald Steven – Canadian composer, winner of the JUNO Award for Best Classical Composition and the Jules-Léger Prize
- Gregory Vlastos – professor of philosophy
- Andrew Fleming West – Giger Professor of Latin, 1883–1928; dean of the graduate school, 1900–1928
- Cornel West – professor of religion and Africa American studies
- C. K. Williams – professor of poetry, Pulitzer Prize winner
- Michael Wood – professor in the English department

==== Math and science ====
- Forman S. Acton – professor of computer science
- Philip Warren Anderson – Joseph Henry Professor of Physics and recipient of the Nobel Prize in Physics
- Manjul Bhargava – Brandon Fradd, Class of 1983, professor of mathematics, 2014 Fields Medalist
- Shane Campbell-Staton – professor of biology, principal investigator, Campbell-Staton Group
- John H. Conway – professor of mathematics, best known for the Game of Life
- Ingrid Daubechies – professor of mathematics; namesake of Daubechies wavelet
- Henry Eyring – professor of chemistry, known for the Eyring equation; recipient of the National Medal of Science in 1966
- Charles Fefferman – professor of mathematics, Fields Medalist
- Val Fitch – professor emeritus of physics, Nobel laureate
- J. Richard Gott – professor of astrophysics, winner of the President's Award for Distinguished Teaching
- James E. Gunn – Eugene Higgins Professor of Astronomy, leader of the Sloan Digital Sky Survey and predicted the eponymous Gunn–Peterson trough
- Joseph Henry – professor of natural philosophy
- Thomas H. Jordan – former professor of earth sciences; current director of the Southern California Earthquake Center
- Mustapha Ishak Boushaki – professor of physics
- Karl Jöreskog – professor of statistics
- Daniel Kahneman – Eugene Higgins Professor of Psychology, winner of the 2002 Nobel Prize in Economics
- Nicholas Katz – professor of mathematics
- Brian Kernighan – co-author of AWK and AMPL, author of The C Programming Language
- Elon Lindenstrauss – professor of mathematics, Fields Medalist
- Juan Martin Maldacena – professor emeritus of physics, 2012 Fundamental Physics Prize
- Fernando Codá Marques – professor of mathematics
- George A. Miller – professor emeritus of psychology, seminal contributions in cognitive psychology and cognitive science
- Gananath Obeyesekere – professor of anthropology
- Andrei Okounkov – professor of mathematics, Fields Medalist
- Gerard K. O'Neill – professor of physics, leader in field of space colonization, author of The High Frontier: Human Colonies in Space
- Jeremiah Ostriker – professor of astrophysics and recipient of the National Medal of Science
- Philip James Edwin Peebles – professor emeritus of physics, one of the first to predict the nature of the cosmic microwave background radiation
- Celeste Rohlfing – deputy assistant director at the National Science Foundation and chief operating officer at the American Association for the Advancement of Science
- Peter Sarnak – professor of mathematics
- Nathan Seiberg – professor emeritus of physics, 2012 Fundamental Physics Prize
- Paul Seymour – professor of mathematics
- Yigong Shi – professor of molecular biology, leader in the field of apoptosis
- Osamu Shimomura – researcher honored with the 2008 Nobel Prize in Chemistry for his work on GFP
- Goro Shimura – professor emeritus of mathematics, fundamental contributions to number theory and automorphic forms, especially in Langlands program
- Yakov G. Sinai – professor of mathematics
- David Spergel – professor of astrophysics, leading astrophysicist
- Elias M. Stein – professor of mathematics, recipient of the Steele Prize (1984 and 2002), the Schock Prize in Mathematics (1993), the Wolf Prize in Mathematics (1999), the National Medal of Science (2002), and Stefan Bergman Prize (2005)
- Paul Steinhardt – Albert Einstein professor of physics; recipient of the Dirac Medal (2002)
- Robert Tarjan – professor of computer science, inventor of many algorithms related to graph theory, winner of the 1986 Turing Award, recipient of the 1982 Nevanlinna Prize
- Joseph Hooton Taylor – professor of physics, 1993 Nobel Prize in Physics
- Daniel C. Tsui – professor of applied physics and electrical engineering, 1998 Nobel Prize in Physics
- John Archibald Wheeler – professor emeritus of physics, later collaborator of Albert Einstein, advisor to Richard Feynman and Kip Thorne
- Eric Wieschaus – professor of molecular biology, Nobel Prize in Physiology or Medicine
- Andrew Wiles – professor of mathematics, proved Fermat's Last Theorem, winner of the Schock Prize (1995), Royal Medal (1996), Cole Prize (1996), Wolf Prize (1996), King Faisal Prize (1998) and Shaw Prize (2005)
- Edward Witten – professor emeritus of physics, Fields Medalist, 2012 Fundamental Physics Prize
- Andrew Yao – computer scientist, winner of the 2000 Turing award

==== Engineering ====
- Amir Ali Ahmadi – professor of operations research and financial engineering
- Robert Calderbank – professor of electrical engineering, mathematics, and applied mathematics
- Matias D. Cattaneo – professor of operations research and financial engineering
- Erhan Çınlar – professor of operations research and financial engineering
- Ahmed Cemal Eringen – professor of mechanical and aerospace engineering, leading expert in elasticity theory, continuum mechanics, and plasticity
- Jianqing Fan – professor of operations research and financial engineering
- Jason W. Fleischer – associate professor of electrical engineering
- Claire F. Gmachl – professor of electrical engineering
- Roy Jackson – professor of chemical engineering
- Brian Kernighan – professor of computer science and co-author of The C Programming Language
- William A. Massey – professor of operations research and financial engineering
- Robert Sedgewick – professor of computer science
- Alexander Smits – professor of mechanical and aerospace engineering, leading expert on turbulence and fluid dynamics
- Howard Stone – professor of mechanical and aerospace engineering and chemical engineering, leading expert in fluid dynamics
- Robert J. Vanderbei – professor of operations research and financial engineering, mathematics, astrophysics, computer science

== Business ==
- Gerhard Andlinger, A.B. 1952 – founder of Andlinger & Company
- James T. Aubrey, A.B. 1941 – president of CBS and MGM
- Norman Augustine, B.S.E. 1957– former CEO of Lockheed Martin
- Ben Baldanza, M.P.A./U.R.P. 1986 – former CEO of Spirit Airlines
- Alexander Bannwart, L.L.B 1906
- Jeff Bezos, B.S.E. 1986 – founder of Amazon.com
- Frank Biondi, A.B. 1966 – former chairman of Viacom
- John C. Bogle, A.B. 1951 – former founder and CEO of the Vanguard Group, which pioneered the index fund
- Charles W. Coker, A.B. 1955 – former CEO and chairman of Sonoco Products
- Archibald Crossley, B. 1950 – pollster and pioneer in the field of public opinion research
- Franklin D'Olier, A.B. 1898 – former president and chairman of Prudential Insurance Company; first National Commander of the American Legion (1919–20)
- Steve Feinberg, A.B. 1982 – billionaire financier and a top economic adviser to President Donald Trump
- George M. Ferris Jr. – investment banker and philanthropist
- Joseph Fichera, B. 1976 – founder and CEO of Saber Partners; auction rate securities expert
- Harvey S. Firestone Jr., class of 1920 – former CEO of Firestone Tire and Rubber Company
- Malcolm Forbes, A.B. 1941 – businessman and publisher
- Steve Forbes, A.B. 1970 – son of Malcolm Forbes; businessman and publisher of Forbes magazine
- William Clay Ford Jr., 1979 – executive chairman of the board of directors, Ford Motor Company
- Thomas F. Frist, III, 1991 – investor
- William Fung, B.S.E. 1970 – managing director of Li & Fung (Trading) Ltd.
- Phil Goldman, B.S.E. 1986 – founder of WebTV
- Bob Hugin, A.B. 1976 – former chairman of Celgene, and Republican nominee for New Jersey 2018 senate race
- Nathan Hubbard, B.A. – business and music executive, former CEO of Ticketmaster
- Jaquelin H. Hume, B. 1928 – founder of Basic American Foods, conservative philanthropist
- Lee Iacocca, M.S. 1946 – automobile executive and former chairman and chief executive officer, Chrysler
- Carl Icahn, A.B. 1957 – corporate raider
- Alexis McGill Johnson, B.S. 1993 – president and CEO of Planned Parenthood
- Andrea Jung, A.B. 1979 – CEO of Avon Products
- John Katzman, A.B. Architecture 1981 – founder of The Princeton Review
- F. Thomson Leighton, B.S.E. 1978 – co-founder of Akamai Technologies
- Arthur D. Levinson, Ph.D. 1977 – chairman of Apple Inc. (2011–present); chairman of Genentech (1999–2014), CEO of Calico
- Peter B. Lewis, A.B. 1955 – chairman of Progressive
- Joseph Wharton Lippincott Jr. – head of Philadelphia publisher J. B. Lippincott & Co.
- Donold Lourie, A.B. 1922 – president and CEO of Quaker Oats Company
- Aaron Marcus, B.A. 1965 – founded Aaron Marcus and Associates, Inc. in 1982
- Ginna Marston, B.A. 1980 – public service advertising
- James S. McDonnell, M.S. 1921 – founded McDonnell Aircraft Corporation in 1939
- Nick Morgan, A.B. English literature 1976 – speaking coach and author
- Robert S. Murley, B.A. 1972 – chairman of the Investment Banking of Credit Suisse Securities and of the Educational Testing Service
- Ellen Pao – CEO of Reddit
- Sandi Peterson, M.P.A. – worldwide chairman, Johnson & Johnson
- Louis Rukeyser, A.B. 1954 – former host of Wall $treet Week and business commentator
- Stockton Rush, BS 1984 – CEO of OceanGate
- Eric Schmidt, B.S.E. 1976 – former CEO of Google; 136th wealthiest person in the world in 2011
- David Siegel, B.S.E. 1983 – co-founder and co-chairman of Two Sigma
- Jeffery A. Smisek, A.B. Economics 1976 – CEO of United Continental Holdings
- Tad Smith – CEO, Sotheby's
- Jon Steinberg, B.A. 1999 – president and COO of BuzzFeed
- Rawleigh Warner Jr., A.B. 1944 – former president, CEO and chairman of Mobil
- John Weinberg, A.B. 1948 – head of Goldman Sachs 1976–1990
- Meg Whitman, A.B. 1977 – CEO of eBay and Hewlett-Packard
- Sir Gordon Wu, B.S.E. Civil Engineering 1958 – founder and chairman of Hopewell Holdings Ltd

== Science and technology ==
Here are listed alumni who made notable contributions to science and technology outside academia.

=== Astronauts ===
- James C. Adamson, M.S.E. 1977
- Daniel T. Barry, M.A. 1977, M.S.E. 1977, Ph.D. 1980
- Brian Binnie, M.S.E. 1978
- Gerald Carr, M.S.E. 1962
- Pete Conrad Jr., B.S.E. 1953, M.A. 1966 – only Princeton graduate to walk on the Moon
- Gregory T. Linteris, B.S.E. 1979, Ph.D. 1990
- Makoto Suwa, Ph.D. 2007

=== Biology ===
- Emily Blumberg, A.B. 1977 – infectious disease physician
- Gerhard Fankhauser (1901–1981) embryologist, professor 1931–1969
- Donna M. Fernandes M.Sc. 1984, Ph.D. 1988 – president and CEO of Buffalo Zoo 2000–2017

=== Engineering and other natural sciences ===
- Hal Abelson, A.B. 1969 – directed implementation of the Logo programming language for the Apple II; professor of electrical engineering and computer science at MIT
- Yitzhak Apeloig (born 1944) – Israeli computational chemistry professor and president of the Technion
- Daniel Barringer, A.B. 1879 – geologist
- David R. Boggs, B.S.E. 1972 – co-inventor (with Robert Metcalfe) of Ethernet
- Henry Crew, A.B. 1882 – physicist; president of the American Physical Society in 1909
- Stephen A. Fulling, M.S. in 1969 and Ph.D. in 1972 – theoretical physicist known for preliminary work that led to the discovery of the Unruh effect (also known as the Fulling-Davies-Unruh effect)
- Thomas C. Hanks, 1966 – seismologist, introduced Moment magnitude scale to measure earthquakes
- William Heidbrink, Ph.D. 1984 – plasma physicist
- John D. Hunter, A.B. 1990 – neurobiology
- Lee Iacocca, M.S. 1946 – automobile executive and former chairman and chief executive officer, Chrysler
- Ernest Lester Jones, A.B. 1898 – head of the United States Coast and Geodetic Survey from 1914 until his death in 1929
- Susan Landau, A.B. 1976 – mathematician and cybersecurity policy expert
- Yueh-Lin Loo, Ph.D. 2001 – chemical engineer
- Andreas Mandelis, Ph.D. 1980 – expert on photonics
- William C. Martin, Ph.D. 1956 – atomic spectroscopist
- Wilder Penfield, 1913 – Canadian neurosurgeon
- Sridhar Vembu, Ph.D. 1994 – founder and CEO of Zoho Corporation
- John Warner, Ph.D. 1988 – chemist, one of the founders of the field of green chemistry

== Literature ==
Name	Affiliation	Notes	Refs
Lorraine Adams	A.B. 1981	Pulitzer Prize-winning journalist, author of Harbor and The Room and the Chair	
Hyatt Bass	A.B.	Author of The Embers (2009)	
John Peale Bishop	A.B.1917	Poet	
Frederick Buechner	A.B. 1947	Pulitzer Prize-nominated author	
Susan Cain	1989	New York Times bestselling author of Quiet: The Power of Introverts... and Bittersweet	
Ian Caldwell	A.B. 1998	Co-authored the book The Rule of Four, set on the Princeton campus	
José Donoso	A.B. 1951	Chilean author	
Selden Edwards	A.B. 1963	Author of The Little Book and The Lost Prince	
Timothy Ferriss	A.B 2000	Author of The 4-Hour Workweek and holder of the world record in tango	
Stona Fitch	A.B. 1983	Author of Senseless, on which the movie Senseless is based, and Give and Take; founder of Concord Free Press	
F. Scott Fitzgerald	Class of 1917 (did not graduate)	Author of The Great Gatsby and This Side of Paradise	
Jonathan Safran Foer	A.B. 1999	Author of Everything Is Illuminated	
Shelley Frisch	PhD 1981	Literary translator from German to English	
Rivka Galchen	A.B. 1998	Author of Atmospheric Disturbances	
Richard Halliburton	A.B. 1922	Author, adventurer, and lecturer	
Mohsin Hamid	A.B. 1993	Author of The Reluctant Fundamentalist	
Laura Hankin	2010	Author of A Special Place for Women	
Peter Hessler	A.B. 1992	Author of River Town and Oracle Bones	
Ailish Hopper	A.B. 1993	Poet and teacher	
Walter Kirn	A.B. (English) 1983	Author of Up in the Air and other novels, literary critic, essayist	
Fred G. Leebron	A.B. 1983	Short story writer, novelist, professor of English	
A. Walton Litz	A.B 1951	Literary critic	
John Matteson	A.B. 1983	Pulitzer Prize-winning biographer	
John McPhee	A.B. 1953	Pulitzer Prize-winning writer and Ferris Professor of Journalism since 1974	
George Frederick Morgan		Poet	
John Norman	PhD 1963	Sci-fi author and philosopher	
Jodi Picoult	A.B. 1987	Bestselling novelist	
William H. Quillian	B.A. 1965, M.A., Ph.D. 1975	Author, professor of English on the Emma B. Kennedy Foundation at Mount Holyoke College	
David Remnick	A.B. 1981	Editor of The New Yorker	
Lawrence Riley		Playwright and screenwriter, author of Personal Appearance, Return Engagement and Kin Hubbard	
Eric Schlosser	A.B. 1982	Journalist, Fast Food Nation	
Charles Scribner I		Founder of Scribner's publishing house; his descendants include several Princeton alumni	
Deborah Salem Smith	A.B. Art and Archaeology, 1996	Poet and playwright	
Annabel Soutar		Canadian documentary playwright	
Jennifer Weiner	A.B. 1991	Novelist, Good in Bed, In Her Shoes Little Earthquakes, and Goodnight Nobody	
Chris Welles (1937–2010)		Business journalist and author	
Edmund Wilson	A.B. 1916	Literary critic	

== Pulitzer Prize winners ==
- Pam Belluck, A.B. 1985 – Pulitzer Prize winner for international reporting in 2015 for articles with The New York Times colleagues on Ebola in Africa; health and science reporter for The Times
- A. Scott Berg, A.B. 1971 – Pulitzer Prize winner for biography of Charles Lindbergh, winner of the National Book Award for biography of Max Perkins
- Robert Caro, A.B. 1957 – two-time Pulitzer Prize Winner for The Power Broker and Master of the Senate
- George F. Kennan, A.B. 1925 – two-time Pulitzer Prize winner for history in 1957 and biography in 1968; Cold War diplomat; architect of "containment" strategy (also listed in Government: Other)
- Galway Kinnell, A.B. 1948 – Pulitzer Prize and National Book Award-winning poet
- Arthur Krock, A.B. 1908 – two-time Pulitzer Prize winner while writing for The New York Times in the 1930s
- John Matteson, A.B. 1983 – Pulitzer Prize winner for Biography in 2008 for Eden's Outcasts: The Story of Louisa May Alcott and Her Father
- Charles McIlwain, A.B.1894 – Pulitzer Prize for history in 1924; professor at Princeton
- John McPhee, A.B. 1953 – Humanities Council professor, 1999 Pulitzer Prize recipient
- James M. McPherson – Professor of History; Pulitzer Prize winner in 1989 for Battle Cry of Freedom
- W. S. Merwin, A.B. 1948 – Pulitzer Prize-winning poet and translator
- Steven Naifeh, A.B. 1974 – Pulitzer Prize for biography or autobiography in 1991 for Jackson Pollock: An American Saga
- Eugene O'Neill, class of 1910 (did not graduate) – Nobel laureate (Literature 1936), four-time Pulitzer Prize winner
- Ralph Barton Perry, A.B. 1896 – Pulitzer Prize for biography in 1936, professor at Harvard University
- Ernest Poole, A.B. 1902 – Pulitzer Prize for fiction in 1918
- David Remnick, A.B. 1981 – Pulitzer Prize Winner for general nonfiction in 1994 for Lenin's Tomb: The Last Days of the Soviet Empire; general editor of The New Yorker magazine since 1998
- Booth Tarkington, A.B. 1893 – two-time Pulitzer Prize-winning novelist for The Magnificent Ambersons and Alice Adams
- William W. Warner, 1943 – science writer, Pulitzer Prize for general nonfiction in 1977 for Beautiful Swimmers: Watermen, Crabs, and the Chesapeake Bay
- Thornton Wilder M.A. 1925 – three-time Pulitzer Prize winner, once for fiction and twice for drama; National Book Award winner; Our Town premiered at Princeton
- George F. Will, Ph.D. 1968 – Pulitzer Prize for Commentary in 1977
- Jesse Lynch Williams, A.B. 1892 – Pulitzer Prize for drama in 1918

== Journalism ==
- Joel Achenbach, A.B. 1982 – writer for The Washington Post and author of the Post's Achenblog
- R. W. Apple Jr., A.B. 1957 – writer for The New York Times
- Hamilton Fish Armstrong, A.B. 1914 – editor of Foreign Policy
- William Attwood, A.B. 1941 – U.S. Ambassador and publisher of Newsday
- Pam Belluck, A.B. 1985 – writer for The New York Times and Pulitzer Prize winner
- Kate Betts, A.B. 1986 – editor-in-chief of Harper's Bazaar
- John Brooks, A.B. 1942 – author and staff member, The New Yorker
- Robert Caro, A.B. 1957 – Pulitzer Prize-winning nonfiction writer
- Patrick Chovanec, A.B. 1993 – commentator on the economy of China in Western media
- Lisa R. Cohen – Ferris professor of journalism, Emmy-winning television producer, author
- Burton Crane, 1922 – The New York Times foreign correspondent and financial author
- Bosley Crowther, A.B. 1928 – film critic at The New York Times
- Frank Deford, A.B. 1962 – writer for Sports Illustrated; broadcaster on U.S. radio and television
- James D. Ewing, 1938 – newspaper publisher, government reform advocate and philanthropist
- Edward Felsenthal, A.B. 1988 – executive chairman, Time
- Marc Fisher – writer for The Washington Post
- F. Scott Fitzgerald, A.B. 1917 – novelist and short story author
- Justin Fox (born 1964) – financial journalist, commentator, and writer
- Barton Gellman, A.B. 1982 – editor at The Washington Post and Pulitzer Prize winner
- Charlie Gibson, A.B. 1965 – journalist, former Good Morning America host, anchor of ABC World News Tonight
- Robert Hilferty, A.B. 1982 – writer for Bloomberg News, New York, The New York Times, Opera News, and The Village Voice
- Julia Ioffe (2005) – Russian-born American journalist
- Olivier Kamanda, B.S.E 2003 – editor, Foreign Policy Digest
- Donald Kirk, A.B. 1959 – national correspondent, Chicago Tribune
- Rick Klein, A.B. 1998 – Vice President and Washington Bureau Chief, ABC News
- Richard Kluger, A.B. 1956 – Pulitzer Prize-winning author, journalist and book publisher
- John B. Oakes, A.B. 1934 – editorial page editor, The New York Times
- Don Oberdorfer, A.B. 1952 – writer for The Washington Post, current professor at Johns Hopkins University
- Alexis Okeowo, 2006 – staff writer at The New Yorker
- Norimitsu Onishi, A.B. 1992 – reporter for The New York Times
- Ramesh Ponnuru, A.B. 1995 – editor of National Review
- Paul Raushenbush, F. 2003–2011 – editor of Huffington Post Religion
- T.R. Reid, A.B. 1966 – former correspondent, The Washington Post; bestselling nonfiction author
- Maria Ressa, A.B. 1986 – 2021 Nobel Peace Prize laureate, Rappler CEO, included in the Time's Person of the Year 2018
- James Ridgeway, A.B. 1959 – editor and writer, New Republic and The Village Voice
- Rick Stengel, A.B. 1977 – managing editor of Time
- John Stossel, A.B. 1969 – ABC News anchor/correspondent
- Annalyn Swan, A.B. 1973 – co-author of 2005 Pulitzer Prize-winning De Kooning: An American Master
- Katrina vanden Heuvel, A.B. 1981 – editor of The Nation
- Grant Wahl, A.B. 1996 – sports journalist for Sports Illustrated
- Christine Whelan, A.B. 1999 – contributor to The Wall Street Journal and others, author of Why Smart Men Marry Smart Women
- Alexander Wolff, A.B. 1979 – writer for Sports Illustrated
- Robert Sterling Yard, B.A. 1883 – journalist for the New York Sun and New York Herald; editor-in-chief of The Century Magazine; founder and first president of The Wilderness Society
- James D. Zirin, A.B. 1961 – lawyer, author, and television talk-show host

== Sports ==
- Kwesi Adofo-Mensah – general manager of the Minnesota Vikings
- Bella Alarie, A.B. 2020 – starting professional basketball career in 2020 with the WNBA's Dallas Wings
- Hobey Baker, A.B. 1914 – ice hockey player; college hockey's top individual award is named in his memory
- Carl Barisich – former professional football player, Cleveland Browns and Miami Dolphins
- Danny Barnes – professional baseball pitcher
- Amir Bell (born 1996) – basketball player in the Israel Basketball Premier League
- Moe Berg, A.B. 1923 – professional baseball player and spy
- David Blatt, A.B. 1981 – Israeli-American basketball player and coach (most recently, for the Cleveland Cavaliers)
- Arthur Bluethenthal, 1913 – All-American football player; decorated World War I pilot
- Bill Bradley, A.B. 1965 – former basketball star; member of the Basketball Hall of Fame; former U.S. senator
- Bob Bradley, A.B. 1980 – US National Soccer coach and MLS Cup-winning coach
- Andrew Calof – ice hockey player
- Devin Cannady – professional basketball player with the South Bay Lakers
- Karl Chandler – former professional football player, New York Giants and Detroit Lions
- Mike Chernoff – Cleveland Indians general manager
- Geep Chryst – quarterbacks coach, San Francisco 49ers
- Mike Condon – professional hockey goaltender with the Ottawa Senators
- Jon Dekker – professional football player, Pittsburgh Steelers
- Emerson Dickman – baseball coach (1949–51); his teams won two Eastern League championships and tied one, as the 1951 team reached the College World Series
- Pablo Eisenberg (born 1932) – scholar, social justice advocate, and tennis player
- Keith Elias, A.B. 1993 – former professional football player in the National Football League
- Jonathan Erlichman, A.B. 2012 – process and analytics coach, Tampa Bay Rays; first analytics coach in the history of Major League Baseball
- Paul Fentress, 1936 – Olympic field hockey player
- John Fisher, A.B. 1983 – owner, Oakland Athletics
- Jason Garrett – former professional football player, offensive coordinator, interim head coach, head coach (2010–19) for the Dallas Cowboys
- Charlie Gogolak – former professional football player, Washington Redskins and New England Patriots
- Wycliffe Grousbeck, A.B. 1983 – CEO, governor, and co-owner, Boston Celtics
- Jeff Halpern, A.B. 1999 – current NHL player; plays for the NHL team Los Angeles Kings
- Tora Harris, 2002 – Olympic high jumper
- Sara Hendershot, A.B. 2010 – rower at the 2012 Summer Olympics
- Armond Hill – assistant coach, Los Angeles Clippers; former NBA basketball player, 1976–84
- Edwin Mortimer Hopkins – first ever full-time head football coach at the University of Kansas, also long-time English professor at the school
- Red Howard – football player
- Ariel Hsing – Olympic table tennis player
- Lynn Jennings, A.B. 1983 – Olympic runner, three-time world cross country champion, member of National Distance Running Hall of Fame
- Dick Kazmaier, A.B. 1952 – Heisman Trophy winner 1952
- Zak Keasey – former professional football player, San Francisco 49ers
- Chloe Kim – Olympic snowboarder
- Andrea Leand – tennis player
- Donold Lourie, A.B. 1922 – College Football Hall of Fame inductee
- Larry Lucchino, A.B. 1967 – president and CEO of the Boston Red Sox
- Tyler Lussi, A.B. 2017 – professional soccer player, winner of the 2017 NWSL championship with Portland Thorns FC
- Jesse Marsch, A.B. 1995 – professional soccer player, winner of three MLS championships with D.C. United and the Chicago Fire
- Matt McDonald, B.S. 2015 – distance runner
- Rich McKay, A.B. 1981 – president and general manager, Atlanta Falcons
- Frank McPhee – football player
- Steve Meister – tennis player
- John Messuri – former professional hockey player, Princeton Tigers all-time leading scorer
- Abby Meyers (born 1999) – basketball player for the Dallas Wings of the Women's National Basketball Association
- Meredith Michaels-Beerbaum – American-born German showjumper
- Steve Mills – president of the New York Knicks
- Cook Neilson, A.B. 1967 – motorcycle racer, member of American Motorcycle Association Hall of Fame
- Dennis Norman, 2001 – former professional football player, San Diego Chargers
- Ross Ohlendorf – former MLB pitcher for the Washington Nationals
- George Parros – professional ice hockey player, for the 2007 Stanley Cup champion Anaheim Ducks
- Geoff Petrie, A.B. 1970 – former NBA player; current president of basketball operations for the Sacramento Kings
- Crista Samaras, A.B. 1999 – former lacrosse player and coach
- Mark Shapiro – Toronto Blue Jays general manager; two-time MLB Executive of the Year
- Brian Taylor – former ABA and NBA basketball player, 1972–82
- John Thompson III, 1988 – basketball coach at Georgetown
- Soren Thompson, 2005 – fencer, NCAA épée champion, Junior Olympic champion, Maccabiah Games silver medalist, 2x Olympic fencer, team world champion
- Orlando E. Toledo (born 1964) -- former polo player and motocross rider
- Ross Tucker, 2000 – former professional football player, sports columnist
- Bob Tufts – Major League Baseball pitcher
- Terdema Ussery, A.B. 1981 – president and CEO of the NBA's Dallas Mavericks basketball team
- Will Venable – outfielder for the Texas Rangers
- Maia Weintraub (born 2002) – NCAA foil champion, national champion, and Olympic fencer
- Spencer Weisz (born 1995) – American-Israeli basketball player for Hapoel Haifa of the Israeli Premier League
- Kevin Westgarth – NHL player; plays for the NHL team Los Angeles Kings
- Lauren Wilkinson – 2012 Summer Olympics silver medalist
- Erica Wu – Olympic table tennis player
- Chris Young – starting pitcher for the Kansas City Royals
- Ben Zinn – international soccer player and academic at Georgia Tech

== Entertainment ==
Name	Affiliation	Notes	Refs
Baiyu	A.B. 2008	Singer-songwriter and actress	
Erik Barnouw	A.B. 1929	Writer, critic, documentary filmmaker, Columbia University professor	
Dale Bell	A.B. 1960	Producer, director, screenwriter and cinematographer, best known for documentary Woodstock	
Roger Berlind	A.B. 1954	Produced or co-produced over 40 plays and musicals on Broadway (winning over 60 Tony Awards, including 12 for best production), as well as many off-Broadway and regional productions	
Stephen Bogardus	A.B. 1976	Actor	
Brooks Bowman	A.B. 1936	Jazz composer and writer of the song "East of the Sun (and West of the Moon)"	
Dean Cain	A.B. 1988	Actor (Clark Kent/Superman in the TV series Lois & Clark: The New Adventures of Superman)	
David Aaron Carpenter	A.B. 2008	Violist, violinist, winner of the Avery Fisher Career Grant and Rolex Protege Prize, Warner Classics recording artist	
Ethan Coen	A.B. 1979	Academy Award-winning filmmaker (No Country for Old Men, O Brother, Where Art Thou?, Fargo)	
David Duchovny	A.B. 1982	Actor, won Golden Globe Awards for The X-Files and Californication	
Molly Ephraim	A.B. 2008	Stage, film, and television actress	
José Ferrer	A.B. 1933	Academy Award and Tony Award-winning actor	
Mark Feuerstein	A.B. 1993	Film and television actor (Royal Pains)	
Ruth Gerson	A.B. 1992	Singer, songwriter	
Bo Goldman	A.B. 1953	Co-winner of the 1976 Academy Award for Best Writing, Screenplay Adapted From Other Material (One Flew Over the Cuckoo's Nest); winner of the 1981 Academy Award for Best Writing, Screenplay Written Directly for the Screen (Melvin and Howard)	
Karron Graves	A.B. 1999	Actress	
Nicholas Hammond		Actor (The Sound of Music, The Amazing Spider-Man)	
Charles Horn	Ph.D.	Writer (Robot Chicken)	
Andrew Jarecki	A.B. 1985	Academy Award-nominated documentary filmmaker, Capturing the Friedmans	
Eugene Jarecki	A.B. 1991	Documentary filmmaker, Why We Fight	
Robert L. Johnson	A.M. 1972	Founded BET in 1980; member of the board for US Airways, General Mills, and Hilton Hotels	
Kwanza Jones	A.B. 1993	Billboard-charting singer, songwriter and actress	
Stanley Jordan	A.B. 1981	Jazz guitarist	
Larissa Kelly	A.B. 2002	Fifth-ranked all-time Jeopardy! winner, including co-Champion (with David Madden '03 and Brad Rutter) of the Jeopardy! All-Star Games tournament	
Ellie Kemper	A.B. 2002	Actress (Erin Hannon on The Office)	
Alan Klingenstein	A.B. 1978	Film producer, distributor, and entertainment executive. Credits include Two Family House, winner of the Audience Award at the Sundance Film Festival	
Gilbert Levine	A.B. 1971	Conductor	
Joshua Logan	A.B. 1931	Director (Camelot, South Pacific); winner (or co-winner) of seven Tony Awards, co-winner of a Pulitzer Prize, nominated three times for Academy Award	
David Madden	A.B. 2003	Fourth-ranked all-time Jeopardy! winner including co-Champion of the Jeopardy! All-Star Games Tournament (with Larissa Kelly '02 and Brad Rutter), founder and executive director of the National History Bee and Bowl, the International History Olympiad, and International Academic Competitions	
Craig Mazin	A.B. 1992	Screenwriter (Scary Movie 3, Scary Movie 4)	
Cara McCollum	A.B. 2015	Miss New Jersey 2013	
Myron McCormick	A.B. 1933	Actor; winner of a Tony Award in 1950	
Douglas McGrath	A.B. 1980	Actor, director, and screenwriter (Bullets Over Broadway)	
Wentworth Miller	A.B. 1995	Film and TV actor (Michael Scofield on Prison Break)	
Jeff Moss	A.B. 1963	Lyricist, composer, poet; co-creator of Sesame Street; former member of Princeton Triangle Club; winner of fifteen Emmy Awards	
Rose Catherine Pinkney	A.B. 1986	Television executive with Paramount and Twentieth Century Fox	
Jane Randall	A.B. 2013	Third place contestant on America's Next Top Model, Cycle 15; currently signed to modelling agency IMG Models	
Wayne Rogers	A.B. 1955	Actor (Trapper John McIntyre on M*A*S*H)	
Barbara Romer	A.B. 1993	Film and theatrical producer; founder of the Globe Theatre	
Marc Rosen	A.B. 1998	Film and television producer, known for his work on the Harry Potter film franchise and the TV series Threshold	
Brooke Shields	A.B. 1987	Model/actress (The Blue Lagoon, TV series Suddenly Susan), former member of Princeton Triangle Club	
Brett Simon	A.B. 1997	Director (Assassination of a High School President)	
Jimmy Stewart	B.S. 1932	Academy Award-winning actor (former member of Princeton Triangle Club), aviator, brigadier general in the United States Air Force; honorary degree in 1947	
Robert Taber		Actor	
Bretaigne Windust	A.B. 1929	Film director, producer	

== Art and architecture ==
- Stan Allen, M.Arch. – dean of School of Architecture, Princeton University
- Leslie Ayres – architect, 1926 winner of Princeton Prize in Architecture
- Merritt Bucholz – partner of Irish-based Bucholz | McEvoy Architects; professor of Architecture at University of Limerick
- Thomas S. Buechner – founding director of the Corning Museum of Glass; director of the Brooklyn Museum
- Johanna Burton – director of the Museum of Contemporary Art, Los Angeles
- Donald Drew Egbert, A.B. 1924, M.Arch. 1927 – art historian and Princeton professor
- Michael Graves – architect, designer and Princeton professor
- Jodi Hauptman, A.B. 1986 – art historian and curator
- Jim Lee, A.B. Psychology 1986 – comic book artist, known for work on X-Men, Batman; a founder of Image Comics
- Indrani Pal-Chaudhuri, A.B. Anthropology – photographer, director and digital artist, star of Bravo's 2010 docu-series Double Exposure about her photography
- Bill Pierce, A.B. 1957 – freelance photographer for Time
- Demetri Porphyrios, M.Arch. 1974, Ph.D. 1980 – architect and architectural theorist
- Frank Stella – artist
- William Turnbull Jr. – architect and fellow of the American Institute of Architects
- Margaret Rose Vendryes Ph.D. 1997 – visual artist, curator, and art historian
- Robert Venturi, A.B. 1947, M.F.A. 1950 – architect, Pritzker Prize laureate 1991
- Marion Sims Wyeth – architect of Mar-a-Lago and other mansions

== Other ==
- Thomas B. Craighead – Presbyterian minister, president of Davidson Academy and Cumberland College in Nashville, Tennessee
- Collins Denny Jr., 1921 – pro-segregationist lawyer
- David W. Doyle, '49 – Central Intelligence Agency officer; author
- Cate Edwards, '04 – daughter of two-time presidential candidate and 2004 Democratic Vice Presidential nominee John Edwards
- John Frame, '61 – Reformed theologian
- Donald B. Fullerton, 1913 – missionary and founder of the Princeton Christian Fellowship
- Zelda Harris, '07 – former child actress, known for her starring role in the Spike Lee dramedy Crooklyn
- James Hogue – attended Princeton under the fraudulent persona of "Alexi Indris Santana", 1989–1991
- Dario Hunter, '04 – the first Muslim-born person to be ordained a rabbi
- Jeffrey R. MacDonald, '65 – subject of Joe McGinnis' best seller Fatal Vision; Green Beret physician convicted of murdering his wife and two children at Fort Bragg
- Joseph (Lyle) Menendez – convicted murderer, left Princeton in 1988 following plagiarism charges
- Michelle Obama, '85 – First Lady of the United States, wife of United States President Barack Obama
- Zhuo Qun Song, '19 – currently the most highly decorated International Mathematical Olympiad (IMO) contestant, with five gold medals and one bronze medal
- Richard Aaker Trythall, '63 – composer and pianist, winner of the 1964 Rome Prize in Musical Composition, fellow and music liaison of the American Academy in Rome
- Peter Aaron Van Dorn – lawyer, judge and planter from Mississippi
- John C. Whitcomb, '48 – young earth creationist

== In fiction ==
Listed in alphabetical order by title name.

- 24 – President Charles Logan graduated from Princeton University.
- 30 Rock – Jack Donaghy is an alumnus; multiple episodes center on his college experience.
- Across the Universe – the character Max attends Princeton, but drops out.
- Atlanta – Earnest "Earn" Marks attended Princeton University before dropping out
- Batman Begins – Bruce Wayne attended Princeton University, although he chose not to continue his education there after returning home (it is unknown whether he had completed his undergraduate school education and was attending graduate school or if he was dropping out of college).
- A Beautiful Mind – tells of the mathematician John Forbes Nash Jr.'s initial days at Princeton University. Although the film is a fictionalized biography, in real life Nash did receive his doctorate from Princeton and was a Princeton professor.
- The Big Bang Theory – Leonard Hofstadter attended and graduated from Princeton, and Amy Farrah Fowler served a fellowship there until Sheldon Cooper proposed to her.
- Boardwalk Empire – James "Jimmy" Darmody attended Princeton, but dropped out to enlist in World War I, disappointing his guardian Enoch Thompson.
- Burn After Reading – Osbourne Cox, the lead played by John Malkovich, was a Princeton graduate, Class of 1973, and in a scene at a fictional Princeton Club, leads a fast-tempo rendition of Princeton's anthem, "Old Nassau".
- The Caine Mutiny – Willis Seward "Willie" Keith graduated from Princeton University before joining the Navy.
- The Change-Up – Dave Lockwood graduated from Princeton University.
- Charles in Charge – Charles gets accepted as a graduate student to Princeton.
- A Cinderella Story – the characters played by Hilary Duff and Chad Michael Murray will be attending Princeton at the end of the movie.
- Commander in Chief – Kelly Ludlow, the press secretary played by Ever Carradine graduated from Princeton.
- The Cosby Show – Sondra Huxtable and her (future) husband Elvin Tibideaux graduated from Princeton.
- Cruel Intentions – Marci Greenbaum, Tara Reid's character, was accepted into Princeton.
- Designated Survivor – Tom Kirkman, Secretary of Housing and Urban Development turned president of the United States, is a Princeton alumnus.
- Doogie Howser, M.D. – the namesake child prodigy graduated from Princeton at the age of 10 in 1983 and received his medical license at age 14.
- Everwood – Amy Abbott is accepted to Princeton.
- Family Ties – "Young Republican" Alex P. Keaton (Michael J. Fox) spends the first two seasons of the series preparing to attend Princeton.
- The Flintstones – in the 1961 episode entitled "Flintstone of Prinstone", Fred briefly attends Princeton's prehistoric counterpart, "Prinstone University", as a part-time student; in the 1964 episode "Cinderellastone", Fred's dream character also attended Prinstone.
- The Fresh Prince of Bel-Air – Princeton is Philip's alma mater; his son, Carlton, enrolls in Princeton by the final episode.
- Gilmore Girls – Rory Gilmore is accepted into Princeton University.
- The Girl Next Door – Eli is mentioned as having been accepted to Princeton.
- Good in Bed, novel by Jennifer Weiner – protagonist Cannie Shapiro is a Princeton alumna.
- In Her Shoes (1991), a novel by Jennifer Weiner – Rose Feller is a Princeton grad. Her younger sister Maggie camps out in a Princeton library.
- Leatherheads – the character of Carter Rutherford is a star Princeton quarterback.
- Left Behind series – Cameron "Buck" Williams is a Princeton grad.
- Lord Kalvan of Otherwhen, science fiction novel by H. Beam Piper – Calvin Morrison had been a theology student at Princeton, but dropped out to join the U.S. Army and fight in the Korean War. He later becomes an officer with the Pennsylvania State Police and transports to another timeline.
- Mad Men – Paul Kinsey is a Princeton graduate (class of '55). In "My Old Kentucky Home" (season 3, episode 3), Kinsey's classmate Jeffrey, a drug dealer, reminisces about the Tigertones a cappella group.
- Mars Attacks! – President James Dale (Jack Nicholson) is a Princeton alumnus.
- The Mindy Project – the main character, Mindy Lahiri, attended Princeton.
- Never Have I Ever – the main character, Devi Vishwakumar, is accepted into Princeton University.
- No Hard Feelings – The film is set in the summer before Percy's (played by Andrew Barth Feldman) freshman year at Princeton.
- Numb3rs – the characters of Charlie Eppes and Larry Fleinhardt are Princeton alumni (Charlie graduated at age 16 and Larry at age 19).
- The Princess Diaries 2: Royal Engagement – Anne Hathaway's character graduated from Princeton.
- The Reluctant Fundamentalist, novel – the characters Changez and Erica are Princeton grads.
- Risky Business – Tom Cruise's character gets into Princeton after an unconventional interview at his own home.
- Rubber – one of the spectators ("film buff Ethan") appears wearing an orange-embroidered black baseball cap reading "PRINCETO".
- The Rule of Four, mystery novel – the protagonists are Princeton students, and the museum and its collections play a central role in the plot.
- Salt – Angelina Jolie's character Evelyn Salt went to Princeton.
- Scandal – Olivia Pope graduated from Princeton.
- The Simpsons – Cecil Terwilliger, the brother of Sideshow Bob, is an alumnus (Sideshow Bob refers to it as the years Cecil spent in Clown College); Snake also attended, but took a year off, presumably never to return.
- South Pacific – Lt. Joe Cable attended Princeton.
- South Park – Mayor McDaniels
- The Sun Also Rises – Robert Cohn is a Princeton graduate.
- The Talented Mr. Ripley – Dickie Greenleaf (played by Jude Law) attended Princeton, and the title character Tom Ripley pretends he is a Princeton alumnus.
- There's Something About Mary – Mary attended Princeton University, as did her ex-boyfriend "Woogie", who was also holder of a scholarship from Princeton
- Thirtysomething – Hope Murdoch Steadman, portrayed by Mel Harris, graduated from Princeton. Harris' real-life father (Warren Harris) was a football coach at Princeton in the 1970s.
- This Side of Paradise, semi-autobiographical novel by F. Scott Fitzgerald, a Princeton alumnus himself - protagonist Amory Blaine attends Princeton.
- The War of the Worlds, 1938 radio adaptation – Professor Richard Pierson of the Princeton Observatory, portrayed by Orson Welles
- Watchmen, a graphic novel created by writer Alan Moore, artist Dave Gibbons, and colorist John Higgins – Dr. Jon Osterman/Doctor Manhattan, born 1929, attended Princeton University in 1948–1958 and graduated with a Ph.D. in atomic physics.
- Weeds – the character Megan is accepted into Princeton.
- The West Wing – former Deputy Communications Director Sam Seaborn (Rob Lowe) is a magna cum laude Princeton graduate.

== See also ==
- History of Princeton University
- List of Nobel laureates affiliated with Princeton University as alumni or faculty
