= Martha M. Muñoz =

American evolutionary biologist

Martha Muñoz
- Born: 1985 (age 40–41)
- Education: Boston University (BA); Harvard University (PhD)
- Occupation: Evolutionary biologist

Martha M. Muñoz (born May 1985) is an American evolutionary biologist and an associate professor of Ecology and Evolutionary Biology at Yale University. She is also an associate curator for the Division of Vertebrate Zoology at the Yale Peabody Museum. In particular, Muñoz researches the influence of biomechanics and behavior on evolution in reptiles, amphibians, and fishes. In 2024, she was named a MacArthur Fellow.

== Biography ==
Muñoz grew up in the New York City borough of Queens, and is the daughter of Cuban immigrants. From a young age, she held an interest in the natural world, visiting public parks and museums to nurture her passion. With this limited access to nature, but profound desire to be in it, she also often found herself at gardens and zoos. She received her BA in biology from Boston University in 2007 and then completed a Fulbright research fellowship in the National Museum of Natural Sciences in Madrid, Spain. She earned her PhD in organismic and evolutionary biology from Harvard University in 2014. While at Harvard, she worked in the lab of evolutionary biologist Jonathan Losos. Following her PhD, she was a postdoctoral researcher at Australian National University and Duke University. In 2017, she was hired as an assistant professor in the Department of Biological Sciences at Virginia Tech. She became an assistant professor in Yale University's Department of Ecology and Evolutionary Biology in 2019. In Munoz's research, she discovered that lizards can thermoregulate in habitats because of differences in behavior.

== Selected publication ==
- Muñoz, M. M., Stimola, M. A., Algar, A. C., Conover, A., Rodriguez, A. J., Landestoy, M. A., Bakken, G. S., & Losos, J. B. (2014). Evolutionary stasis and lability in thermal physiology in a group of tropical lizards. Proceedings of the Royal Society B: Biological Sciences, 281(1778), 20132433. https://doi.org/10.1098/rspb.2013.2433
- Muñoz, M. M., & Losos, J. B. (2018). Thermoregulatory Behavior Simultaneously Promotes and Forestalls Evolution in a Tropical Lizard. The American Naturalist, 191(1), E15–E26. https://doi.org/10.1086/694779
- Bodensteiner, B. L., Agudelo‐Cantero, G. A., Arietta, A. Z. A., Gunderson, A. R., Muñoz, M. M., Refsnider, J. M., & Gangloff, E. J. (2021). Thermal adaptation revisited: How conserved are thermal traits of reptiles and amphibians? Journal of Experimental Zoology Part A: Ecological and Integrative Physiology, 335(1), 173–194. https://doi.org/10.1002/jez.2414

== Awards and honors ==
- Muñoz was the recipient in 2021 of the Carl Gans Award and in 2022 of the George A. Bartholomew Award from the Society for Integrative and Comparative Biology, the first person to receive both awards. She is also a 2017 winner of the Early Career Investigator Award from the American Society of Naturalists.
