= Shane Campbell-Staton =

American evolutionary biologist

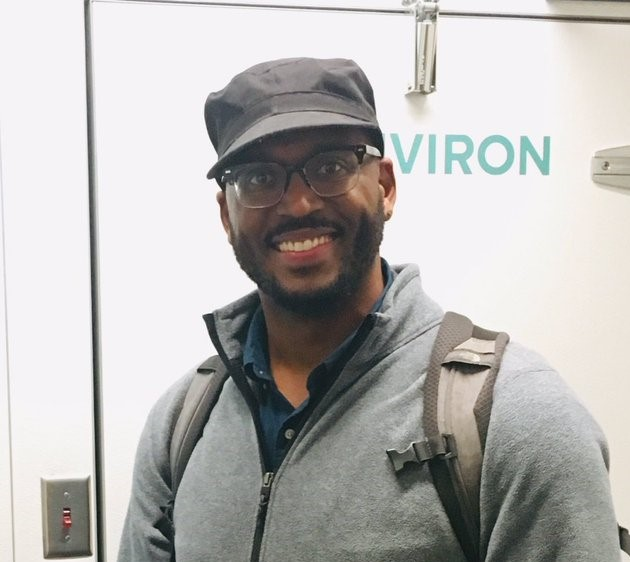
- Campbell-Staton in front of one of the cryochambers at his UCLA lab
- Education: University of Rochester (BSc); Harvard University (PhD)
- Scientific career
- Workplaces: University of California, Los Angeles; Princeton University
- Thesis: Phylogeographic history and temperature-mediated evolution of the green anole, Anolis carolinensis
- Doctoral advisor: Jonathan Losos, Scott V. Edwards

Shane C. Campbell-Staton is an American evolutionary biologist. Since July 2021, he has been an assistant professor in the ecology and evolutionary biology department at Princeton, where he leads a research group. His work is on how phenotypes respond to human activity that affects the environment. He also hosts the podcast 'Biology of Superheroes' together with Arien Darby.

== Education and career ==
Campbell-Staton grew up in South Carolina. He did his BSc in Ecology and Evolutionary Biology at the University of Rochester. He then studied for his PhD at Harvard University under Jonathan Losos and Scott V. Edwards. He wrote his dissertation, titled Phylogeographic history and temperature-mediated evolution of the green anole, Anolis carolinensis on the evolution of the green anole lizard. After his PhD he became a National Science Foundation Research Fellow at the University of Illinois Champaign-Urbana, working with Julian Catchen, and the University of Montana where he worked with Zac Cheviron. He became an assistant professor at UCLA in July 2018, where he worked in the Ecology and Evolutionary Biology (EEB) Department and the Institute for Society and Genetics (ISG). Since July 2021, he has been an assistant professor at Princeton in its EEB department, where he leads a research group.

Since 2023, he has been the host of the PBS documentary series Human Footprint, in which he explores the ways in which human beings have transformed the planet. He is also the narrator for the PBS series Evolution Earth.

== Research ==
Campbell-Staton initially started his research in the field of herpetology. He became interested in the effect of changes in the environment, such as climate change, on the evolution of species. His dissertation focused on cold-tolerance in the green anole, for which he studied five different populations in the United States. He studied their cold-adaptation by looking at the righting reflex of the animals, which involves turning the lizards on their back at different temperatures and determining whether they are able to turn themselves back. He found that the northern populations, which live in a colder climate, were more cold-adapted. After his fieldwork in 2013 the areas where his study populations live were hit by a particularly cold winter. He showed that after this winter, the southern populations in Texas were more cold-adapted.

He also studies the phenomenon of tusklessness in African elephant populations, specifically the population in the Gorongosa National Park. He studies both the genetic causes of this phenomenon, as well as the consequences for how the elephants interact with the environment. He furthermore tries to answer the question of why the tusklessness is mainly present in the female elephants.

== Biology of Superheroes ==
Campbell-Staton bought his first comic book, Superman vs. Muhammad Ali, in 2013. This led him to think about the biology of the superheroes in these comics, which eventually led to the start of the Biology of Superheroes podcast, which he started in December 2017. His first two episodes focused on Spider-Man, and later episodes included topics such as The Flash and Jurassic Park. He also teaches a Biology of Superheroes course at UCLA, where he uses topics from comics and other sources to teach biology.
