= 21st Mississippi Infantry Regiment =

- Active: 1861–1865
- Country: Confederate States
- Allegiance: Mississippi
- Branch: Army
- Type: Infantry
- Size: Regiment
- Battles: American Civil War: Battle of Antietam; Battle of Chancellorsville; Battle of Gettysburg; Battle of Chickamauga; Battle of the Wilderness; Siege of Petersburg; Battle of Appomattox Court House

Commanders
- Notable commanders: William L. Brandon; Benjamin G. Humphreys

The 21st Regiment, Mississippi Infantry was a Confederate infantry regiment from Mississippi in the American Civil War. The regiment was involved in several well-known battles including the battles of Antietam, Chancellorsville, Gettysburg and Chickamauga.

== History ==
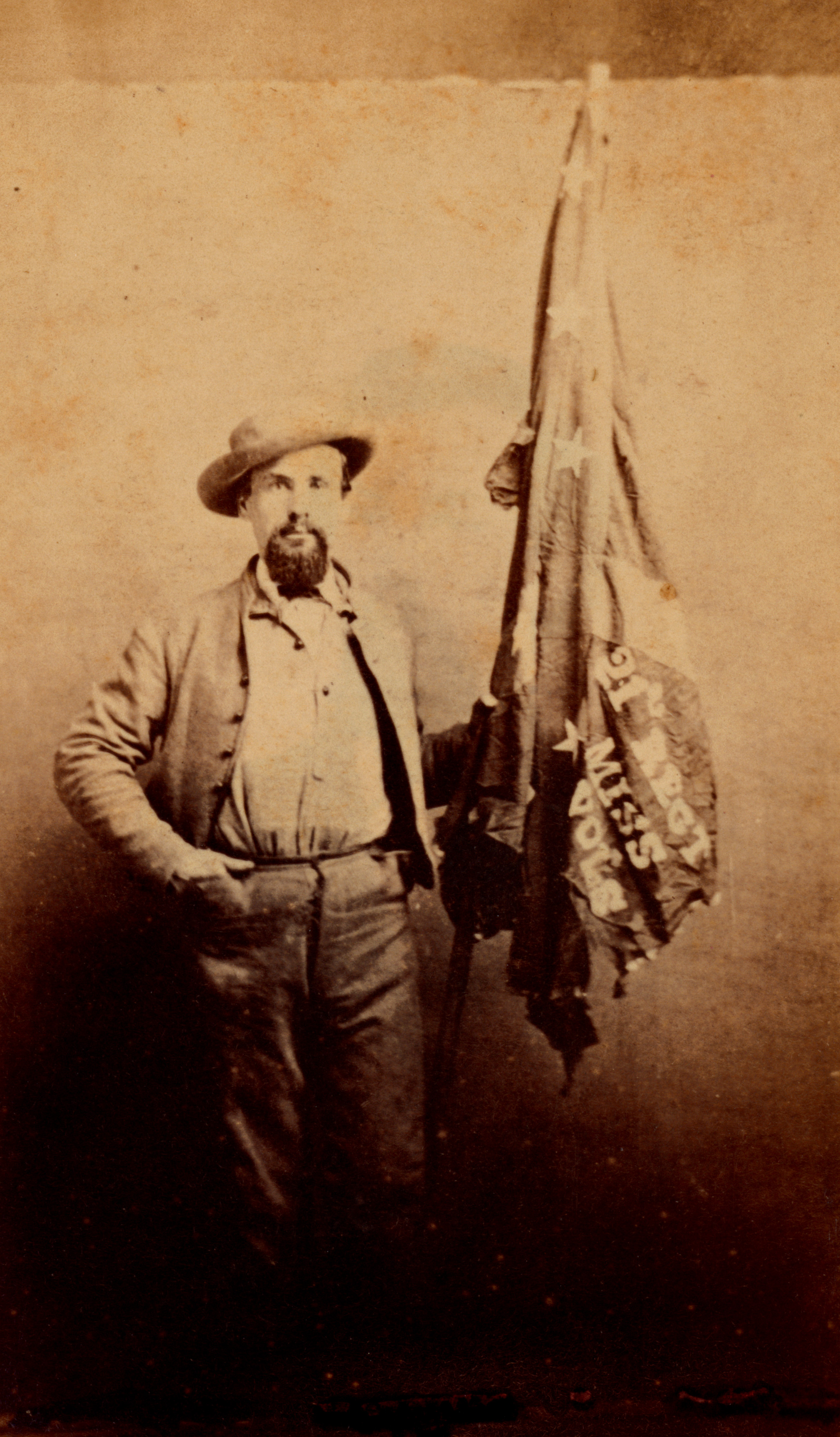
Private Austin Augustus Trescott of Company A, 21st Mississippi Infantry Regiment holding tattered regimental flag after being taken prisoner in April 1865.

The various companies of what would become the 21st Mississippi were raised independently in May–August 1861 and travelled to Manassas, Virginia, where they were organized into a regiment in October of that year. In April, 1862, the 21st regiment reported a total force of 684 men. As part of General Richard Griffith's 3rd Brigade, the regiment took part in the Seven Days Battles near Richmond in June–July 1862. Afterwards the 21st was attached to Barksdale's brigade and saw action at the Battle of Antietam and the Battle of Fredericksburg. In 1863, the regiment was part of the Chancellorsville campaign, during which it held a sparsely-defended position at the stone wall of Marye's Heights in the face of heavy opposition. At Gettysburg, the 21st regiment was involved in heavy fighting, during which the brigade commander General Barksdale was mortally wounded.

After the retreat from Gettysburg, Colonel Benjamin G. Humphreys of the 21st was promoted to brigadier general and the regiment was moved south to Georgia, where they fought at the Battle of Chickamauga. The regiment joined the Knoxville campaign in the fall of 1863, including the Battle of Fort Sanders.

In the spring of 1864, the 21st regiment moved to Virginia, taking part in the Battle of the Wilderness, the Battle of Cold Harbor, and the defense of Petersburg. At the Battle of Berryville in September, General Humphreys was severely wounded, subsequently Major George L. Donald took command of Humphreys' brigade, with the 21st regiment commanded by Colonel William H. Fitzgerald. The 21st, which by that point only consisted of 4 officers and 44 men, then surrendered with Robert E. Lee's forces at Appomattox on April 9, 1865.

== Commanders ==
- Colonel William L. Brandon
- Colonel Benjamin G. Humphreys, promoted to Brigadier General July 1863.
- Colonel Daniel N. Mood
- Lieutenant Colonel John Sims (killed in action)
- Lieutenant Colonel William H. Fitzgerald

== Organization ==
Companies of the 21st regiment:

- Company A, "Volunteer Southrons" of Vicksburg.
- Company B, transferred to Second Battalion, Mississippi Infantry.
- Company C, "Stevens Rifles" of Brookhaven.
- Company D, "Jeff Davis Guards" of Woodville.
- Company E, "Hurricane Rifles" of Wilkinson County.
- Company F, "Tallahatchie Rifles" of Charleston.
- Company G, of Canton.
- Company H, "Warren Volunteers" of Bovina.
- Company I, "Sunflower Guards" of Sunflower County.
- Company K, "New Albany Grays" of New Albany.
- Company L, "Vicksburg Confederates", of Vicksburg

== See also ==
- List of Mississippi Civil War Confederate units
