= Don Oberdorfer =

American journalist (1931–2015)

- Born: Donald Oberdorfer Jr. May 28, 1931; Atlanta, Georgia, United States
- Died: July 23, 2015 (aged 84); Washington, D.C., United States
- Education: Princeton University
- Occupations: Journalist, author, professor
- Spouse: Laura Oberdorfer

Donald Oberdorfer Jr. (May 28, 1931 – July 23, 2015) was an American professor at the Paul H. Nitze School of Advanced International Studies (SAIS) at Johns Hopkins University with a specialty in Korea, and was a journalist for 38 years, 25 of them with The Washington Post. He is the author of five books and several academic papers. His book on Mike Mansfield, Senator Mansfield: The Extraordinary Life of a Great American Statesman and Diplomat, won the D.B. Hardeman Prize in 2003.

== Career ==
Oberdorfer was born in Atlanta, Georgia and attended Druid Hills High School. He later graduated from Princeton University in 1952, and went to South Korea as a U.S. Army lieutenant after the signing of the armistice that ended the Korean War. In 1955 he joined The Charlotte Observer, and eventually found a job with The Washington Post. During the next 25 years, he worked for The Post, serving as White House correspondent, Northeast Asia correspondent, and diplomatic correspondent. He retired from the paper in 1993. In 1995, Oberdorfer, who taught at Princeton University on three separate occasions, authored the commemorative coffee-table publication celebrating the University's 250th anniversary. In his work Princeton University: The First 250 Years, Oberdorfer described Princeton as "a national institution before there was a nation."

At the Nitze school, beyond his teaching position, Oberdorfer served as chairman of the U.S.-Korea Institute from its inauguration in 2006, and was named chairman emeritus in 2013. In 2008, Don Oberdorfer was awarded the "Van Fleet Award" by The Korea Society for his contributions to advancing knowledge and understanding of the context of South Korea–United States relations.

== Personal ==
Oberdorfer was married to the former Laura Klein. He had two children, Daniel and Karen Oberdorfer, and a brother, Eugene. He died on Thursday, July 23, 2015, in Washington, D.C. at the age of 84. According to his wife Laura, the cause of his death was complications related to Alzheimer's disease. To honor Oberdorfer's journalistic career, Professor Stephan Haggard said it "was the combination of a large picture with attention not only to historical detail but the unique perspectives of the participants".

== Bibliography ==
=== Books ===
External videos
- Booknotes interview with Oberdorfer on The Turn, October 27, 1991, C-SPAN
- Presentation by Oberdorfer on The Two Koreas, November 14, 1997, C-SPAN
- Panel discussion featuring Oberdorfer on The Two Koreas, December 7, 2001, C-SPAN
- Tribute to former Senator Mike Mansfield, with Oberdorfer discussing his biography of Mansfield, October 14, 2003, C-SPAN

- Oberdorfer, Don (1971). Tet!. Garden City, New York: Doubleday. LCCN 73160887. OCLC 196133. S2CID 160042970. Finalist for the National Book Award.

Published in a revised and updated edition: Oberdorfer, Don (2001). Tet!: The Turning Point in the Vietnam War. Baltimore: Johns Hopkins University Press. doi:10.56021/9780801867033. ISBN 978-0-8018-6703-3. LCCN 00050647. OCLC 45137661.

- Oberdorfer, Don (1991). The Turn: From the Cold War to a New Era: the United States and the Soviet Union, 1983-1990. New York City: Poseidon Press. ISBN 978-0-671-70783-5. LCCN 91022547. OCLC 23940608. S2CID 157315301.

Published in an updated edition: Oberdorfer, Don (1998). From the Cold War to a New Era: The United States and the Soviet Union, 1983-1991. Baltimore: Johns Hopkins University Press. doi:10.56021/9780801859229. ISBN 978-0-8018-5922-9. LCCN 97048386. OCLC 1069039348.

- Oberdorfer, Don (1995). Princeton University: The First 250 Years. Princeton, New Jersey: Trustees of Princeton University. ISBN 978-0-691-01122-6. LCCN 95020342. OCLC 32625604. S2CID 151172442.
- Oberdorfer, Don (1997). The Two Koreas: A Contemporary History. Massachusetts: Basic Books. ISBN 978-0-201-40927-7. LCCN 2013030124. OCLC 41211292. S2CID 221909342.

Published in a revised and updated edition: Oberdorfer, Don (2001). The Two Koreas: Revised And Updated A Contemporary History. New York City: Basic Books. ISBN 978-0-465-05162-5. LCCN 2001043486. OCLC 47831650.
Published in a revised and updated third edition: Oberdorfer, Don; Carlin, Robert (2014). The Two Koreas: A Contemporary History. New York City: Basic Books. ISBN 978-0-465-03123-8. LCCN 2013030124. OCLC 868863869.

- Oberdorfer, Don (2003). Senator Mansfield: The Extraordinary Life of a Great American Statesman and Diplomat. Washington, D.C.: Smithsonian Books. ISBN 978-1-58834-166-2. LCCN 2003045553. OCLC 51900292. S2CID 160451792.

=== Articles & Papers ===
- Oberdorfer, Don (April 27, 1979). "News and the Perception of Reality". Proceedings of the American Philosophical Society. 123 (2). University of Pennsylvania Press: 129–130. ISSN 0003-049X. JSTOR 986235.
- Oberdorfer, Don (1999). "Seeking Truth in Action". The Wilson Quarterly. Vol. 23, no. 3. Woodrow Wilson International Center for Scholars. pp. 81–90. ISSN 0363-3276. JSTOR 40259928. Archived from the original on April 27, 2025.
- Oberdorfer, Don; Gregg, Donald (June 22, 2005). "A Moment to Seize With North Korea". The Washington Post. ISSN 0190-8286. Archived from the original on April 6, 2025.
- Oberdorfer, Don (November 17, 2005). "Policy Forum 05-93A: The United States and South Korea: Can This Alliance Last?". Nautilus Institute for Security and Sustainability. Archived from the original on April 3, 2025.
- Oberdorfer, Don; Izumi, Hajime. "The United States, Japan, and the Korean Peninsula: Coordinating Policies and Objectives". National Security Archive. Archived from the original on April 3, 2025.
