= Jodi Hauptman =

American art historian

- Born: Jodi Anne Hauptman; October 20, 1964 (age 61); United States
- Occupations: Art historian Curator
- Spouse: Gregory A. Clarick

Academic background
- Education: Princeton University; Yale University
- Thesis: Vision and Spectatorship in the Work of Joseph Cornell: Stargazing in the Cinema (1995)

Academic work
- Discipline: Art history
- Sub-discipline: Modern art
- Institutions: Museum of Modern Art

Jodi Anne Hauptman (born October 20, 1964) is an American art historian and curator. Hauptman is the Senior Curator of Prints and Drawings at the Museum of Modern Art.

== Career ==
Hauptman graduated from the Smithtown Central School District in 1982. She then earned a Bachelor of Arts from Princeton University in 1986, and later received a Master of Arts and a Doctor of Philosophy in Art History from Yale University in 1995. She wrote a doctoral dissertation on the artist Joseph Cornell.

In 2001, Hauptman received the Charles C. Eldredge Prize from the Smithsonian American Art Museum for her book on Cornell published two years earlier. A year later, she joined the Museum of Modern Art, and was promoted to Senior Curator of Prints and Drawings there in 2014. There, Hauptman has organized exhibitions on the artists Paul Cézanne, Edgar Degas, Fernand Léger, Henri Matisse, and Georges Seurat, while publishing on others such as Sonia Delaunay-Terk, Odilon Redon, Medardo Rosso, Léopold Survage, and Sophie Taeuber-Arp, in addition to Cornell.

== See also ==
- List of Princeton University alumni
- List of Yale University people
