= Sylvia Hurtado =

Educational psychologist (born 1957)

- Born: November 3, 1957 (age 69)
- Citizenship: American
- Occupation: Distinguished Professor
- Awards: Sidney Suslow Scholar Award International Latino Book Award American Association of Hispanics in Higher Education (AAHHE) Faculty Award

Academic background
- Education: Princeton University Harvard University University of California, Los Angeles (UCLA)
- Thesis: Campus racial climates and educational outcomes (1990)
- Doctoral advisor: Alexander Astin

Academic work
- Discipline: Education
- Institutions: UCLA

Sylvia Hurtado is a educational psychologist known for her empirical research on how race, achievement, and institutional factors shape student development and racial equity in higher education. Hurtado holds the position of Distinguished Professor of Education in the School of Education and Information Studies at the University of California, Los Angeles (UCLA). She holds honorary doctorate degrees from Denison University (2006) and Northeastern University (2008).

Hurtado is the 2027-2028 president of the American Educational Research Association (AERA), and has been a member of the organization since graduate school. She is an elected member of the National Academy of Education, the American Association of Hispanics in Higher Education (AAHHE), and the American Academy of Arts and Sciences (The Academy).

Hurtado won International Latino Book Awards in 2016 and 2017 for each of her two co-edited book publications: “Hispanic Serving institutions: Advancing Research and Transformative Practice” and “The Magic Key: The Educational Journey of Mexican Americans from K-12 to College and Beyond” . In 2011, she won the AAHHE faculty award, which was re-named "The AAHHE Sylvia Hurtado University Faculty Award in 2026". In 2022, the Association for Institutional Research awarded Hurtado the Sidney Suslow Scholar award in recognition of her significant contributions to institutional research.

== Biography ==
Sylvia Hurtado was born on November 3, 1957 in a segregated area of San Antonio, Texas. As a first-generation undergraduate student, Hurtado attended Princeton University and obtained a Artium Baccalaureus degree in Sociology in 1980. She then went on to receive a Master's of Education from Harvard University in 1983. Hurtado then pursued a Ph.D. from UCLA while simultaneously working as a research analyst at the Higher Education Research Institute from 1987 to 1990. Under the guidance of her graduate advisor, Alexander Astin, Hurtado completed and published her dissertation "Campus racial climates and educational outcomes" in 1990.

As a postdoctoral researcher, Hurtado continued to publish empirical research surrounding education, including her 1997 article: "Effects of college transition and perceptions of the campus racial climate on Latino college students' sense of belonging". She has collaborated with researchers such as Walter R. Allen, and Patricia Gurin. She has published articles in academic journals including the American Journal of Education.

Hurtado became an associate professor at the University of Michigan and served as director for the university's Center for the Study of Higher and Postsecondary Education for 3 years. She worked at the University of Michigan for 11 years before she began working as faculty at UCLA in 2004.

== Research ==
As a minority Latina college student, Hurtado's academic experiences at Harvard and Princeton Universities inspired her research. Hurtado has authored and co-authored empirical research about higher education, race, campus climate, and academic achievement.

Her work informs academic institutions about the experiences of minority and low-income students to improve their educational experiences. In a 1997 study, Hurtado found that within a sample of minority college students, hostile campus racial climates resulted in a decline in the sense of belongingness of the participants. To further highlight a need for institutional reform, her 2002 work "Diversity and higher education: Theory and impact on educational outcomes" encourages the practice of affirmative action and the promotion of racial diversity within higher education. Her 2019 article titled "Now Is the Time”: Civic Learning for a Strong Democracy was published within The Academy's open access journal, Daedalus.

== Representative publications ==
- Gurin, P., Dey, E., Hurtado, S., & Gurin, G. (2002). Diversity and higher education: Theory and impact on educational outcomes. Harvard Educational Review, 72(3), 330-367. https://doi.org/10.17763/haer.72.3.01151786u134n051
- Harper, S. R., & Hurtado, S. (2007). Nine themes in campus racial climates and implications for institutional transformation. New Directions for Student Services, 2007(120), 7-24. https://doi.org/10.1002/ss.254
- Hurtado, S. (1992). The campus racial climate: Contexts of conflict. The Journal of Higher Education, 63(5), 539-569. https://doi.org/10.1080/00221546.1992.11778388
- Hurtado, S., & Carter, D. F. (1997). Effects of college transition and perceptions of the campus racial climate on Latino college students' sense of belonging. Sociology of Education, 324-345. https://doi.org/10.2307/2673270
- Hurtado, S., Milem, J. F., Clayton-Pedersen, A. R., & Allen, W. R. (1998). Enhancing campus climates for racial/ethnic diversity: Educational policy and practice. The Review of Higher Education, 21(3), 279-302. https://dx.doi.org/10.1353/rhe.1998.0003

== Books ==
- Gurin, P., Lehman, J.S., Lewis, E., Dey, E.L., Hurtado, S., & Gunn, G. (2004). Defending diversity : affirmative action at the University of Michigan (1st ed.). University of Michigan Press. https://doi.org/10.3998/mpub.17844
- Hurtado, S., Milem, J., Clayton-Pedersen, A., & Allen, W. (1999). Enacting Diverse Learning Environments: Improving the Climate for Racial/Ethnic Diversity in Higher Education. ASHE-ERIC Higher Education Report, Vol. 26, No. 8. ERIC Clearinghouse on Higher Education, One Dupont Circle, NW, Suite 630, Washington, DC 20036-1181.
