= Sandi Peterson =

American businessperson and director

Sandra E. Peterson
- Born: 1959 (age 66–67)
- Other name: Sandi Peterson
- Education: Cornell University (BA); Princeton University (MPA)
- Occupation: Group worldwide chairman
- Employer: Clayton, Dubilier & Rice

Sandi Peterson (born 1959) is an American businesswoman. She is currently an Operating Partner at Clayton, Dubilier & Rice and serves on the Microsoft Board of Directors. She was group worldwide chairman at Johnson & Johnson between 2012 and 2018 and previously held leadership positions at Bayer Medical Care, Medco Health Solutions, Nabisco and Whirlpool Corporation.

== Early life and education ==
The youngest of six children, Peterson received her bachelor's degree in government studies from Cornell University, and her MPA in applied economics from Princeton University. She began her career working in consulting at McKinsey & Company.

== Business career ==
From 1987 to 1993, Peterson worked in strategy, finance, sustainability, and product development at Whirlpool Corporation, and later at Nabisco. In 2000, Peterson accepted a leadership position at Medco Health Solutions. In 2005, she became president of Bayer Medical Care. She also received a fellowship from the Robert Bosch Foundation in Stuttgart, Germany, and spent a year serving with the German Federal Ministry of Finance and the Federation of German Industries. In 2010, she was promoted to chairman and chief executive officer of Bayer CropScience AG.

Peterson was formerly the chair of the conservation research charity EcoHealth Alliance (previously called Wildlife Trust). and served on the board of directors at Dun & Bradstreet. In 2015 she joined the board of directors of Microsoft and is the lead independent director.

Peterson often advocates for women in business, and was featured in a multi-part series of interviews on the subject by Forbes in 2011. She is a trustee of the Institute for Advanced Study in Princeton, New Jersey.

=== Johnson & Johnson ===
In December 2012, Peterson accepted a position at Johnson & Johnson as group worldwide chairman, which made her the highest-ranking woman at the company. The Wall Street Journal reported that Johnson & Johnson had "wooed" Peterson during the hiring process for several months. Before Peterson was hired, the company had been reported as having difficulties with product recalls and declining sales. Peterson's hiring was part of a company-wide overhaul meant to address these issues. Peterson also joined the company's executive committee and relocated from Germany, where she had worked for Bayer, to New Brunswick, New Jersey, where Johnson & Johnson is headquartered.

On October 1, 2018, Peterson retired from Johnson & Johnson.

== Honors and awards ==
In 2013, the National Association for Female Executives gave Peterson their "woman of achievement" award. In 2014, Peterson received the Corporate Vision Award from Gilda's Club, New York City, a charity foundation supporting cancer victims and their families. That same year, Forbes ranked Peterson at number 20 on its list of the "most powerful women in business". In 2015, The Committee of 200 named Peterson the recipient of its annual "corporate innovator" award.

In June 2015, Peterson traveled to Berlin to give a presentation on healthcare policy to government leaders at the G7 summit.
