= Southron =

Southron is a term meaning "a person from the south". It was originally used by Scots to refer to the English, or by the people of Northern England to refer to the people of Southern England. Other notable uses are:

- A person from the Southern United States in general
  - Historically, a person from the Confederate States of America
- A member of the Haradrim, a human people in the fiction of J. R. R. Tolkien
- "At Lord's", a poem about cricket by Francis Thompson
