= William L. Brandon =

American medical doctor, politician and soldier

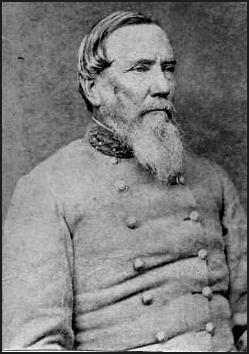
- Born: c. 1801–1802; Adams County, Mississippi, US
- Died: October 8, 1890; Wilkinson County, Mississippi, US
- Burial place: Arcole Plantation, Mississippi, US
- Military career
- Allegiance: Confederate States of America
- Branch: Mississippi Militia; Confederate States Army
- Service years: 1861–1864 (CSA)
- Rank: Major General (Militia); Brigadier General (CSA)
- Commands: 21st Mississippi Infantry Regiment; Mississippi Reserve Corps; Bureau of Conscription
- Conflicts: Mexican–American War; American Civil War: Battle of Malvern Hill; Battle of Gettysburg; Battle of Chickamauga

William Lindsay Brandon (born c. 1801–1802 in Adams County, Mississippi; died October 8, 1890, in Wilkinson County, Mississippi) was a medical doctor, state legislator, planter and military officer best known for having served as a general in the Confederate States Army during the American Civil War. Brandon was born c. 1801–1802, though his exact birthdate is indeterminate.

Brandon served with the Confederate States Army from 1861 until 1864. He fought in several major battles, such as the Battle of Malvern Hill, where he was greatly injured after a ball passed through his ankle. He also participated in the Yorktown siege of 1862, the Battle of Williamsburg and the campaigns of Chattanooga and Knoxville. Brandon was promoted to the rank of brigadier general in June 1864. From July 1864 until the end of the war, he served in such positions as the commander of the Reserve Corps of Mississippi and the head of the Confederate Bureau of Conscription.

In his postbellum life, he returned to his Wilkinson County plantation where he worked, despite physical injury and age, until his death on October 8, 1890. Upon his death, he was buried at his plantation.

== Early life and education ==
William Lindsay Brandon was born to Irishman Gerard Brandon, a veteran of the American Revolution, in either 1801 or 1802 in Adams County, Mississippi. Brandon's exact birth date cannot be determined as his family records were destroyed in an 1831 fire. He was the youngest brother of future Mississippi Governor Gerard C. Brandon. William settled in Wilkinson County, Mississippi near Pinckneyville in 1824. The following year, Brandon married Ann Davis. This union produced two children, however, both Davis and her children would soon die. Brandon was educated at Washington College (now Washington and Lee University) in Virginia, and the College of New Jersey (now Princeton University) where he studied medicine. In his antebellum career, he became a planter, highly interested in horses and hunting. In 1826, Brandon served in the Mississippi House of Representatives, around the same time that his brother Gerard Brandon was serving as the governor of Mississippi. In 1828, Brandon founded the Kelter Club, a gentlemen's club populated by propertied men from the Natchez area of Mississippi and from West Feliciana Parish in Louisiana. In 1833, Brandon married Ann Eliza Ratliff, having three sons, William, Lane William and Robert, all of whom later served in the Confederate States Army. A fourth son, Eugene, died at the age of two. Brandon enlisted for service in the Mexican–American War, and become a major general in the local militia. Because of his medicinal expertise, Brandon was consulted often by professionals in the field. When Brandon's wife died in 1840, he continued to take care of her plantation, as well as his own Arcole Plantation. By 1860, Brandon owned a considerable amount of property, including $14,000 in real estate and $64,000 in personal property, as well as 63 slaves and 16 slave quarters.

== Military career ==
Despite his age of 59 or 60 at the time, Brandon was permitted to serve with the Confederate States Army in 1861 as lieutenant colonel of the 21st Mississippi Infantry Regiment and went to Virginia. In July 1861, Brandon contracted a cold, prompting him to take a leave from active service until the end of August. His subordinates did not believe him fit for duty again and he did not receive an appointment to colonel. Brandon and his regiment were placed in the Confederate Army of the Potomac in Virginia. During the summer and fall of 1861, Brandon's unit was on duty in the northeastern part of the state. During the Yorktown siege, his regiment, along with other Confederate army units, were spread out across eastern Virginia between Culpeper, Fredericksburg, and Norfolk, forming the Warwick Line. Brandon's regiment would again see action in the Battle of Williamsburg, fought the day after the action at Yorktown.

During the Battle of Malvern Hill on 1 July 1862, Brandon's ankle joint was struck by a ball. As he fell, his hand hit a rolling shell which did not explode. Oblivious to his wounds, Brandon tried to rise again but he fell once more and remained on the field until men were able to pick him up and carry him to the rear. Because there was no visible bleeding, Brandon thought that his injuries were not serious but was taken on horse-back to a hospital. Initially, Brandon was offered whiskey which would have eased the pain, but he refused to drink it without water and sugar. He drank it only after being convinced it was necessary. Brandon's foot was removed after a torniquet was put in place. Brandon's arteries were then sewn in what was likely to be a very painful procedure, as there was not enough chloroform to produce a full anesthesia. To replace his amputated leg, his doctors gave him a wooden prosthetic leg. Because of Brandon's age, his doctors thought his chances of survival were slight. After coming to Richmond, he was tended to by friends and his servant. Confederate President Jefferson Davis even offered Brandon the hospitality of his mansion in the city.

Brandon later returned to active service, commanding his regiment through the Battle of Gettysburg. General William Barksdale was killed in the battle; Colonel Humphreys became brigadier general to replace him, and Brandon was in turn promoted to colonel. He went on to see action in the Chickamauga Campaign. In September 1863, after the Battle of Chickamauga, Brandon resigned from active duty. Because of his artificial leg, age and the recurrence of an ailment from 1862, he did not feel fit for military service at the time.

== Later life ==
In June 1864, Brandon was promoted to brigadier general and sent to Mississippi where, on 23 July, he was given command of the Reserve Corps of Mississippi. He was later placed in charge of the Confederate Bureau of Conscription on 8 October 1864, where he worked to recruit men for the Confederate army. After the war, Brandon returned to his Arcole Plantation in Wilkinson County, where despite his age and physical disability, he worked until his death on October 8, 1890. Brandon was buried at his plantation.

Brandon's son Lane William Brandon eventually graduated from Harvard University. In service to the Confederate States Army, Lane achieved the rank of captain. He fought in several major battles including Chickamauga and Malvern Hill, where both he and his father were wounded. William R. Brandon, a physician, was wounded in the Battle of Gettysburg. Robert L. Brandon went on to attend Yale University.

== See also ==
- List of American Civil War generals (Confederate)
