= Celeste Rohlfing =

American chemist

Celeste Rohlfing is a retired American chemist and the former chief operating officer at the American Association for the Advancement of Science (AAAS).

== Education and career ==
Rohlfing earned a Bachelor of Science degree in chemistry from Duke University and a Ph.D. in physical chemistry from Princeton University.

She spent most of her career at Los Alamos National Laboratory and Sandia National Laboratory. She later moved to the National Science Foundation, where she became the Deputy Assistant Director, overseeing research in the physical sciences and mathematics. During the Obama administration, she served as the Assistant Director for physical sciences. She then became the chief operating officer at the American Association for the Advancement of Science.

== Diversity and inclusion efforts ==
Rohlfing is an advocate for underrepresented minorities in science, with a particular emphasis on the importance of mentoring.
