= Nick Morgan =

American speaking coach and author (born 1953)

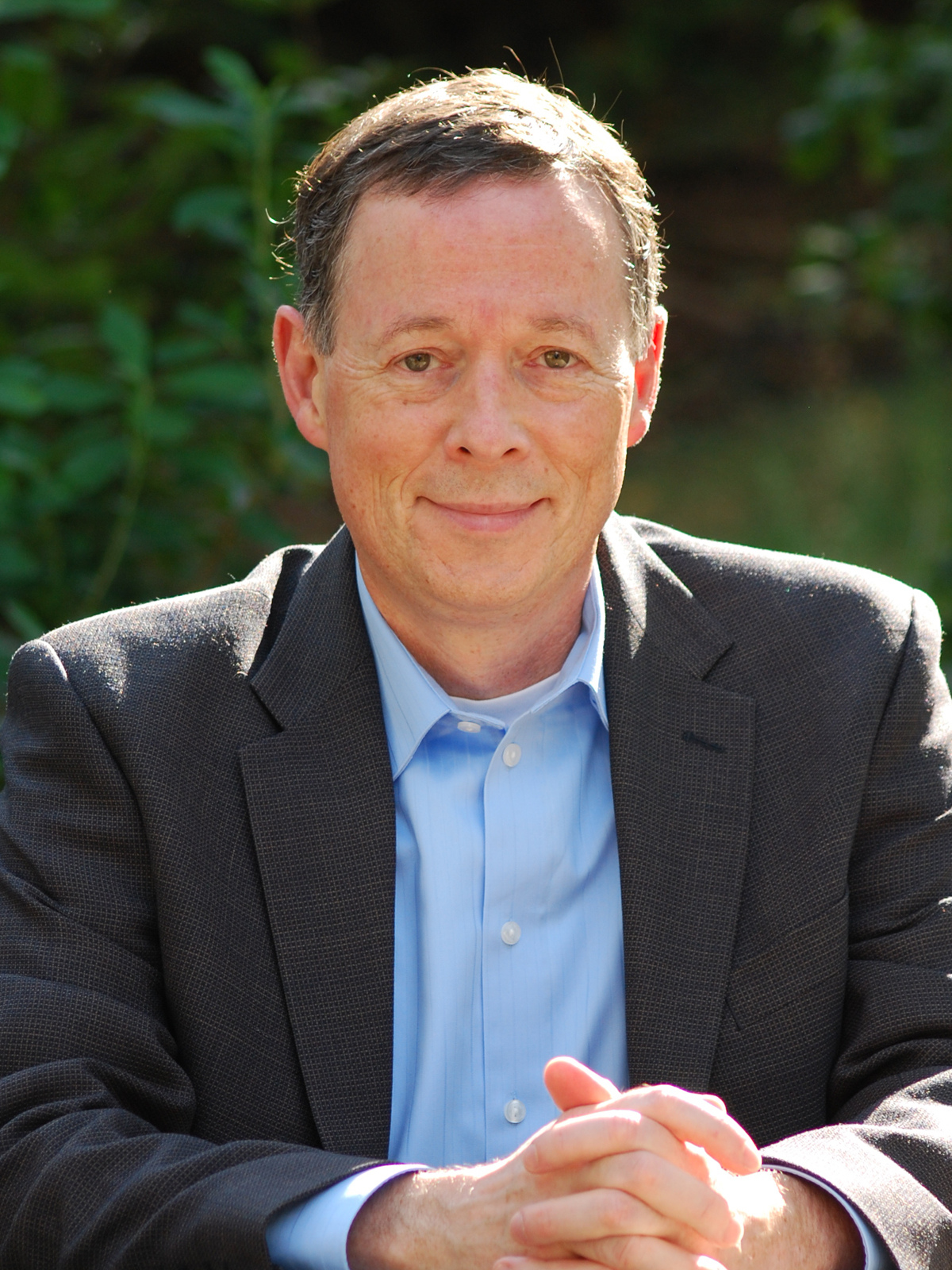
- Nick Morgan in 2012
- Born: 1953 (age 72–73)
- Education: University of Virginia; Princeton University
- Occupations: Speaking coach, author
- Children: Emma Wyatt, Sarah Morgan, Eric Morgan, Howard Morgan
- Website: publicwords.com

Nick Morgan (born Nicholas H. Morgan in 1953) is an American speaking coach and author.

Morgan received his A.B. in English from Princeton University in 1976 after completing a 140-page long senior thesis titled "The Artistry of Form: Dickens' Great Expectations and Our Mutual Friend." He earned his M.A. and Ph.D. in English literature and rhetoric at the University of Virginia in 1977 and 1981, respectively. He taught Shakespeare and Public Speaking at the University of Virginia and Princeton University. At University of Virginia, he also served as Assistant Vice President and Provost. He first started writing speeches for Virginia Governor Charles S. Robb and went on to found his own communications consulting organization, Public Words, in 1997.

Individual clients include former Yahoo! executive and author Tim Sanders, mountaineer Susan Ershler, Emmy Award-winning talk show host Montel Williams, reality TV star Les Gold (Hardcore Pawn), and online marketing strategist David Meerman Scott. Corporate clients include IBM, Kaiser Permanente, and Royal Dutch Shell.

He has written hundreds of articles for local and national publications, including Forbes. Harvard Business Review cited his article How to Become an Authentic Speaker as one of ten "must read" articles on communication.

Morgan is an expert in non-verbal communications skills for public speakers, and has coached and written extensively on this topic. His interest in body language was particularly fueled by three life events at age 17: "First, I read a book about the Dalai Lama ... Second, I learned my father was gay. And third, I died."

His expertise encompasses not only traditional in-person meetings and presentations, but also the increasingly common virtual-world meetings using teleconferencing.

He is frequently asked to critique speeches by celebrities such as the campaign speeches of Barack Obama and the first official speech of Catherine, Duchess of Cambridge.

As well as leading Public Words, he served as editor of the Harvard Management Communication Letter from 1998 to 2003. Morgan is a former Fellow at the Center for Public Leadership at Harvard’s Kennedy School of Government.

== Publications ==
Morgan authored books for Harvard Business Press including On running a meeting, and Working the Room: How to Move People to Action Through Audience-Centered Speaking, also published in paperback as Give Your Speech, Change the World: How To Move Your Audience to Action. In reviewing Working the Room, Publishers Weekly said "This is a clear, engaging guide any socially and verbally competent person can benefit from."

More recently he has published with John Wiley & Sons and New Word City. These more recent books include Trust Me: Four Steps to Authenticity and Charisma, 7 Steps to a Great Speech, How to Read Body Language, The King’s Speech, How to Tell Great Business Stories, and How to Give a Great Presentation. On adopting the methods in Trust Me, Microsoft executive Curtis Frye claimed "...you will communicate more openly, authentically, and charismatically."

In 2012, two expert public speakers (Bruce Gabrielle and Gonzalo Alvarez) interviewed five of their colleagues on the question "What do the top presentation experts in the world read?" Of 35 books shortlisted, Morgan's book Give Your Speech, Change the World came 1st in the "Delivery" category, 2nd in the "Content" category, and 4th overall.

Morgans most recent book, Can You Hear Me?: How to Connect with People in a Virtual World (2018) is a Washington Post Non-Fiction Best Seller.

Harvard Business Review Press published Morgan's book Power Cues: The Subtle Science of Leading Groups, Persuading Others, and Maximizing Your Personal Impact on May 13, 2014.

Morgan is also the author of a book on Charles Dickens, a screenplay, and five theatrical plays.

In addition, he occasionally comments on the state of the publishing industry and its transition from print to the digital era.
