= Senseless (2008 film) =

Senseless is a 2008 film based on Stona Fitch's 2001 novel of the same name, starring Jason Behr and Emma Catherwood, and directed by Symon Hynd.
