= Jason W. Fleischer =

American electrical engineer

Jason W. Fleischer is an American electrical engineer, an associate professor of electrical engineering at Princeton University. Fleischer received his Ph.D. in 1999, from the University of California, San Diego. His research is in the area of nonlinear optics, including the use of light to model superfluids and the recovery of images from scenes obscured by translucent materials. In 2007, a team of researchers led by him noted that light waves passing through nonlinear crystals and superfluids have comparable qualities: The collective motion of superfluid particles looks like the coherent waves in laser light. In the January issue of Nature Physics, his team reported that this well-known, but little appreciated, similarity allowed easier and improved observations of superfluid-like and related dispersive phenomena.
