= Dennis Crouch =

American legal scholar

Dennis David Crouch (born April 30, 1975 in Columbia, South Carolina) is an American patent attorney who worked for McDonnell Boehnen Hulbert & Berghoff LLP (MBHB) in Chicago, Illinois, until 2007. In 2007, he accepted a post of associate professor at the University of Missouri School of Law in Columbia, Missouri.

Crouch graduated with a B.S.E. in mechanical and aerospace engineering a certificate in engineering management systems from Princeton University in 1997. Along with Kotaro Akita, he completed a senior thesis, titled "webrisk!: An Autonomous Learning System on the Internet", under the supervision of Minh Quang Phan. In 2003, he received his J.D. from the University of Chicago Law School, and passed the Illinois bar examination and was admitted to practice in Illinois in the same year. He also passed the USPTO registration examination, most likely in 2003, and was registered to practice as a patent agent in February 2004 and as a patent attorney in August 2004.

== Patently-O ==
Crouch runs the "Patently-O Patent Blog", a patent law blog that features analysis on current Federal Circuit law and other subjects. According to BusinessWeek, as of 2008 the Patently-O blog was the most widely read patent law blog, and was included in the American Bar Association Journal blog's inaugural patent blog "hall of fame" in 2012. Crouch is reported to be "fairly obsessive about timeliness, checking the Federal Circuit's site when it is updated each morning and immediately noting new cases on his blog."
