= Leslie Vivian =

American academic administrator (1919–1995)

- Born: Leslie Langdon Vivian Jr. March 24, 1919
- Died: October 18, 1995 (aged 76); Vineyard Haven, Massachusetts
- Spouse: Anita "Tita" Willis Vivian
- Military career
- Allegiance: United States of America
- Branch: United States Army
- Service years: 1941–1946
- Rank: Major
- Nickname: Bud Vivian
- Commands: 13th Armored Division
- Conflicts: World War II
- Awards: Bronze Star; Army Commendation Medal
- Other work: Lifelong employee of Princeton University

Leslie Langdon "Bud" Vivian Jr., March 24, 1919 – October 18, 1995) was an American academic administrator. A lifelong employee at Princeton University, Vivian retired in 1986 after a 37-year administrative career which ended with 16 years as the Director of Community and Regional Affairs. After his death in 1995, classmates from the Princeton University Class of 1942 set up an annual award to honor his service to the community: The Leslie “Bud” Vivian Award for Community Service.

== Personal life ==
Born on March 24, 1919, Vivian was raised in Plainfield, New Jersey and went to preparatory school at Hotchkiss. After Hotchkiss, Bud attended Princeton University, where he served in student government, eventually becoming class vice President of the Princeton University Class of 1942. Vivian graduated with an A.B. in philosophy from Princeton in 1942 after completing a senior thesis titled "An Analysis of the Challenge of Totalitarianism." While at Princeton, Vivian also served as secretary and president of Cap and Gown Club.

He married Anita (Tita) Willis before he was deployed for service in Europe during World War II. Their first child Leslie was born in 1944, followed by daughters Elinor (Lea), Ann and Mary.

In addition to his career at Princeton University, Mr. Vivian was a civic presence applying himself to many causes, including Princeton Community Housing Inc., the Mercer County Heart Fund, the Arts Council of Princeton, the Boy Scouts and the Medical Center at Princeton. In 1993, Vivian wrote the introduction to William K. Evans’ book: “Princeton: A Picture Postcard History of Princeton and Princeton University.”

Vivan continued his community activities after leaving Princeton and moving to Martha's Vineyard. He died on October 18, 1995, at his home in Vineyard Haven from prostate cancer.

== Military service ==
Vivian received his ROTC commission during his commencement ceremonies. After training at Fort Bragg, NC, Fort Sill, OK, and Camp Beale, TX; Vivian was assigned to the 305th Field Artillery Battalion. He traveled from Texas to France with the 13th Armored Division, Third Army, to fight in the final push into Germany. During WWII, Vivian served in the 13th Armored Division and was awarded the Bronze Star and the Army Commendation Medal. He later attained the rank of major.

== University career ==
After the war, Vivian returned to Princeton to work at Princeton University. Vivian joined the university administration in 1948, serving in a number of positions during his career including: administrative officer for Project Squid; assistant to the chair of the physics department; assistant executive officer of the Committee on Project Research and Inventions; and associate director of the Office of Research and Project Administration. By 1954, he was working as an administrative assistant for Allen Shenstone in the Physics department. In 1967 Vivian was named executive director of university relations, reporting to the president on coordinating all fund-raising activities, alumni affairs, and public relations, including community relations. In 1970 Vivian was hired for the newly created post of Director of Community and Regional Affairs, where he served for 16 years. Under Vivian's leadership, the university made the symbolic gesture of keeping the FitzRandolph Gates permanently open.

Vivian worked for Princeton for 37 years, serving as an ambassador representing the university in the community. When he retired in 1986, Vivian held the post of Director, Community and Regional Affairs; as well as, Associate Secretary of Princeton University.

== Leslie “Bud” Vivian Memorial Fund ==
The Leslie “Bud” Vivian Memorial Fund at the Princeton Area Community Foundation was established after Bud's death in 1995. His classmates from the Princeton University Class of 1942, together with sixteen Princeton-area organizations, established the Fund to honor their friend and classmate. The goal of the funds set aside are to "promote in perpetuity the principles by which Bud lived, and to recognize the important contributions he made to the entire Princeton community. Bud Vivian served as Princeton University's Director of Community and Regional Affairs for many years and his concern for his neighbors extended into all corners of the town."

The memorial fund created the Leslie “Bud” Vivian Award for Community Service, an annual award given to a member of the community who has shown longstanding interest in making positive contributions to the Princeton community.
