= Stona Fitch =

American novelist

- Education: Princeton University (AB)
- Occupation: Novelist
- Website: stonafitch.squarespace.com

Stona Fitch is an American novelist, best known for his 2001 book, Senseless, which was turned into the 2008 movie, Senseless, directed by Symon Hynd. Fitch graduated with an A.B. in English from Princeton University in 1983 after completing an 137-page-long senior thesis titled "Luxury You Can Afford - Ten Stories."

== Bibliography ==
- Give and Take (2010) - the first book published by Concord Free Press.
- Printer's Devil (2009, Free Raven Press).
- Senseless (2001, SoHo Press) - cinematized as Senseless (2008 film).
- Strategies for Success (1992, G.B. Putnam's Sons).
