= Jonathan Losos =

American evolutionary biologist

Jonathan B. Losos (born December 7, 1961) is an American evolutionary biologist, and herpetologist.

== Life ==
Born in St. Louis County, Missouri, Losos studied biology at Harvard University, from which he received a bachelor's degree in 1984. Later on, in 1989, he received a PhD in Zoology from the University of California, Berkeley (Ecomorphological Adaptation in the Genus Anolis). Starting in 1987, he worked as a teaching assistant in Berkeley. After receiving his PhD, he moved to the University of California, Davis in 1990 to become one of the inaugural postdoctoral fellows at the Center for Population Biology. Losos then, from 1992 on, was assistant professor at Washington University in St. Louis, and then was promoted to the rank of associate professor in 1997 and professor in 2001.

His work focuses on a wide range of topics, but he is best known for his studies of convergent evolution and adaptive radiation, and for experimental studies of evolution in nature. Most of his empirical work has involved the evolutionary radiation of lizards in the genus Anolis which occur in Central and South America and on islands in the Caribbean. More recently, he has also begun to study the evolution and ecology of domestic cats.

From 2000 to 2003 and 2004–2005, Losos was director of Tyson Research Center at Washington University in St. Louis. In 2006, Losos left Washington University to become the Monique and Philip Lehner Professor for the Study of Latin America at Harvard University and Professor in the Department of Organismic and Evolutionary Biology, as well as Curator in Herpetology of the Museum of Comparative Zoology. Losos then returned to Washington University in St. Louis College of Arts and Sciences in 2018 to become the William H. Danforth Distinguished University Professor in the Department of Biology, as well as the founding director of the Living Earth Collaborative, a biodiversity partnership between Washington University in St. Louis, the Missouri Botanical Garden and the Saint Louis Zoo.

== Honors and awards ==
Losos has received a number of awards, including the Dobzhansky Prize in 1991, the David Starr Jordan Prize in 1998, the Edward O. Wilson Naturalist Award in 2009, the Daniel Giraud Elliot Medal in 2012, the Sewall Wright Award in 2019, and the Friend of Darwin Award in 2024.

Losos is a Fellow of the American Association for the Advancement of Science (2005) and the American Academy of Arts and Sciences (2012) and is a member of the National Academy of Sciences (2018) and the American Philosophical Society (2024). In 2016, he received the Distinguished Herpetologist award of The Herpetologists' League.

== Works ==
=== As author ===
- Lizards in an Evolutionary Tree: Ecology and Adaptive Radiation of Anoles. University of California Press. 2011. ISBN 9780520269842.
- Improbable Destinies: Fate, Chance, and the Future of Evolution. Riverhead Press: Penguin. 2017. ISBN 9780525534136.
- The Cat's Meow: How Cats Evolved from the Savanna to Your Sofa. Viking Press: Penguin. 2023. ISBN 9781984878700.
- T. Flach and J.B. Losos. Feline. Abrams. 2025. ISBN 9781419773648.

=== As editor ===
- Losos, Jonathan B.; Ricklefs, Robert E., eds. (2009). The Theory of Island Biogeography Revisited. Princeton University Press. ISBN 9781400831920.
- In the Light of Evolution: Essays from the Laboratory and Field. W.H. Freeman. 2011. ISBN 9780981519494.
- Losos, Jonathan B.; Baum, David A.; Futuyma, Douglas J.; Hoekstra, Hopi E.; Lenski, Richard E.; Moore, Allen J.; Peichel, Catherine L.; Schluter, Dolph; Whitlock, Michael C., eds. (2013). The Princeton Guide to Evolution. Princeton University Press. ISBN 9781400848065.
- Losos, Jonathan B.; Lenski, Richard E., eds. (2016). How Evolution Shapes Our Lives: Essays on Biology and Society. Princeton University Press. ISBN 9780691170398.
