= Trustees of Princeton University =

Board that manages Princeton University

The Trustees of Princeton University is a 40-member board responsible for managing Princeton University's $37.6 billion endowment (2025), real estate, instructional programs, and admission. The Trustees include at least 13 members elected by alumni classes, and the governor of New Jersey and the president of the university as ex officio members.

The Trustees' mission and responsibilities stem from the original charter of the college, written in 1746. The Trustees oversee the budget of the university through the Princeton University Investment Company (PRINCO). Notable recent policy decisions include implementing the residential college system, accepting coeducation, and increasing the size of the undergraduate student body.

Unlike most other governing boards of universities, the Trustees of Princeton University is chartered as a 40-member corporation in its own right that has the authority to establish and govern Princeton University and to grant degrees in the same. This is similar to most of the oldest universities and colleges in the United States (including all of the Ivy League universities except for Cornell University), such as the President and Fellows of Harvard College and the Yale Corporation.

== Current Trustees ==
Officers of the Board

- Christopher L. Eisgruber '83, President of the university
- Louise S. Sams '79, chair of the Board
- José B. Alvarez '85, Vice Chair of the Board
- Lori D. Fouché '91, Clerk of the Board
- Hilary A. Parker '01, Secretary of the University

Ex officio

- Christopher L. Eisgruber — President of the University
- Mikie Sherrill — Governor of New Jersey

Members of the Board

| Kamil Ali-Jackson | Independent director and life sciences entrepreneur and co-founder | Class of 1981 |
| José B. Alvarez | Clinical Professor of Business Administration, Tuck School of Business, Dartmouth | Class of 1985 |
| Joshua B. Bolten | CEO, Business Roundtable | Class of 1976 |
| Sarah Marie Bruno | Program Officer in Mathematical and Physical Sciences, John Templeton Foundation | Class of 2021 |
| Aisha F. Chebbi | M.D. Candidate, Northwestern University's Feinberg School of Medicine | Class of 2024 |
| Ann Chen | Retired Partner, Bain & Company | Class of 1989 |
| Beth F. Cobert | President, Affiliates and Strategic Partnerships, Strada Educational Foundation | Class of 1980 |
| Blair W. Effron | Co-founder and Partner, Centerview Partners, Investment Banking | Class of 1984 |
| Edward h. Felsenthal | Senior Advisor, Office of the CEO, Salesforce; Executive Chair, TIME | Class of 1988 |
| Andrew C. Florance | Founder and CEO, CoStar Group | Class of 1986 |
| Lori D. Fouché | Managing Partner, LAD Ventures LLC | Class of 1991 |
| Yolandra Gomez | Pediatric Health Consultant, Jicarilla Apache Nation | Class of 1988 |
| Naomi I. Hess | Editorial Manager, American Association of People with Disabilities; Graduate Student, Northeastern University | Class of 2022 |
| Robert J. Hugin | Retired Chairman and CEO, Celgene Corporation | Clas of 1976 |
| Yan Huo | Managing Partner & Chief Investment Officer, Capula Investment Management LLP | Class of 1994 |
| Kimberly H. Johnson | Board Member, Eli Lilly | Class of 1995 |
| Gil S. Joseph | Graduate Student, Stanford University, Knight-Hennessy Scholar | Class of 2025 |
| Anthony P. Lee | Managing Director, Altos Ventures | Class of 1992 |
| Nandi O. Leslie | Principal Technical Fellow, RTX | Class of 2005 |
| Robert E. Long | Retired Research and Development Leader in Consumer Products | Class of 1979 |
| Paul A. Maeder | Chair and Founder, Highland Capital Partners | Class of 1975 |
| Mutemwa R. Masheke | Product Manager, Microsoft | Class of 2023 |
| Bob Peck | Managing Director, FPR Partners | Class of 1988 P20 |
| Carol Quillen | President and CEO, National Trust for Historic Preservation | Class of 1991 |
| Gordon P. Ritter | Founder and General Partner, Emergence Capital | Class of 1986 |
| Anthony D. Romero | Executive Director, American Civil Liberties Union | Class of 1987 |
| Louise S. Sams | Retired Executive VP & General Counsel, Turner Broadcasting System, Inc. | Class of 1979 |
| Bradford L. Smith | Vice Chair and President, Microsoft Corporation | Class of 1981 |
| Anthony D. So | Distinguished Professor of the Practice and Director, Innovation+Design Enabling Access (IDEA) Initiative, Johns Hopkins Bloomberg School of Public Health | Class of 1986 |
| Sarah E. Stein | Executive Managing Director, Pathstone | Class of 1997 |
| Marcho A. Tablada | International Arbitration Legal Assistant, White and Case LLP | Class of 1993 |
| Melissa H. Wu | CEO, Education Pioneers | Class of 1999 |
| Jackie Y. Ying | Chief Innovation and Research Officer, King Faisal Specialist Hospital & Research Centre, Saudi Arabia | Class of 1991 |
| Anthony A. Yoseloff | Managing Partner, Davidson Kempner Capital Management LP{ | Class of 1996 |

== See also ==
- President and Fellows of Harvard College
- Yale Corporation
- Trustees of Columbia University in the City of New York
- Board of Trustees of Dartmouth College
