= Tiger Inn =

Eating club at Princeton University

- U.S. Historic district – Contributing property
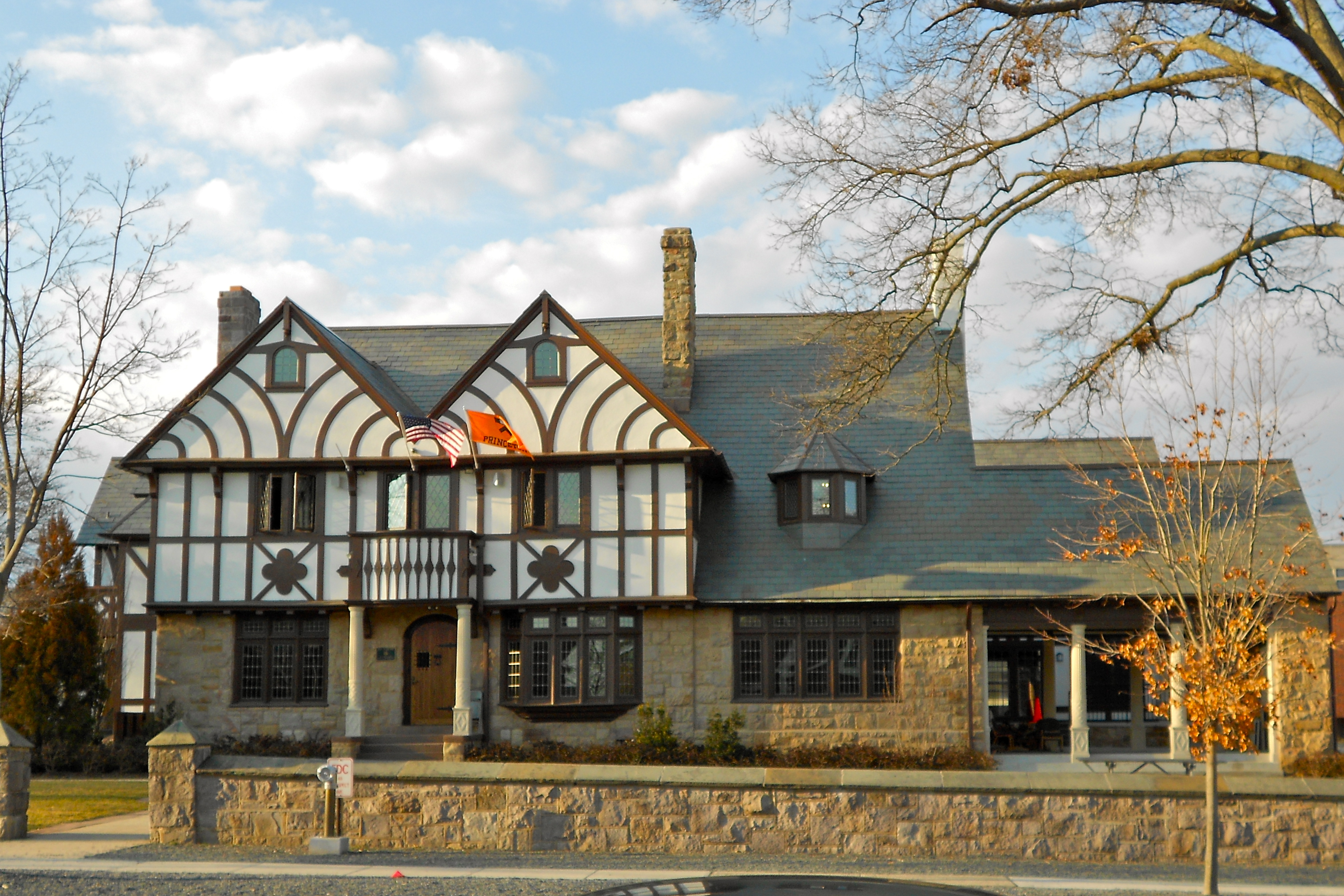

- Location within Mercer County, New Jersey Location within New Jersey Location within the United States
- Location: 48 Prospect Ave, Princeton, New Jersey
- Coordinates: 40°20′56.2″N 74°39′08.2″W
- Built: 1895
- Architect: G. Howard Chamberlin
- Architectural style: Tudor revival
- Part of: Princeton Historic District (ID75001143)
- Added to NRHP: 27 June 1975

Tiger Inn (or "T.I." as it is colloquially known) is one of the eleven active eating clubs at Princeton University in Princeton, New Jersey. Tiger Inn was founded in 1890 and is one of the "Big Four" eating clubs at Princeton (the others are The Ivy Club, University Cottage Club, and Cap and Gown Club), the four oldest and most prestigious on campus. Its historic clubhouse is located at 48 Prospect Avenue, near the Princeton University campus. Members of "T.I." also frequently refer to the club as "The Glorious Tiger Inn."

== The Tiger Inn clubhouse ==
The Tiger Inn clubhouse is the oldest of the Princeton eating club buildings, built in 1895 for an original club membership of 30 undergraduates, and has been in continuous use since the facility first opened. It is built in the Tudor "timbered style of the 15th century and modeled especially after an old inn in Chelsea." The architect for the clubhouse's original plan was G. Howard Chamberlain. According to The Tiger Inn's official history, "Princeton myth [also] credits [the original plans for the clubhouse] to Howard Crosby Butler, Class of 1892 (a [Charter] member of Tiger Inn and Princeton's first Professor of architectural history)."

The clubhouse's central hall was filled with massive antique furniture presented to the club by Alice Dickerson Whitridge (1851–1920), "the widow of a Princeton trustee [Thomas Harrison Garrett] and mother of three of Princeton's most prominent graduates of the 1890s": Robert Garrett, John W. Garrett, and ???; these furnishings remain in use to this day. The funding for the original clubhouse, the land, and the club's other furnishings were provided by the club's membership, although all at the time recognized the support and contributions of the Garrett family.

Between 1922 and 1923 a room was added to the left of the front door and the second floor was remodeled; the second floor alterations were never used for their intended purpose, as members quickly converted the new portion of the second floor space to a card room. In the fall of 1926, the clubhouse was substantially improved; during the six weeks of these alterations club members were required to take their meals at the surrounding clubs. By 1928, the kitchen had been moved to the south of the building. The changes to the clubhouse from 1926 to 1928 were well-timed, as this coincided with an expansion of the membership. The financing of the renovations placed Tiger Inn on the firm financial footing it would need to survive the Great Depression.

The distinctive clubhouse has recently undergone renovations, improvements and enlargements as part of its “21st Century Expansion and Renovation Project,” for which the commissioned architect was Connolly Architecture, Inc. The project was completed with the formal dedication of the new club facilities on the weekend of November 11, 2011. Funded entirely by the club's alumni, the expanded facilities include a new dining hall and improvements to the spaces normally reserved for social events. The new facilities provide a more suitable building to serve the club's active membership, now up from 26 to over 150 in any given year, and club alumni exceeding 2,000 in 2012. Fundraising for the completed project continues.

== Membership ==
Tiger Inn is a selective club, meaning membership is awarded after successful completion of a process called bicker. During bicker, prospective members interact with current members, who then convene to vote on whether the prospective members should "receive a bid," or be invited to join the club.

The club has designated its 26 original founding members as "Charter Members." At the time of the club's founding, these members were known within the Princeton University community as "The Sour Balls." The active membership is that portion of membership that uses the clubhouse on a daily basis and is composed principally of Princeton undergraduates, although graduate students have also been active members from time to time. The club also has two honorific categories of membership to recognize and honor those who have had a positive and notable association with the club, whether as members of the Princeton University community or as individuals whose principal affiliation with the Princeton community is their association with Tiger Inn.

Tiger Inn's membership was once described by F. Scott Fitzgerald in This Side of Paradise (1920) as "broad-shouldered and athletic, vitalized by an honest elaboration of prep-school standards." In a 1927 essay on Princeton for the magazine College Humor, Fitzgerald elaborated: "Tiger Inn cultivates a bluff simplicity. Its membership is largely athletic and while it pretends to disdain social qualifications it has a sharp exclusiveness of its own."

Fitzgerald's comments were written during his time at Princeton University, when the membership of each of the eating clubs was male only. Women were not accepted as undergraduates at Princeton until 1969. Debate over co-ed eating club membership abounded from 1969 until 1991. In 1979, undergraduate Sally Frank filed suit against then all-male Ivy Club, Cottage Club, and Tiger Inn for gender discrimination. While Cottage chose to coeducate during the intervening years, Ivy Club and Tiger Inn were forced to become co-ed organizations in 1991, after their appeal to the U.S. Supreme Court regarding Frank's lawsuit was denied. The New Jersey Supreme Court had ruled in Frank v. Ivy Club that the failure to open membership to women violated the state's anti-discrimination statute.

In modern times, the membership of Tiger Inn is mixed-gender; the club's membership and leadership, including members of both its Graduate Council and the undergraduate officers have included many notable Princeton alumnae. In 2015, Grace Larsen was elected as the club's first female president. That same year, Maria Yu was elected as treasurer, and Victoria Hammarskjold was elected as communication chair, thus making it the first time the club's undergraduate officers were gender-balanced with three women and three men.

The full membership of the club, including all living alumni, have met four times to commemorate anniversaries of Tiger Inn. The highlight of the club's fiftieth anniversary celebration was the publication of the club's first official history, written by Charlie Mulduar and released in March 1940, just before America's involvement in World War II. The club's seventy-fifth anniversary was held on December 9, 1965, at the Hotel Roosevelt in New York. The celebrations for the 100th anniversary of the club began in 1988 with a small informal meeting of 40 alumni at the Princeton Club of New York who began to plan the centennial celebrations. The centennial celebrations peaked with the club's Hundredth Anniversary Dinner held on October 20, 1990, at the Hyatt in Princeton, following which many of the alumni insisted on continuing celebrations at the clubhouse. The centennial celebrations were concluded by the subsequent publication of the second club history entitled The Tiger Inn of Princeton, New Jersey, 1890–1997. In February 2016, The Tiger Inn marked its 125th anniversary with a dinner held at the Westin in Princeton, followed by continued celebrations at the clubhouse.

=== Notable contributions to sport ===
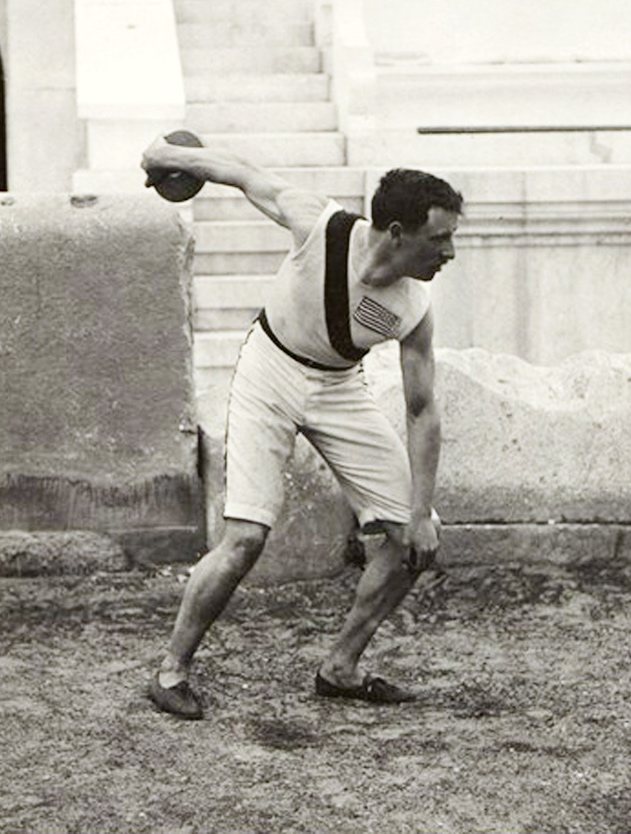
Garrett wins Gold in Athens, 1896

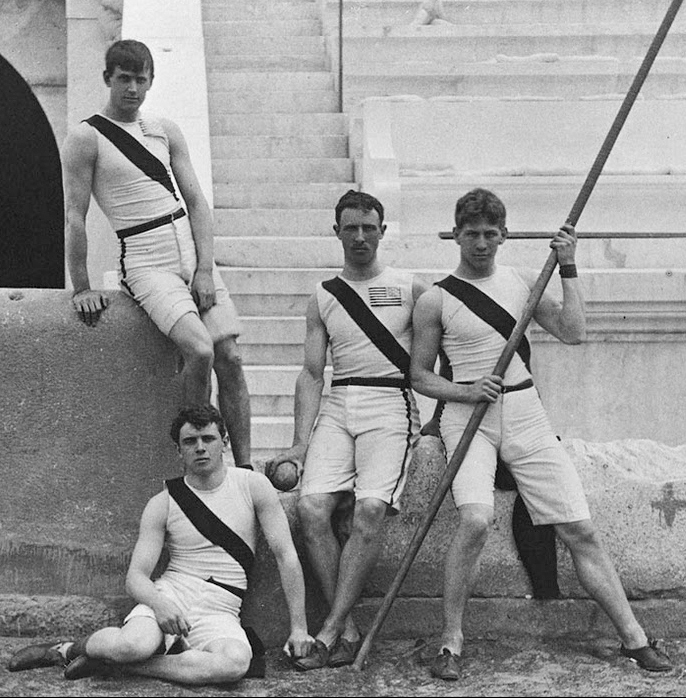
The Four Princeton Members of the First American Olympic Team, Athens 1896

==== Olympic athletes ====
Tiger Inn members acted to form the first American Olympics team for the first modern Olympic games in Athens in 1896. Most of the first American Olympic team came from Princeton, Harvard University and the Boston Athletic Association. Four Princetonians, including three Tiger Inn members, participated in those games. The TI members earned six medals in total: two gold, three silver medals, and one bronze; the four Princetonians earned 7 medals in total. The three TI members were Robert Garrett, Herb Jamison and Frank Lane; they were joined by Princetonian Al Tyler, who also medalled. These four Princeton athletes' 7 medals helped the 1896 American Olympic team earn 20 medals in total. Team Member Garrett delivered the most unexpected upset of the 1896 Games when he won gold in the discus throw, outperforming his Greek rival to win the most symbolic sport carried over from the ancient Olympics to the modern Olympic games.

TI members continued to participate in the Olympics after the 1896 Athens games. Garrett returned to the Olympics for the 1900 Paris games where he won two bronze medals. He was joined in the Paris games by John Cregan, who won a silver medal in the 800 meters. John DeWitt competed in the 1904 St. Louis games; he was joined there by A. M. Woods, who earned a silver medal. Pete Raymond rowed in both the 1968 Mexico City and 1972 Munich games; he earned a silver medal in Munich.

Most recently in 2024, Maia Mei Weintraub competed in the women's team foil fencing event for Team USA, where she carried her team to a gold medal. The victory marked the first time that the United States has taken gold in a team fencing event.

Tiger Inn members have earned more than 12 Olympic medals. Garrett's lifetime record of six Olympic medals among Princeton athletes continues to stand.

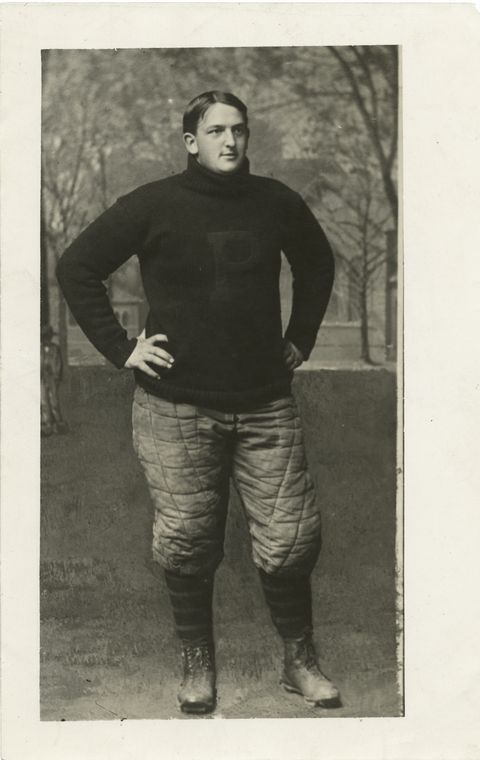
"Big Bill" Edwards

==== American football ====
Tiger Inn members have been both Princeton football players and professional football players. The College Football Hall of Fame lists many TI members in its ranks.

Tiger Inn alumni have returned to Princeton to serve as head coaches of Princeton's football program. As college football head coaches, Tiger Inn alumni through the class of 1900 compiled composite career coaching records of 175–31–5. They coached Princeton to at least one national championship. TI members who served as head coach include Garrett Cochran, Arthur Hillebrand and Robert Casciola. TI members have also served as head coaches of football teams at the U.S. Naval Academy, the University of California, Berkeley, Bowdoin College, Georgetown University, and the University of Nebraska-Lincoln, among other institutions.

Charlie Gogolak and Cosmo Iacavazzi are two prominent TI members who became professional football players.

==== Other American collegiate sports ====
Over its history, membership has included large contingents from most of the university's varsity teams, including captains from men's and women's lightweight and open crew, cross country, track and field, lacrosse, rugby, soccer, squash, swimming and diving, water polo, baseball, and wrestling.

Several of these individuals and their teams won National Championships:

- Men's Lacrosse
- Women's Lacrosse
- Men's Lightweight Crew
- Men's Squash
- Women's Squash

TI alumni Yasser El Halaby (squash), Jesse Hubbard (lacrosse), Cosmo Iacavazzi (football), and Theresa Sherry (lacrosse and soccer) are listed as among the greatest athletes in Princeton University history by the Daily Princetonian or Princeton Alumni Weekly. Jon Hess, Jesse Hubbard, and Chris Massey formed what many people believe to be the greatest attack unit ever in men's college lacrosse, winning three consecutive NCAA Championships.

Tiger Inn has also fielded teams that won several intramural sports championships.

=== Notable community contributions ===
==== Academia ====
Michael Spence won the 2001 Nobel Prize in Economics together with George Akerlof and Joseph Stiglitz. Spence has served as dean of the Stanford Graduate School of Business and as chairman of the Commission for Growth and Development. In addition to Spence, Tiger Inn has produced well over 100 members of Phi Beta Kappa. Its members have earned at least three Rhodes and two Marshall Scholarships.

The Princeton University School of Architecture was founded in 1919 through the efforts of Tiger Inn charter member Howard Clark Butler and his fellow faculty members. He became the School of Architecture's director in 1920. Professor Butler was only the second Princeton professor to offer a course related to architecture, following professor Alan Marquand.

Tiger Inn alumni have served many universities, including Princeton, as faculty members and as non-faculty instructors and administrators. These alumni include philologist W. K. Prentice and classicist John Fine on the faculty of Princeton; Chauncey Loomis, a Dartmouth College professor who led five Arctic expeditions; James Harland, a professor of classics at the University of North Carolina at Chapel Hill; Richard H. Williams, a professor of history at Southern Methodist University; Samuel Armistead, a professor of Spanish language and literature at the University of California, Davis; and Sean Smith, a professor of computer science at Dartmouth.

==== Cultural contributions ====
Tiger Inn's members have been active in literature and the arts. Jesse Lynch Williams won the first Pulitzer Prize for Drama in 1918 for Why Marry? William Edwards' book Football Days is an account of American football in the 19th century. Classics professor John Fine wrote several books, including The Ancient Greeks: A Critical History. Samuel Armistead wrote Spanish Tradition in Louisiana, which remains the definitive study on the use of the Spanish language in that state. H. K. Twichell wrote Regeneration in the Ruhr: The Unknown Story of a Decisive Answer to Communism in Postwar Europe. Henry Owsley is co-author of Distressed Investment Banking: To the Abyss and Back.

Frank Taplin was president of the Metropolitan Opera in New York, the Cleveland Orchestra, and the Cleveland Institute of Music. Thomas Hoving was the director of New York's Metropolitan Museum of Art from 1967 to 1977. Barry S. Friedberg is the chairman emeritus of the New York City Ballet.

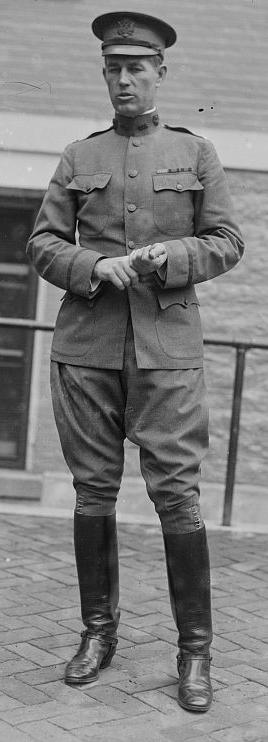
Medal of Honor recipient Johnston

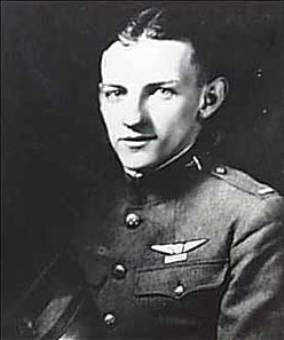
"Ace" Vaughn: WWI Flying Ace

==== Military ====
Several members of the Tiger Inn have served the United States as uniformed officers of its Armed Forces. TI was founded just over 20 years after the end of the Civil War. TI members have served in the Spanish-American War, World War I, World War II, the Korean War, the Vietnam War, the Gulf War, the Iraq War, and the War in Afghanistan, among other armed conflicts.

TI Members who served in World War I include Brigadier General Richard Coulter Jr., Medal of Honor recipient Gordon Johnston, and decorated World War I flying ace, "Ace" Vaughn.

Tiger Inn lists well over 30 members who gave their lives in the service of their country. The memory of many of these TI alums are honored through their portraits kept at the clubhouse, mainly in the upstairs library.

==== Elected and appointed offices ====
TI members have also held office in the United States at the federal, state and local levels, including as Senator, United States Ambassador, Speaker of the General Assembly of New Jersey, and Deputy Mayor of New York City. Senator John Danforth ranks as the senior-most elected politician to have been an active member of the club while a Princeton undergraduate. United States President Grover Cleveland accepted an honorary membership in Tiger Inn, making him the senior-most elected politician to have joined the club in this membership category.

==== Commerce ====
Arthur M. Wood was chairman and CEO of Sears and credited with its turnaround in the 1960s. He was also responsible for the building of Sears Tower in Chicago, whose last steel beam bears his signature. George H. Love led the reorganizations and turnarounds at two major corporations, the Consolidation Coal Company and the Chrysler Corporation, where he was chairman. Barry S. Friedberg served as head of investment banking at Merrill Lynch before its merger with Bank of America; under his leadership, Merrill Lynch climbed to the top of the industry league tables in every category he managed.

Rudolph Jay Schaefer ran his family's Brooklyn brewery, the F. & M. Schaefer Brewing Company of Brooklyn, New York. His product, Schaefer Beer, was the world's best selling beer until the mid-1970s.

Robert Hugin is chairman and president of Celgene, the New Jersey pharmaceutical company. Michael Novogratz was president of the Fortress Investment Group.

N. J. Nicholas Jr. was president of HBO in its earliest days, president of Time Inc in 1986, and co-CEO of Time Warner in 1990. He served the George H. W. Bush administration on the Presidential Commission on Environmental Quality and on the advisory board to the U.S. Trade Representative. After retiring from Time Warner in 1992, he served for 15 years as a trustee of the Environmental Defense Fund, including seven years as board chair. He also served as advisory board chair of the Columbia University Graduate School of Journalism.

== Notable members ==
- James T. Aubrey - television and film executive
- Ralph Bard - Under Secretary of the Navy and Assistant Secretary of the Navy during World War II, Roosevelt Administration
- Dan M. Berkovitz - General Counsel of the Commodity Futures Trading Commission, Obama Administration
- Walter C. Booth - known as "Bummy," an American football coach serving as the head football coach at the University of Nebraska–Lincoln (the Cornhuskers), compiling a career record of 46–8–1.
- Howard Crosby Butler - Charter Member, one of the founders of Princeton's School of Architecture, and its director from 1920
- Robert Casciola - head football coach at Princeton from 1973 to 1977.
- Grover Cleveland - Honorary Member, President of the United States.
- Garrett Cochran - head football coach at the University of California, Berkeley (1898–99), the United States Naval Academy (1900) and Princeton (1902), with a career coaching record of 29–5–3.
- Richard Coulter Jr. - Charter Member, Brigadier General in the U.S. Army in WWI; professional football player
- John F. Cregan - Olympic athlete; participated in the 1900 Olympic games earning a silver medal
- John Danforth - former United States Senator, Missouri.
- John R. DeWitt - Olympic athlete, St Louis Games of 1904; College Football Hall of Fame
- Selden Edwards - best-selling novelist, author of The Little Book and The Lost Prince, educator, and secretary of the Princeton class of '63
- William Hanford Edwards - author of Football Days, the definitive work on American Football in the 19th century; famous for saving the life of N.Y. Mayor William Gaynor by tackling his assailant.
- Yasser El Halaby - only male player to ever win the College Squash Association (CSA) individual national championship (Pool Trophy) four times.
- Barry S. Friedberg - former Executive Vice President of Merrill Lynch, and Head of Investment Banking, Chairman Emeritus of the New York City Ballet
- Robert Garrett - the first modern Olympic champion in the discus; organized the 4 Princetonians who competed in the 1896 Athens games; won two golds and two silvers in Athens, 1896, and two bronzes in Paris, 1900.
- Charlie Gogolak - football placekicker noted for his innovations; initially with the Washington Redskins and then the New England Patriots
- Wyc Grousbeck - former governor, CEO, and lead owner of the Boston Celtics. Rower on undefeated Lightweight Crew.
- Mitch Henderson - Franklin C. Cappon-Edward C. Green '40 Head Coach of Princeton Men's Basketball
- John Grier Hibben - honorary member; president of Princeton, 1920–32; he opposed President Wilson's plans to replace the Eating Clubs with a system of residential quadrangles.
- Arthur Hillebrand - head football coach at Princeton, 1903–05, his record was 27–4 and the team out-scored opponents 669–85; the 1903 team was 11–0 and was national champion.
- Thomas Hoving – former director of the Metropolitan Museum of Art
- Robert J. Hugin - chairman and President of Celgene, Inc.; elected Charter Trustee of Princeton in June 2012.
- Cosmo Iacavazzi - professional football player, a member of the New York Jets; inducted into the Pro Football Hall of Fame
- Herbert Jamison - member of the first U.S. Olympic Team at the first modern Olympic games in Athens, where he won a silver medal.
- Gordon Johnston - Colonel, U.S. Army, recipient of the Medal of Honor, the highest military award of the U.S.A.; head coach of the University of North Carolina (the Tar Heels) football team in 1896.
- Philip King - American football player, notable as a college football coach, especially at Georgetown University, compiling a career record of 73–14–1.
- Howard Krongard - known as "Cookie;" head of the Office of the inspector general of the Department of State
- Frank A. Lane - member of the first U.S. Olympic Team in Athens, 1896; technically, the first American to compete in the modern Olympiad; bronze medal winner
- Donald Lourie - Under Secretary of State for Administration, Eisenhower Administration; declined a pro football career with the Cleveland Browns.
- Jesse Marsch - player and professional soccer coach, current head coach of the Canada men's national team
- Roland S. Morris - American Ambassador to Japan, 1917–20.
- Michael Novogratz – digital assets and cryptocurrency investor, founder and CEO of Galaxy Digital
- Paul Rassam - head coach, Princeton women's lightweight rowing, multi time winners of IRA National Championship
- Pete Raymond - two time Olympic oarsman, won the silver medal in Munich in 1972; "a god among men."
- Wayne Rogers - actor, "Trapper McIntyre" for three seasons on "M.A.S.H."
- Michael Spence - Nobel Prize winner in Economics; Rhodes Scholar; former dean of the Stanford Graduate School of Business.
- George Augustus Vaughn, Jr. - known as "Ace," a World War I Flying Ace: officially credited with downing 12 enemy planes and one balloon
- Jesse Lynch Williams - Charter Member, prize winning author and dramatist, won the first Pulitzer Prize in drama in 1918 for the play Why Marry?
- A. M. Woods - lacrosse player and Olympic Athlete, 1904 games, where he earned a silver medal.
