= Ivy Club =

Eating club at Princeton University

- U.S. Historic district – Contributing property
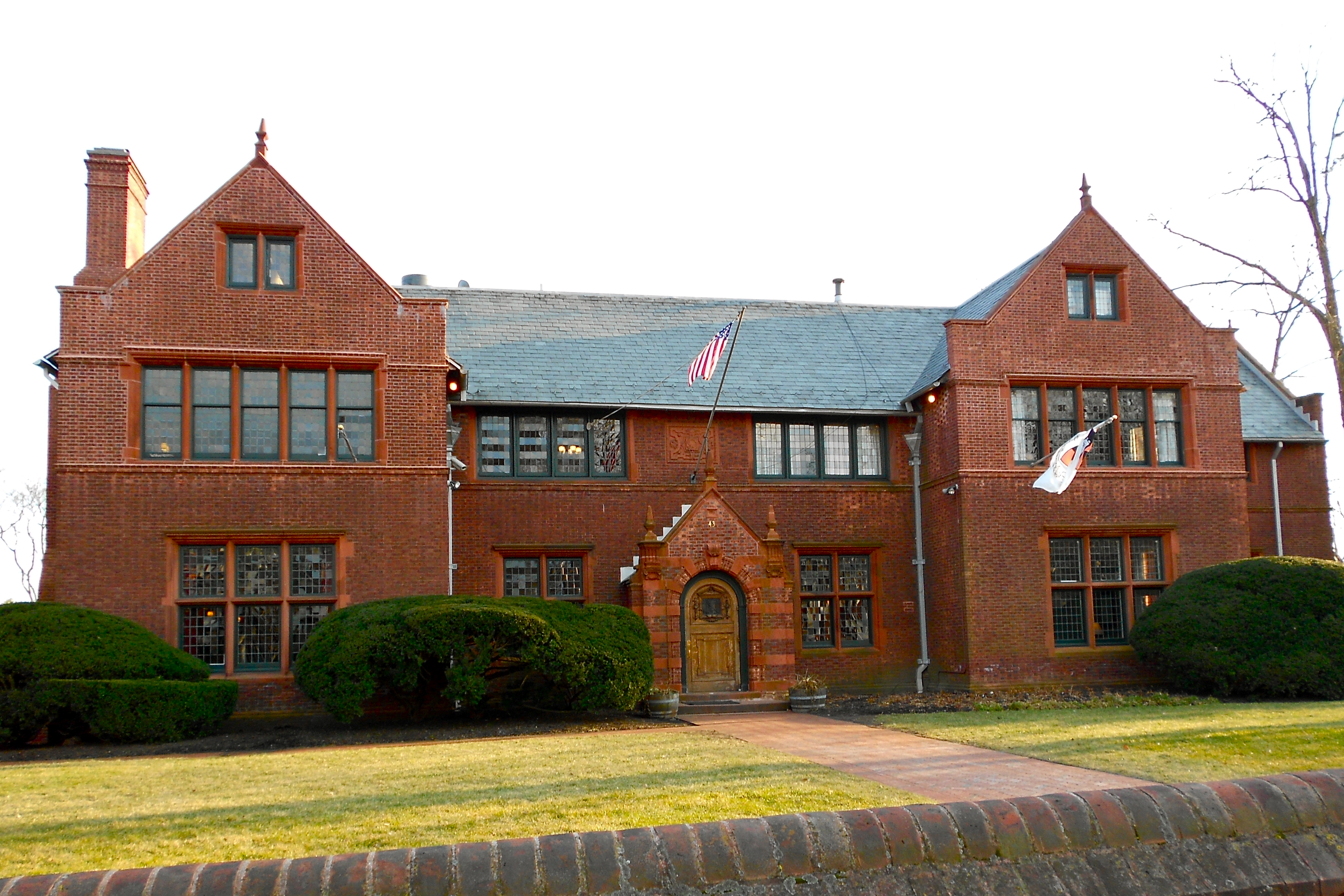
- Front of the club on Prospect Avenue

- Location within Mercer County, New Jersey Location within New Jersey Location within the United States
- Location: 43 Prospect Avenue; Princeton, New Jersey
- Coordinates: 40°20′53.4″N 74°39′08.0″W
- Built: 1897
- Architect: Cope and Stewardson
- Architectural style: Jacobethan
- Part of: Princeton Historic District (ID75001143)
- Added to NRHP: 27 June 1975

The Ivy Club, often simply Ivy, is the oldest eating club at Princeton University. It was founded in 1879 with Arthur Hawley Scribner as its first head.

== Club culture ==
The club is described by F. Scott Fitzgerald in This Side of Paradise (1920) as "detached and breathlessly aristocratic". A more recent account from 1999 described Ivy as the "most patrician eating club at Princeton University" where members "eat at long tables covered with crisp white linens and set with 19th-century Sheffield silver candelabra, which are lighted even when daylight streams into the windows."

== Membership ==
The club was one of the last to admit women, resisting the change until spring 1991 after a lawsuit had been brought against the Ivy Club, Tiger Inn, and Cottage Club by the Princeton student Sally Frank and her lawyer Nadine Taub. The members of each class are selected through the bicker process, a series of ten screening interviews, which are followed by discussions amongst the members as to whom of the remaining to admit. Current undergraduate members host regular "Roundtable Dinners" featuring talks by faculty and alumni.

== Clubhouse ==
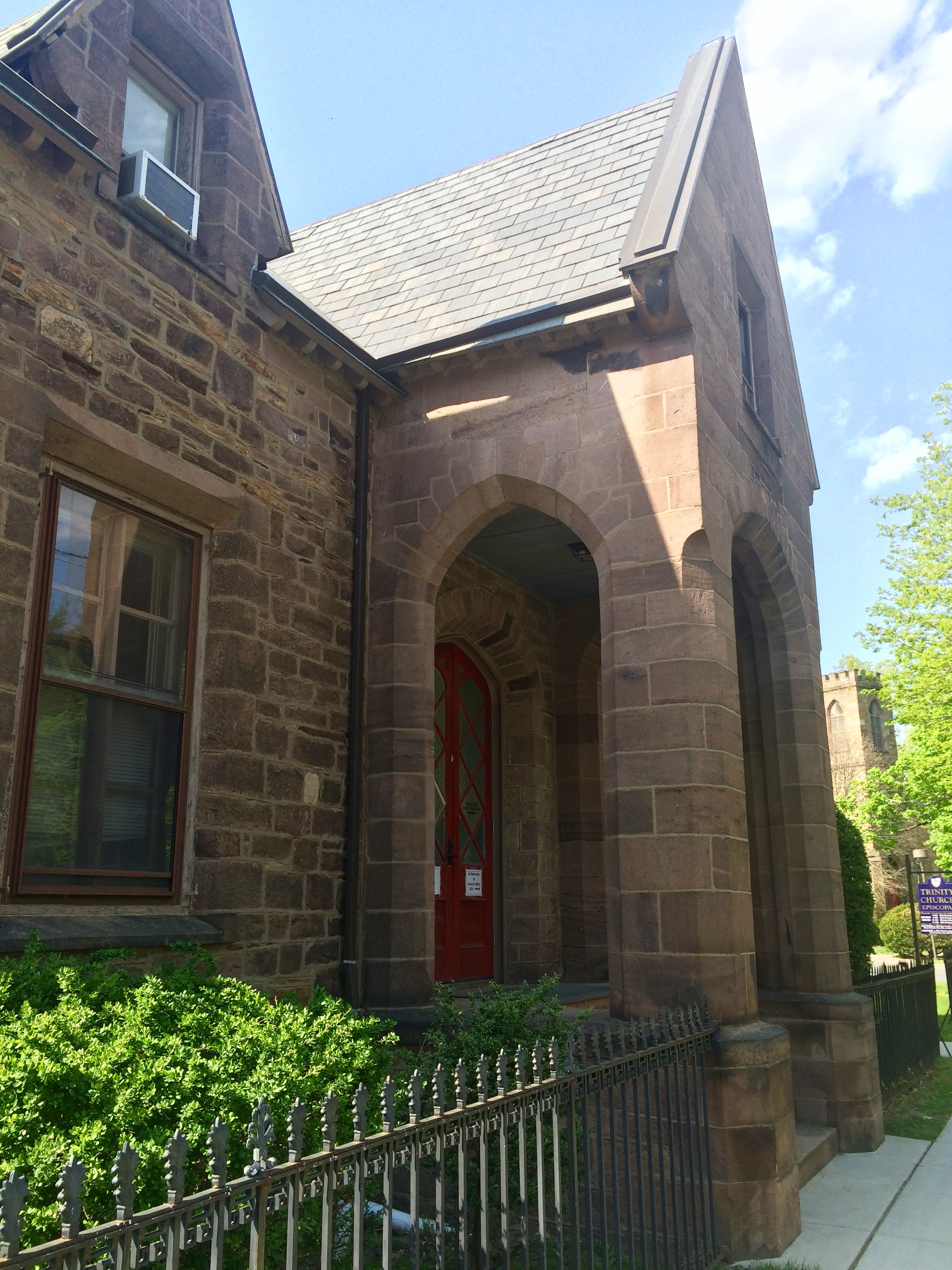
Ivy Hall, built to house Princeton's short-lived law school, later the first home of the Ivy Club, to which it gave its name

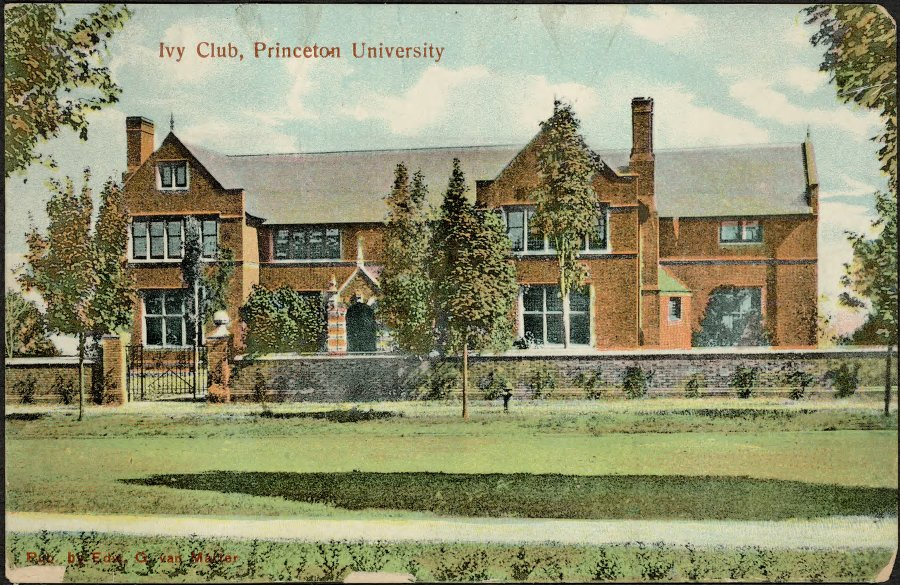
The current clubhouse as viewed in a 1909 photographic postcard

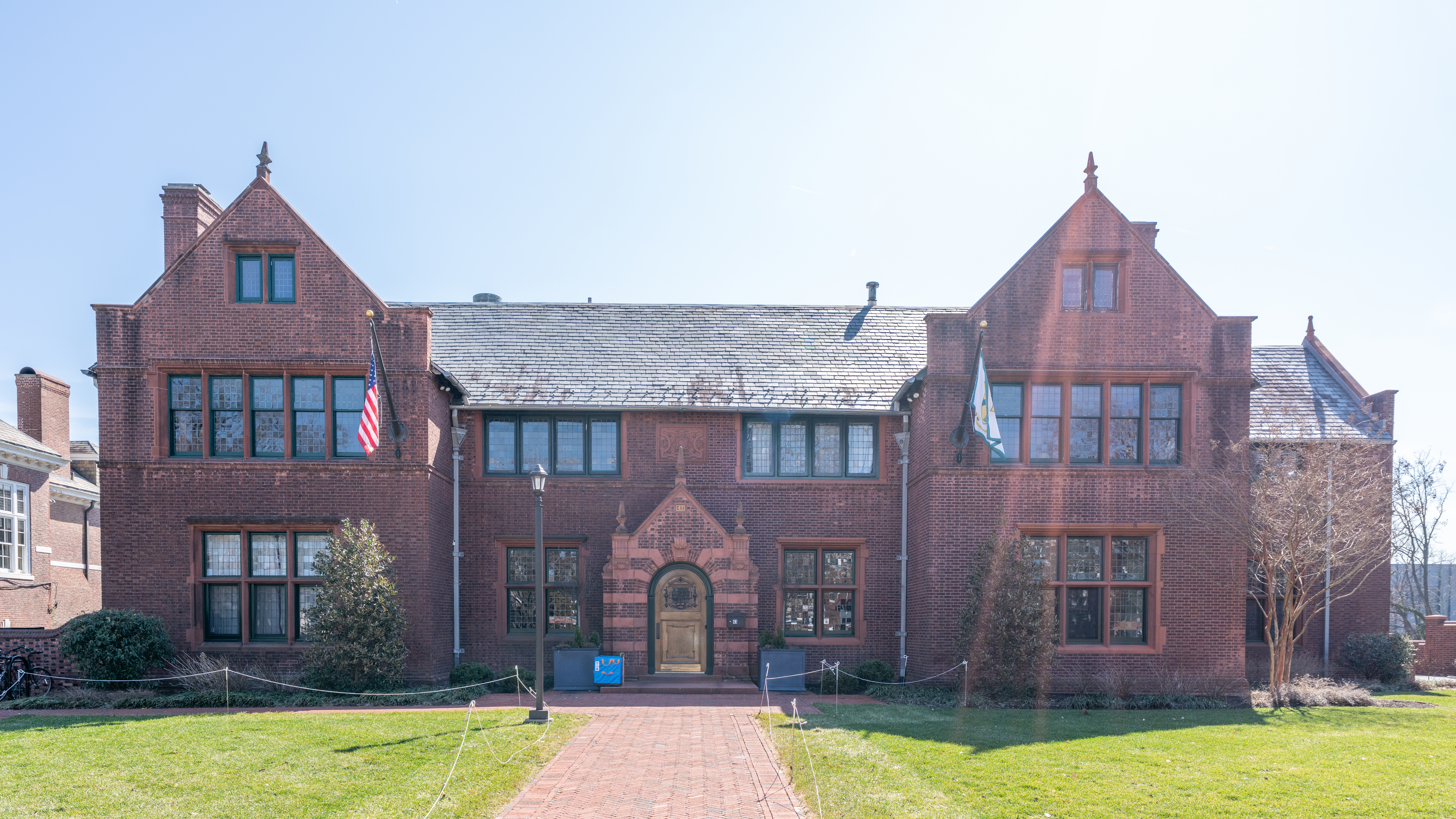
The clubhouse in 2026

The first clubhouse was Ivy Hall, a brownstone building on Mercer Street in Princeton that still stands. It had been constructed by Richard Stockton Field in 1847 as the home for the Princeton Law School, a short-lived venture that lasted from 1847 to 1852. From the time of its founding until its incorporation in 1883, the club was generally known as the "Ivy Hall Eating Club."

In 1883, the club purchased an empty lot on Prospect Avenue, which was a country dirt road at the time. Ivy erected a shingle-style clubhouse in 1884 on what is today the site of Colonial Club. The clubhouse was remodeled and extended in 1887–88. Following Ivy's move to new quarters across Prospect Avenue some ten years later, its second clubhouse was used by Colonial before being sold and moved to Plainsboro Township, New Jersey.

Ivy's third and current clubhouse was designed in 1897 by the Philadelphia firm of Cope & Stewardson. In 2009, the club completed its most significant renovation to date. The expansion added a second wing to the facility, changing the club's original L-shaped layout to a U. Designed by Demetri Porphyrios, the new wing includes a two-story Great Hall and a crypt to provide additional study space.

== Notable alumni ==
The following is a list of some notable members of the Ivy Club:

- Hobey Baker (1914) – World War I fighter pilot, member of the Hockey Hall of Fame and U.S. Hockey Hall of Fame
- James A. Baker III (1952) – Chief of Staff for Ronald Reagan; Secretary of Treasury and Secretary of State for George H. W. Bush
- Lem Billings (1939) – confidante and "first friend" of President John F. Kennedy who was Kennedy's freshman-year roommate at Princeton
- Joshua B. Bolten (1976) – White House Chief of Staff and Office of Management and Budget director under George W. Bush
- Philip Bobbitt (1971) – constitutional law scholar and author of The Shield of Achilles: War, Peace, and the Course of History
- Lauren Bush-Lauren (2006) – fashion model and niece of George W. Bush
- Joey Cheek (2011) – speed skater who won gold and silver medals in the 2006 Winter Olympics and co-founder and president of Team Darfur
- Leonard S. Coleman, Jr. (1971) – president of the National League
- Frank Deford (1962) – author and sports commentator
- Richard B. Fisher – philanthropist and chairman of Morgan Stanley
- Moira Forbes—president and publisher, ForbesWoman
- Bill Ford (1979) – Ford Motor Company
- Thomas F. Gibson – first political cartoonist of USA Today and Director of Communication under Ronald Reagan
- John Marshall Harlan II (1920) – Associate Justice, United States Supreme Court
- Frederick Hitz – Inspector General of the Central Intelligence Agency
- Ellie Kemper (2002) - American actress, comedian, and writer
- Arthur Krock – four-time Pulitzer Prize–winning journalist
- A.B. Krongard (1953) – executive director of the CIA
- Jim Leach (1964) – U.S. Congressman from Iowa and chairman of the National Endowment for the Humanities
- Blair Lee I (1880) – United States Senator from Maryland
- Blair Lee III (1938) – Governor of Maryland
- Michael Lewis (1982) – author of Moneyball and Liar's Poker
- Breckinridge Long (1904) – U.S. diplomat in the administrations of Woodrow Wilson and Franklin Delano Roosevelt
- Allan Marquand (1874) – logician whose Marquand diagram was a forerunner of the Karnaugh map
- Richard King Mellon – financier, banker, and philanthropist who led the urban renewal of Pittsburgh, Pennsylvania
- John Aristotle Phillips – entrepreneur specializing in political campaigns who became famous for attempting to design a nuclear weapon while a student.
- John Rawls (1931) – political philosopher, author of A Theory of Justice, originator of the concepts of original position and veil of ignorance
- Laurance Rockefeller (1932) – venture capitalist, philanthropist and environmentalist
- Randall Rothenberg (1978) – president and CEO of the Interactive Advertising Bureau
- Saud bin Faisal bin Abdul Aziz (1964) – Saudi Arabian Foreign Minister
- Arthur Hawley Scribner (1881) – first head of the eating club and president of publisher Charles Scribner's Sons
- Booth Tarkington (1893) – Pulitzer Prize–winning novelist
- Jim Thompson (1928) – OSS officer and Thai silk entrepreneur who famously and mysteriously disappeared in Malaysia in 1967
- Terdema Ussery – president and CEO of the Dallas Mavericks professional basketball team
- Rodman Wanamaker – arts patron, aviation pioneer, and founder of the Professional Golfers' Association of America (PGA)
- Woodrow Wilson – U.S. President, 1913–1921 (Associate Graduate Member)
- John Gilbert Winant – Governor of New Hampshire and U.S. Ambassador to the United Kingdom
- Frank G. Wisner (1961) – public servant and diplomat who served as U.S. Ambassador to Zambia, Egypt, the Philippines, and India.
- Jacob Candelaria -- New Mexico state senator, first openly gay man elected to the New Mexico Legislature and civil rights attorney.
