= Lost Prince =

Lost Prince may refer to:

- The Lost Prince (Burnett novel), 1915 British-American children's Ruritanian adventure
- "The Lost Prince" (Star Wars: Droids), 1985 Star Wars: Droids episode
- The Lost Prince, 2003 British television drama about Prince John, son of King George V
- The Lost Prince (Edwards novel), 2012 American historical time travel fantasy

== See also ==
- The Little Prince (Lost), 2009 fifth season episode of fantasy adventure TV series Lost
