= Fin-de-siècle Vienna =

1979 book by Carl E. Schorske

- Cover of the first edition featuring a preliminary sketch of Pallas Athene by Gustav Klimt
- Author: Carl E. Schorske
- Language: English
- Subjects: Geography, sociocultural evolution, ethnology, cultural diffusion
- Published: 1979 (Alfred A. Knopf, Inc.)
- Publication place: United States
- Media type: Hardcover, Paperback
- Pages: 378 pages (1st edition, hardcover)
- ISBN: 0-394-50596-4

Fin-de-siècle Vienna: Politics and Culture is a 1979 transdisciplinary nonfiction book written by cultural historian Carl E. Schorske and published by Alfred A. Knopf, Inc. Described by its publisher as a "magnificent revelation of turn-of-the-century Vienna where out of a crisis of political and social disintegration so much of modern art and thought was born," the book won the 1981 Pulitzer Prize for General Nonfiction. The book is lavishly illustrated with both color and black-and-white reproductions of key artworks, referenced in the text which explains their relevance to the themes in question.

== Synopsis ==
Partly reconstructed from Schorske's articles published in the American Historical Review, the book is structured into seven thematically interlocking chapters. Each chapter considers the interrelationships between key artists with the development of psychoanalysis and what was — at the time — viewed as an end of history.

In the 'Introduction' the author claims that the text was born from his desire 'to construct a course in European intellectual history, designed to help students to understand the large, architectonic correlations between high culture and socio-political change' (p. XVIII). In his view, Vienna was a peculiar cultural environment due to the late ascendancy and early crisis of its liberal middle class between the 1860s and the 1890s. This compression of the socio-political liberal hegemony provided the opportunity for a 'collective Oedipal revolt' against the liberal inheritance, promoted by "Die Jungen" (the Young Ones), spreading from politics in the 1870s to literature and art in the 1890s. The chronologically compressed and socially circumscribed character of the Viennese experience created a more coherent context for studying the different ramifications of its high culture (p. XXVI).

The second essay, "The Ringstrasse, its critics, and the birth of urban modernism" looks back to explore the liberal cultural system in its ascendancy through the medium of urban form and architectural style ... but it looks forward too … to the critical responses on the part of two leading participants in it — Otto Wagner and Camillo Sitte — reveal the emergence of conflicting tendencies, communitarian and functionalist, in modern thought about the built environment (p. XXVIII).

== Popular culture ==
Schorske's work was one of the major references for Selden Edwards' The Little Book, and serves as the model for a fictional book ("Random Notes", later edited and renamed Fin de Siècle) written by one of the main characters, Arnauld Esterhazy.
