= Carl Emil Schorske =

American historian

- Born: March 15, 1915; New York City, New York, U.S.
- Died: September 13, 2015 (aged 100); East Windsor Township, New Jersey, U.S.
- Other name: Charles E. Schorske
- Education: Columbia
- Alma mater: Harvard
- Awards: Pulitzer Prize for General Nonfiction, MacArthur fellow, honorary citizen of Vienna
- Scientific career
- Fields: Cultural history Author
- Workplaces: Princeton University

Carl Emil Schorske (March 15, 1915 – September 13, 2015) was an American cultural historian and professor at Princeton University. In 1981 he won the Pulitzer Prize for General Nonfiction for his book Fin-de-Siècle Vienna: Politics and Culture (1980), which remains significant to modern European intellectual history. He was a recipient of the first year of MacArthur Fellows Program awards in 1981 and made an honorary citizen of Vienna in 2012.

== Biography ==
Born in the Bronx, New York City, to Theodore Schorske and Gertrude Goldsmith. His parents were both German immigrants, his mother being of Jewish origin Schorske received his B.A. from Columbia in 1936 and a Ph.D. from Harvard in 1950. He served in the Office of Strategic Services, the precursor to the CIA, during World War II, as chief of political intelligence for Western Europe. His first book, German Social Democracy, published by Harvard University Press in 1955, describes the schism of the Social Democratic Party of Germany into a reformist/constitutionalist right faction and a revolutionary oppositionist left faction during the years 1905–1917.

Following his war-time service, Schorske taught at Wesleyan University (1946–1960), the University of California at Berkeley (1960–1969), and Princeton University (1969 until his retirement in 1980), where he was Dayton-Stockton Professor of History. Professor Schorske was named by Time magazine as one of the nation's ten top academic leaders. In 1987 he delivered the Charles Homer Haskins Lecture. In 1998 Schorske published Thinking With History: Explorations in the Passage to Modernism (Princeton University Press), a collection of essays on Viennese and general history. He turned 100 in March 2015 and died in September at a retirement community in Hightstown, New Jersey.

== Decorations and awards ==
In 2004 Schorske received the Ludwig Wittgenstein Prize of the Austrian Research Association (Österreichische Forschungsgemeinschaft). He was a Corresponding Member of the Austrian Academy of Sciences. On 25 April 2012 Schorske was made an honorary citizen of Vienna during a ceremony attended by his wife, Elizabeth Rorke, his granddaughter, Carina del Valle Schorske, and the mayor of Vienna, Dr Michael Häupl. In 1981 he was a MacArthur Fellow.

- 1985: City of Vienna Prize for Journalism
- 1996: Grand Silver Medal for Services to the Republic of Austria
- 2007: Victor-Adler State Prize for History of Social Movements
- Austrian Decoration for Science and Art

== Works ==
- German Social Democracy, 1905–1917: The Development of the Great Schism (1955, Harvard University Press) OCLC 869544
- Thinking With History: Explorations in the Passage to Modernism (1998, Princeton University Press) OCLC 37870707
- Fin-de-Siècle Vienna: Politics and Culture (1980) OCLC 5311052
- "A life of learning" Charles Homer Haskins lecture, April 23, 1987 OCLC 20595486
- Budapest and New York: Studies in Metropolitan Transformation, 1870–1930, with Thomas Bender (1994, Russell Sage Foundation) OCLC 28067119
