= American Civil Liberties Union of New Jersey =

American nonprofit civil rights organization, New Jersey branch of ACLU

- Abbreviation: ACLU-NJ
- Formation: 1960
- Headquarters: Newark, New Jersey
- Members: 15,000
- Director: Amol Sinha
- Parent organization: American Civil Liberties Union
- Website: www.aclu-nj.org

The American Civil Liberties Union of New Jersey (ACLU-NJ) is a nonpartisan, not-for-profit civil rights organization in Newark, New Jersey, and an affiliate of the national American Civil Liberties Union. According to the ACLU-NJ's stated mission, the ACLU-NJ operates through litigation on behalf of individuals, lobbying in state and local legislatures, and community education.

== History ==
The ACLU-NJ was founded on June 16, 1960, when North Jersey- and South Jersey-based ACLU members convened in Newark to officially form a statewide affiliate. In its first decade, the ACLU-NJ formed the Community Legal Action Workshop (CLAW) to advocate for inner-city victims of civil liberties violations in light of the Newark riots. Volunteer ACLU attorneys Ruth Bader Ginsburg and Annamay Sheppard, both of Rutgers School of Law–Newark at the time, argued the 1972 sex discrimination case of Abbe Seldin, who won her right to play tennis on the Teaneck High School men's team.

== Issues ==
The ACLU-NJ typically intervenes in civil liberties issues relating to free speech, the separation of church and state, election and voting rights, open government, privacy law, LGBT rights, reproductive freedom, women's rights, student rights, racial equality, police practices, prisoner rights, poverty rights, and immigrant rights.

=== Police ===
In New Jersey, police practices receive frequent attention from the ACLU-NJ. In 1967, the ACLU-NJ sued the State Police in the aftermath of the Plainfield riots, when state troopers searched 66 homes without a warrant.

==== Newark police ====
The relationship between the ACLU-NJ and the Newark Police Department has been particularly fraught since the ACLU-NJ's creation. After the Newark riots in July 1967 resulted in 26 deaths, the ACLU-NJ intervened on the behalf of arrested individuals and taught the population of Newark to document police brutality. Later that year, the ACLU-NJ petitioned unsuccessfully for the federal courts to oversee the Newark Police Department. In September 2010, the ACLU-NJ filed a similar petition with the Department of Justice in response to recurring complaints of police brutality and abuse

=== Open government ===
The ACLU's New Jersey chapter has also made open government a priority. In 2009, the ACLU-NJ announced the Open Governance Project, an initiative dedicated to government transparency and ease of access to government meetings and documentation.

== Notable Lawsuits ==
=== Kreimer v. Morristown ===
From 1989-1991, the ACLU supported Richard Kreimer's rights to use the Joint Free Public Library of Morristown and Morris Township. Kreimer was homeless and the library's leadership, supported by the Morristown police, prohibited him from using the library due to bad personal hygiene and a habit of staring at other patrons. The ACLU persuaded the Library to modify certain rules against loitering and then continued to assist Kreimer in his quest for restitution.

=== Galluccio ===
In 1997, the ACLU-NJ took on the case of Jon Holden and Michael Galluccio, a gay couple fighting to adopt their two-year-old foster son. They won the case, and New Jersey consequently became the first state to grant equal standing to gay and lesbian couples seeking to adopt.

=== Sally Frank ===
The ACLU-NJ served as co-counsel to Sally Frank, a Princeton University student fighting for the acceptance of women into the all-male Eating Clubs on campus beginning in 1979. Frank was represented by Nadine Taub, who went on to make the argument that the clubs, though private organizations, were public accommodations actively discriminating on the basis of gender. The legal battles concluded over ten years later in 1992, with all Eating Clubs accepting women.

=== Yorker, et al. v. Township of Manalapan, et al. ===
On August 25, 2004, the ACLU-NJ filed Yorker, et al. v. Township of Manalapan, et al. in state court on behalf of three African-American youths who were searched and subjected to discriminatory treatment by Manalapan police officers. The officers allegedly told the boys' three white friends that they could go home. Manalapan Township paid $275,000 to settle the lawsuit.

== Funding ==
The ACLU-NJ operates on donations. In the 2009-2010 financial year, the ACLU-NJ reported 31% of income from contributions, 1% from bequests, 17% from dues, <1% from court awarded attorney fees, 10% from grants, 40% from investment income, and <1% from other income.

== Organization ==
The ACLU-NJ consists of the ACLU-NJ and the ACLU-NJ Foundation. The ACLU-NJ is a 501(c)(4) nonprofit corporation, which funds legislative lobbying. "Card-carrying" members belong to this organization, the gifts to which are not tax-deductible. Donations to the ACLU-NJ Foundation, on the other hand, are tax-deductible because this branch operates as a 501(c)(3) nonprofit corporation, focusing on litigation and public education.

=== Board ===
Members nominate and elect a board of trustees from around the state who serve three-year terms. The board sets policy, raises funds, and provides legal and fiduciary oversight.

=== Director ===
Udi Ofer assumed the role of executive director of the ACLU-NJ in 2013. He is responsible for overseeing the organization's legal, legislative, public education, and fundraising programs. Under his leadership the organization achieved numerous successes. The ACLU-NJ co-founded New Jersey United for Marriage, which organized an unprecedented campaign to win the freedom to marry for same-sex couples in New Jersey. The ACLU-NJ also successfully advocated for Newark to adopt the nation's most comprehensive stop-and-frisk reporting policies, and for the Newark Police Department to refrain from honoring immigration detainers, thus ensuring that immigrant communities may contact the police without fearing deportation. Prior to joining the ACLU-NJ, Ofer founded the Advocacy Department of the New York Civil Liberties Union (NYCLU) and helped transform the organization's work. Under his leadership, the NYCLU achieved many victories, including in the areas of racial justice, students' rights, and immigrants' rights. He is best known for his work challenging the NYPD's stop-and-frisk abuses, and spearheading the effort to pass through the New York City Council legislation banning racial profiling by the NYPD and creating an NYPD Inspector General's office. Ofer has authored more than a dozen law review articles and reports, including in the Columbia Law School Journal of Race and Law, Fordham Law School Urban Law Journal, and New York Law School Law Review. He is a frequent commentator on civil liberties and civil rights issues on local and national media, including in The New York Times and National Public Radio. Ofer began his legal career in 2001 as a Skadden Fellow and staff attorney at My Sisters' Place, a domestic violence organization where he represented women on their immigration and public benefits matters. From 2009-2012, Ofer served as an adjunct professor at New York Law School. Ofer is a graduate of Fordham University School of Law and the State University of New York at Buffalo. He is the recipient of numerous awards, including a 2007 "Distinguished Graduate Award" from Fordham Law School, and a 2013 "Distinguished Contributions to Law and Justice Award" from Rider University.

=== Legal director ===
Ed Barocas has served as legal director for the ACLU-NJ since May 2001, overseeing the ACLU-NJ's legal program, and managing a docket of over 30 cases. Barocas served for six years as Special Counsel for the Special Hearings Unit of the Office of Public Defender in Newark, where he represented convicted sex offenders in tier classification and notification hearings and litigated class-action suits challenging the constitutionality of Megan's Law. He managed the Unit's largest office, covering six New Jersey counties. He also taught a course at Rutgers Law School. Prior to serving as Special Counsel, Barocas was an Assistant Deputy Public Advocate for the Division of Mental Health Advocacy in Wall, New Jersey, where he advocated for the rights of the mentally ill on individual and hospital-wide bases. He negotiated reform of adolescent behavioral programs and proposed a policy for community placements and for the closure of a psychiatric hospital, which was presented by the Protection and Advocacy Advisory Council to Governor Whitman and was later adopted. Barocas also has copyrights for over 40 comedy and political parody songs. He has performed with members of Blood, Sweat & Tears, and had an album scheduled for release in spring 2010. He attended Rutgers College in New Brunswick and received his Juris Doctor in May 1992 from the National Law Center at George Washington University.
