= The Lost Prince (Edwards novel) =

- Author: Selden Edwards
- Language: English
- Genre: Novel
- Publisher: Dutton
- Publication date: August 16, 2012
- Publication place: United States
- Media type: Print (Hardcover)
- ISBN: 9781101590973

The Lost Prince is a sequel to the best-selling novel The Little Book by American writer Selden Edwards. It was published by Dutton in August 2012.

== Plot ==
The Lost Prince follows the character of Eleanor Burden, an 1890s Boston socialite who has resigned herself to marrying the man she should be with rather than the man she wants, whom she lost in Vienna. What separates her from others of her station and background is that Eleanor believes that she has the ability to predict all of the major historical events that will occur while she is alive. Dismissed as a hysteric, Eleanor must decide whether or not fate is predetermined or if she possesses the ability to change future events as well as her own life.

== Critical reception ==
Reception for The Lost Prince has been positive and nationwide, with Publishers Weekly praising Edwards' way of "connecting historical events and philosophical ideas, and also connecting this book to his first." Kirkus Reviews also praised the novel, saying "throughout the novel, Edwards skillfully intertwines Eleanor’s predestined fate with her relationships to Freud, Jung, J. P. Morgan, William James and other historical figures...a powerful, intense and fascinating read."

The Los Angeles Times hailed its treatment of "big ideas" such as destiny, history, the role of the individual, and undying love. According to the Times, “there's no denying the sweetness of unshakable faith that infuses the core of The Lost Prince.”

External videos
- You can see Selden Edwards talking about writing, and the writer's life, here

The Washington Post described The Lost Prince as “ingeniously plot-driven: Each chapter constitutes a polished short story in which Eleanor pulls off some near-impossible task to bend current events to the dictates of the journal."

The San Francisco Chronicle wrote: “This is a strange and unique love story. On the heels of Edwards' debut novel, The Little Book, the author has crafted a daring follow-up…the book is a meditation on love, faith, free will and one's purpose in life.”

The Deseret News hailed The Lost Prince as “a provocative novel of destiny, free choice and sacrifice...Edwards' novel is a compelling tale of sacrifice in the name of family and love, reminding readers of the importance of each decision they will make throughout their lives, whether significant or trivial.”

External audio
- You can hear Selden Edwards talking about writing, psychology, and the role of mythos here.

The Santa Barbara Independent noted that both The Lost Prince and The Little Book “proceed from the premise that Wheeler Burden, Harvard baseball hero, philosopher, and rock star, has the ability to travel back from California in 1988 to Vienna, Austria, circa 1897. The action that follows from this rent in the fabric of time brings together such historical figures as Sigmund Freud, Gustav Mahler, and William James with the Burden clan, who are strictly the product of Edwards’ remarkable imagination.”

Marie Claire Magazine hailed it as a great summer read, saying that "With a cast of characters that includes Sigmund Freud, Carl Jung and William James, it's like Midnight in Paris for the neurotic set."

The Historical Novel Society praised The Lost Prince as "entertaining, thought-provoking, and highly recommended." Capital Region Living Magazine found it "compelling and fascinating...if you enjoy great story-telling, Selden Edwards is an author you should read."
