= Sally Frank =

American legal academic and women's rights activist

- Education: MA, Clinical Legal Education Antioch University JD, New York University School of Law AB, Princeton University
- Occupation: Law professor
- Employer: Drake University
- Known for: Suing Princeton eating clubs to become co-ed
- Movement: Women's rights

Sally Frank sued the three all-male eating clubs at Princeton University in 1978 for denying her on the basis of her gender. Over ten years later, in 1990 the eating clubs were defined as "public accommodation" and court ordered to become co-ed due to the efforts of Sally Frank, her attorney Nadine Taub and the Women's Rights Litigation Clinic of Rutgers Law School. The eating clubs argued that they were completely private and separate from the university, giving them the right to sex discrimination. After many rounds in the courts, this argument eventually failed. The winning argument stated that the clubs were in fact not separate, and instead functioned as an arm of the university itself. This meant that the clubs were in the end covered by New Jersey's anti-discrimination law and forced to admit women.

Throughout the legal process, the clubs pushed back hard. In the 1980s the clubs sold shirts featuring a picture of Frank's face, given a mustache and the slogan "Better Dead Than Coed." Ultimately, Cottage Club decided to become coed in 1986, but both Ivy Club and Tiger Inn continued to appeal the decision, even after the final court order in 1990. The appeal went all the way to the US Supreme Court but was unsuccessful in changing the decision.

== History ==
=== Eating clubs ===
When Princeton became co-ed in 1969, some of the eleven eating clubs introduced coed policies immediately. A year later, five more clubs accepted female members. By 1971, only three all-male clubs remained: Cottage Club, Ivy Club, and Tiger Inn. The eating clubs are at the center of the campus life and many upperclassmen go there for dinner every night. They are about more than just eating however; the social significance of the clubs is great, and leadership roles in particular are a sign of status and achievement. Even today they are a tool for social stratification and face critiques of exclusiveness, particularly on the subjects of race and class. Their elitist nature has long been the cause of controversy. Cottage Club and Ivy Club in particular are known for having a lot of "legacy people," meaning those at the end of multi-generational lists of Princeton alumni.

Eating clubs initially grew out of the university's ban on fraternities in the late 1800s and the lack of dining options on campus. The university does not regulate them to this day, allowing them to be fully managed and operated by their student members. The clubs say they are not affiliated with the school, yet around three-quarters of the school's upperclassmen eat all their meals there and 68% of them are members. Membership lasts for life and can be an important way to access alumni networks.

=== Sally Frank denied membership ===
In the fall of 1977, Sally Frank, a sophomore at Princeton, applied for membership to the all-male eating clubs under the name S.B. Frank and with gender marked as male. Frank received appointments at all five of the most selective eating clubs, three of which were male-only. While many clubs allow students to simply sign-up and choose based on a lottery system, the more exclusive clubs require them to go through a process called bickering, a lengthy interview process similar to rushing at traditional fraternities or sororities. Frank was allowed to attend her appointments but was ignored by the clubs and did not receive bids, or invitations to join. Two other women who also tried were denied. The president of Cottage Club said at the time that women were not "legitimate candidates." The president of Tiger Inn said, "They were not offered a bid because they were registered illegally for Bicker."

=== Sex discrimination lawsuit ===
While angry, Frank did not decide to sue until she took a summer job at the ACLU of New Jersey and the executive director explained that she could sue based on the fact that the clubs are public accommodations. When she returned her junior year, she registered to bicker again knowing it would make her case stronger if she had been rejected after multiple attempts. She was refused appointments. The clubs' presidents said "their primary responsibility is toward sophomore males" and Frank's presence "might disrupt the process, noting that last year club members complained [to him] after Frank bickered."

After being denied twice, she went to the Rutger's Women's Rights Litigation Clinic for support. In February 1979, Taub took on the case, and filed a lawsuit against all three male-only clubs and the university, each of which insisted that the clubs were exempt from anti-discrimination law because they were private, non-university institutions. Taub's argued the opposite, that their integrated nature with the university meant they were covered under the same laws.

In the first of many losses, the N.J. Division on Civil Rights ruled that the clubs were private in June 1979. Later the same year, Frank filed a complaint with the U.S. Department of Health and Human Services stating that the university endorsed a discriminatory policy by providing security and maintenance for the eating clubs. The department began an investigation but dismissed the case in April 1980. Despite this loss, the N.J. Division on Civil rights agreed to re-hear the case. Throughout this legal fight, Frank continued to complete her final undergraduate years at Princeton. During the rest of her time there she endured verbal and physical harassment, including frequently receiving obscene phone calls from Cottage members. Even after her graduation the eating clubs continued to vilify her.

The eating club lawyers seemed to enjoy displaying their blatant sexism. Frank recalled the Tiger Inn lawyer wearing Playboy bunny suspenders to a settlement conference.

Frank went on to earn her Juris Doctor degree from New York University School of Law and became her own co-counsel in the ongoing suit. Frank described working alongside Taub and learning from her, "Nadine was a role model and an incredible feminist [...] She was a strategic thinker and a sharp litigator, and working with someone of that depth and commitment was a remarkable experience. She taught me how to be a lawyer."

While Frank continued the fight on a legal level, female students at Princeton in the 1980s continued to push for inclusion on campus. In 1985, a petition collected over 300 signatures calling on the all-male clubs to accept women, supported by the on-campus Women's Center, established in 1971. It was the cause of much debate and tension on the campus.

The lawsuit was re-heard in 1980, then dismissed a second time. It was appealed and won, then in 1982 the decision was reversed. In 1985 the N.J. Division on Civil Rights finally ruled that the clubs were not private because they were bound by "historical, not just superficial ties." Ivy Club and Tiger Inn fought back, filing countersuits in 1986 and appealing the decision. The judge who heard the countersuit, Robert Miller, stated that the clubs could sever formal ties with the university and remain all-male. Just before the decisions, though, the university expressed public support for Frank and agreed to pay her attorney fees in a settlement. Eventually another ruling in 1987 said that the law required the clubs to go co-ed.

In 1988, Cottage Club admitted 27 women in the first year of co-ed bickering. Tiger Inn and Ivy Club remained male-only and continued to push back, appealing the decision again. Later that year the ruling of 1987 was reversed and Frank and Taub had to start over.

On campus students continued the fight, including founding the organization "Coalition for Coeducated Eating Clubs." They brought in professors, administrators and alumni, which helped campus attitudes shift. They held multiple demonstrations and got on-campus sponsorships, such as from the Women's Center.

Finally, the N.J Supreme Court ruled that the eating clubs would have to open for women on July 3, 1990. Women joined Ivy Club for the first time the following fall. Tiger Inn still did not accept women, and continued to appeal the case all the way to the U.S. Supreme Court who then denied their petition in 1991. In February 1991, 27 women were accepted into the Tiger Inn, the last club to allow them to join.

== Aftermath ==
In the time since the lawsuit ended, the gender balance has significantly shifted at Princeton and in its eating clubs. Still, Sally Frank's legal fight is not fully forgotten on campus. In 2014, two student officers in Tiger Inn were removed from their positions for emails they sent, one with a sexually explicit photograph and the other about Sally Frank herself. This situation was then used to push for an increase in female leadership.

In 2015, Tiger Inn elected its first female president. In 2018, women held the club president positions in nine of the eleven eating clubs.
