= Randall Rothenberg =

American businessman

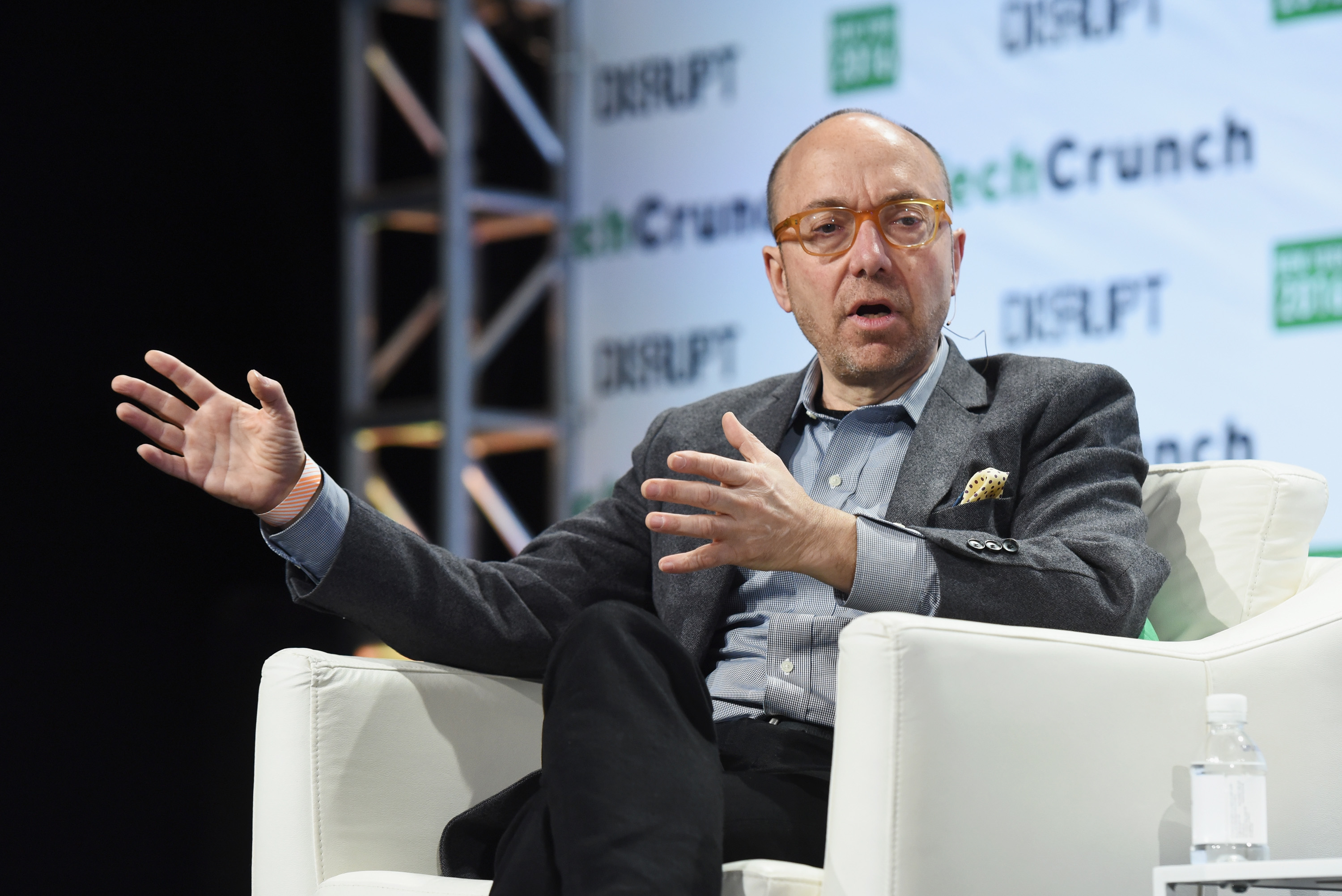
Randall Rothenberg, 2016

Randall Rothenberg is an American business executive, author, and former news and business reporter. He currently serves as Executive Chair for the Interactive Advertising Bureau, the trade association for interactive marketing in the U.S.

== Biography ==
Before joining the IAB in 2007, Rothenberg was the Senior Director of Intellectual Capital of Booz Allen Hamilton, where he oversaw business development, knowledge management, and thought leadership activities, and directed the award-winning quarterly business magazine strategy+business, Strategy+Business Books, www.strategy-business.com, and other electronic and print publications published for senior business executives by Booz Allen. He has also served as the firm’s CMO.

Prior to Booz Allen, Randall spent six years at The New York Times, as the technology editor and politics editor of the Sunday magazine, the daily advertising columnist, and a media and marketing reporter. For 10 years, he was a marketing and media columnist for Advertising Age.

In 2010 Rothenberg briefly left the IAB to become the first Chief Digital Officer of Time Inc., in what was reported as the first major personnel move by Time's new CEO Jack Griffin. Six months later, after Time fired Griffin, Rothenberg returned to the IAB.

In 2013 Rothenberg compared developers at Mozilla Foundation to "mob rule" for their position on online privacy.

== Books ==
Rothenberg wrote the 1994 book Where the Suckers Moon: The Life and Death of an Advertising Campaign, which discussed changes in the advertising industry, using as a case study Subaru's problematic 1991-1993 effort to enliven its cars' staid image by engaging Wieden+Kennedy, an ad agency with a reputation for "cool". Rothenberg also wrote The Neoliberals: Creating a New American Politics, a 1984 study of the influence of neoliberalism in the U.S. Democratic Party.

== Personal life ==
Rothenberg was born to a Jewish family and received an undergraduate degree in classics from Princeton University in 1978, where he was a member of the Ivy Club.
