= Thomas F. Gibson =

American cartoonist

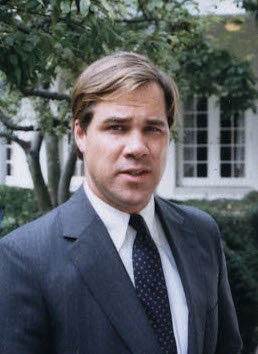
- Gibson at the White House in 1985
- Born: Thomas Fenner Gibson III; January 23, 1955 (age 71); Indianapolis, Indiana
- Other name: Tom Gibson
- Education: Princeton University (A.B.); Harvard University (M.P.A.)

Thomas Fenner Gibson III (born January 23, 1955), better known as Tom Gibson, is an American former editor and cartoonist who was on the Opinion staff of USA Today at its founding, has worked with The Washington Post, The Atlantic Monthly, The New York Times, and the National Journal, served on the White House staff of President Ronald Reagan, and has worked extensively in the communications, international affairs, health care, aviation and non-profit fields.

== Career ==
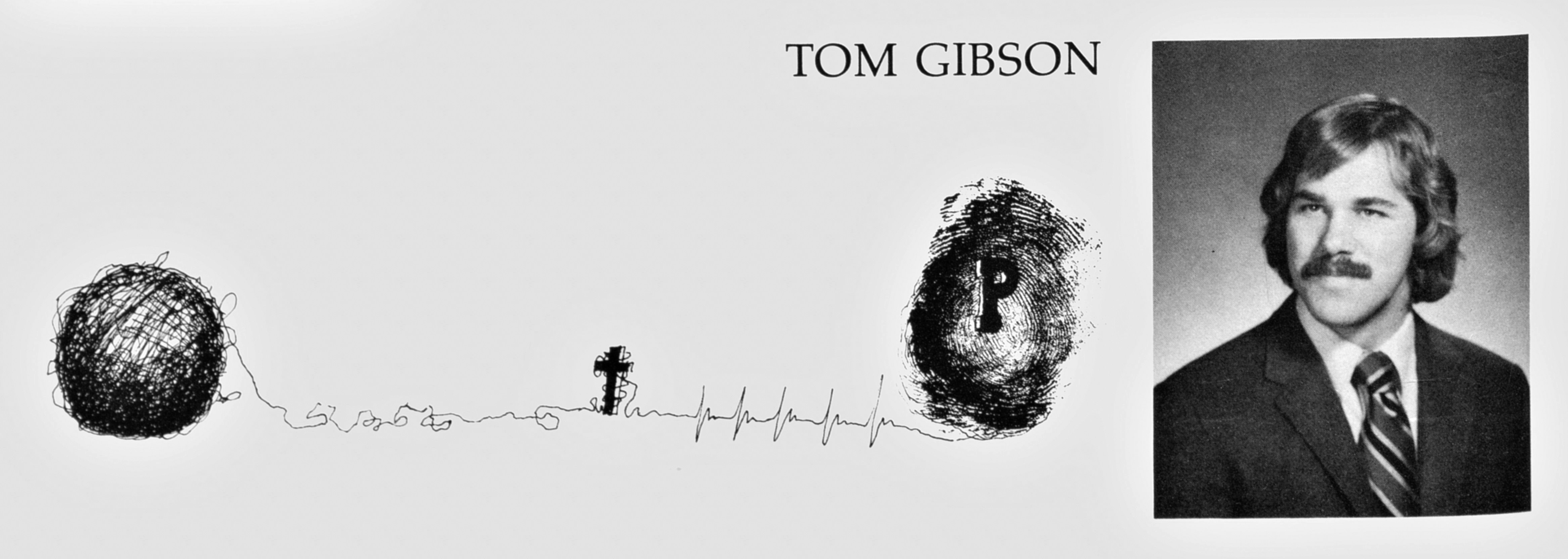
Gibson in the Princeton University yearbook, 1977

After college, Gibson moved to Washington, DC, where he worked as a free-lance cartoonist before joining the staff of Senator Dewey Bartlett as a legislative assistant responsible for issues related to foreign and military affairs. After short stints on the legislative affairs staffs of Arnold & Porter and The Brick Institute, Gibson enrolled at The Harvard School of Government, earning his MPA degree in 1982.

Returning to Washington, DC, Gibson became the first cartoonist and an opinion editor on the staff of USA Today at its founding.

In 1983 Gibson joined the White House staff of President Ronald Reagan, serving as Associate Director of White House Cabinet Affairs, responsible for the Cabinet Councils on Economic Affairs, Legal Policy and Management and Administration. Subsequently, from 1985 to 1987, Gibson served as Director of White House Public Affairs.

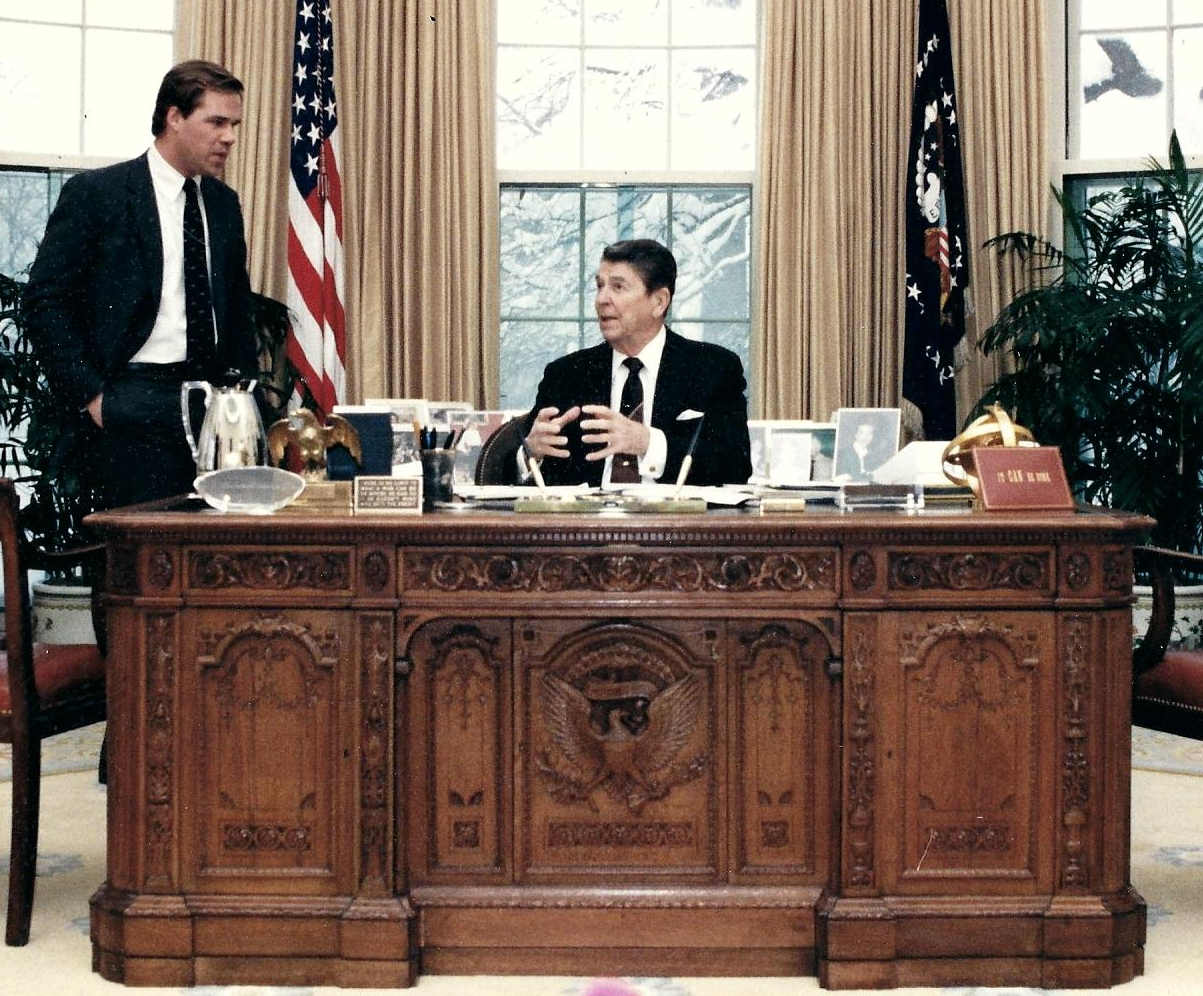
Thomas F. Gibson meeting with President Ronald Reagan in the Oval Office on January 22, 1987.

After leaving the administration, Gibson joined the Wexler Group, the public affairs and strategic communications firm founded by Anne Wexler, as a Senior Vice President. In 1996, he was recruited by MCI, where he served as Director of Special Projects, reporting to the CEO and working on issues related to the Internet and international expansion.

In 1998, Gibson joined Dr. Taylor Wang and others in forming Encapsulife, Inc., with Gibson continuing to serve as its president. Encapsulife is a private corporation created to commercialize Dr. Wang's nano-technology and bio-medical research, with its first focus being the development of a "living cell bio-artificial pancreas that does not require immunosuppression drugs to prevent rejection in diabetics" which would provide a "functional cure" for Type I diabetes.

In 1999, Gibson formed his own communications and public affairs firm, Kirkwood/Gibson, and subsequently joined forces with the White House Writers Group, a collection of former high-level White House and executive branch communications professionals.

Also in 1999, Gibson was appointed Senior Vice President for Corporate Affairs of Mooney Aircraft, a manufacturer of high-performance piston aircraft. Working out Washington, DC, he focused on industry and government relations, fleet sales and new business.

Gibson founded Advocacy Animation in 2001 with the goal of creating an animated cartoon that could be produced within a 24-hour news cycle.

In 2002 Gibson joined former US Air Force Chief of Staff Gen. Ronald Fogleman in establishing Durango Pro-Focus Flight Training, which created an ab initio flight training program in conjunction with Midland College. While the college provided the academic portion of the program, Durango Pro-Focus was responsible for flight instruction, employing "military precision and performance standards in a commercial pilot training environment." In 2004, the college assumed responsibility for flight instruction, as well.

Subsequently, Gen. Fogleman retired from Durango Pro-Focus Flight Training, which changed its name to G.83 Aerospace, elected Gibson as its new president, and broadened its range of aviation-related services to include "light-aircraft production management, logistics, air-medical transport, aircraft finance, general aviation policy advocacy, marketing consulting services, ISR platform development and systems integration, and new light tactical and very light tactical aircraft development."

In 2003 Gibson founded New Generation Foundation to promote access to opportunity for young people. New Generation Foundation has supported a number of initiatives, including Airborne Lifeline Foundation (on the board of directors of which Gibson also served), which provides a flying medical service in Botswana and Malawi, and the Squash Diabetes! Campaign launched by the Georgetown University Women's Squash Team.

== Education ==
Gibson graduated cum laude from Princeton University with an A.B. in politics in 1977 after completing a 155-page long senior thesis titled "The American Political Cartoon: A Consequential Participant in Our Political System." He then earned an M.P.A. from the John F. Kennedy School of Government at Harvard University in 1982.
