= Rudolph Jay Schaefer I =

American businessman (1863–1923)

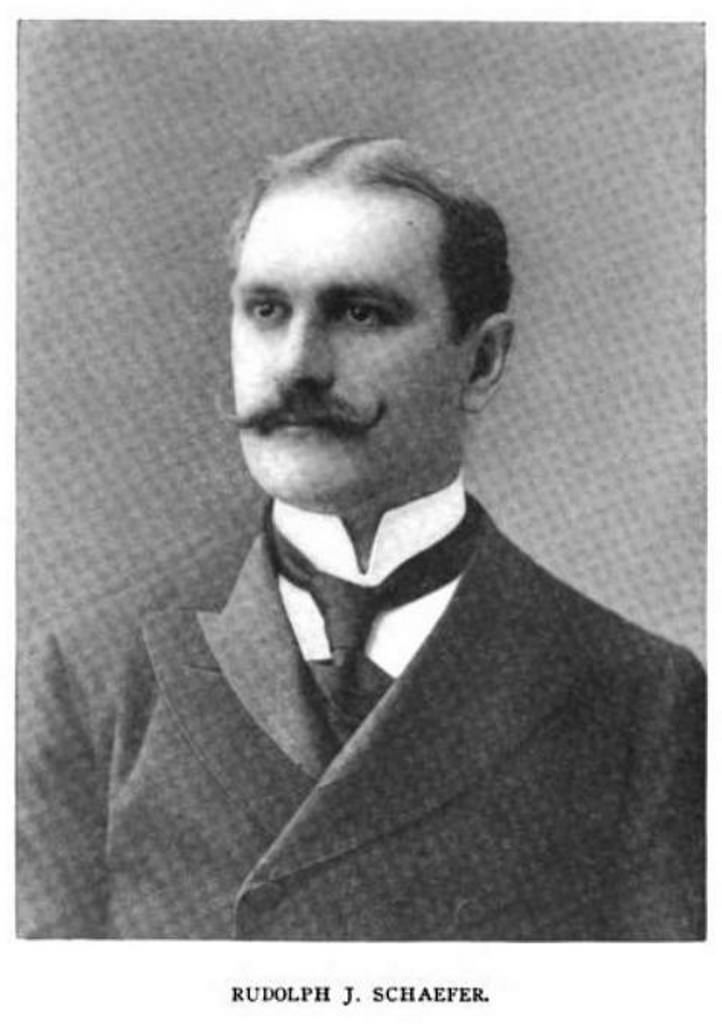
- Schaefer circa 1900

President of F. & M. Schaefer Brewing Company

Personal details
- Born: February 21, 1863 Manhattan, New York City
- Died: November 9, 1923 (aged 60) Larchmont, New York

Rudolph Jay Schaefer I (February 21, 1863 - November 9, 1923) was an American businessman who was the president of F. & M. Schaefer Brewing Company.

== Biography ==
Schaefer was born on February 21, 1863, in Manhattan, New York City, to Maximilian Karl Emil Schaefer (1819–1904) and Ernestina Catherine Johanna Mathesius (1832–1898). He married Frederica Vilette Beck on October 15, 1890, in Manhattan. He died of pneumonia on November 9, 1923, in Larchmont, New York.
