= Selden Edwards =

American writer

- Born: Selden Spaulding Edwards; 1941 (age 84–85); Sacramento Valley, California
- Education: Princeton; Stanford; Pacifica Graduate Institute
- Occupations: Novelist; headmaster; teacher
- Spouse: Gaby

Selden Spaulding Edwards (born 1941) is an American writer and educator. His first novel The Little Book was a New York Times bestseller. His second novel The Lost Prince, a sequel to The Little Book, was published by Dutton in 2012.

== Early life ==
Born in 1941, Edwards grew up in Marysville, a small farming town in the Sacramento Valley of California. His father, Harold Edwards, was manager of a family prune and almond ranch there. His great grandfather Samuel Edwards arrived in Santa Barbara in the 1880s, and built a large Victorian house at State and Valario streets. He planted the famous Moreton Bay fig tree that still stands today.

== Education ==
Edwards' family placed a high value on education. His maternal grandfather Edward Selden Spaulding founded the Laguna Blanca School. Edwards attended Marysville public school through tenth grade, then Noble and Greenough School, a Boston private school, and graduated from Princeton University with an A.B. in religion in 1963 after completing a senior thesis titled "Awareness and Response". He was a member of Tiger Inn and played basketball at Princeton during the Franklin "Cappy" Cappon era, on a team famously known as the Scrubby Guns.

Edwards obtained a master's degree in Education from Stanford University and a PhD in Mythology and Depth Psychology from Pacifica Graduate Institute. He also attended the first three Community of Writers at Squaw Valley in 1969, 1970 and 1971.

== Lifelong educator ==
After graduating from Princeton in 1963, Edwards began a lifelong commitment to education. This included teaching at Cate School, the Taft School and other private schools; and the headmastership of the Sacramento and Crane Country Day Schools in California, and the Elgin Academy in Illinois. At the Crane School, for ten years in the 1980s, Edwards appreciated "the opportunity to create the supportive student-centered school he had always wanted".

Edwards was also secretary of his Princeton class for over 45 years, since 1966.

== The Little Book ==
In 1974, when he was a young teacher in California, Edwards started to write a novel. Over the next thirty years he toiled over the same manuscript – revising it, adding layers and complexity to the tale. Winters and summers, when his colleagues were on vacation and his family was outside enjoying Santa Barbara, Lake Tahoe or rural Michigan, Edwards would remain in his study and write. Each time he completed a new draft, he would send it to publishers and agents, but to no avail.

Upon his retirement from teaching in 2003, Edwards gave it one last try. Working with renowned editor Pat LoBrutto, he spent another year on the manuscript. This time there was no rejection slip. A literary agent called him "almost immediately" and submitted his novel to Dutton, whose editors purchased it within four days.

Published in 2008, The Little Book is the story of Wheeler Burden – philosopher, student of history, rock idol, Harvard baseball hero, victim of the grandfather paradox, and inventor of the frisbee. With the velocity of Kurt Vonnegut and the scope of Bellow's Adventures of Augie March, Edwards traced three generations of a family who mysteriously appear together in 1897 Vienna, and encounter key figures in intellectual, political and artistic history – including Gustav Mahler, Sigmund Freud, Ludwig Wittgenstein and Adolf Hitler.

External videos
- You can see a video about the creation of The Little Book on YouTube

The Little Book was a New York Times best-seller and a critical success.

Publishers Weekly found it "a sweet, wistful elegy to the fantastic promise and failed hopes of the 20th century". NPR hailed it as "a historical time travel fantasy that's an ideal late summer reading getaway, complete with screwball hidden identity plots and even lively background music…Edwards handles the hectic demands of a multistranded plot with deftness and humor."

The novel was also noted for its "balanced, powerful style", and "a maturity that is exceedingly rare". In general, The Little Book was found "a masterpiece of unequaled storytelling that announces Selden Edwards as one of the most dazzling, original, entertaining novelists of our time".

== The Lost Prince ==
Edwards' second novel was a sequel to The Little Book. Titled The Lost Prince, it is the story of Eleanor Burden, "a crucial silent playmaker in world history, influencing the likes of Sigmund Freud, Carl Jung, and William James, all while maintaining the facade of a Boston socialite and devoted wife".

The Lost Prince was published by Dutton in August 2012. In a starred review, Publishers Weekly praised Edwards' way of "connecting historical events and philosophical ideas, and also connecting this book to his first". They also hailed Edwards' epic rendition of turn-of-century Boston and World War I Europe, noting that "Edwards' bird's-eye view of the details of this momentous age makes this companion piece as much fun as his debut."

The Los Angeles Times praised its treatment of "big ideas" such as destiny, history, the role of the individual, and undying love. According to the Times, "there's no denying the sweetness of unshakable faith that infuses the core of The Lost Prince.”

The Washington Post described The Lost Prince as "ingeniously plot-driven: Each chapter constitutes a polished short story in which Eleanor pulls off some near-impossible task to bend current events to the dictates of the journal".

The San Francisco Chronicle wrote: “This is a strange and unique love story. On the heels of Edwards' debut novel, The Little Book, the author has crafted a daring follow-up…the book is a meditation on love, faith, free will and one's purpose in life.”

External videos
- You can see Selden Edwards talking about writing, and the writer's life on YouTube

According to Kirkus Reviews "throughout the novel, Edwards skillfully intertwines Eleanor's predestined fate with her relationships to Freud, Jung, J. P. Morgan, William James and other historical figures...a powerful, intense and fascinating read."

The Santa Barbara Independent noted that both The Lost Prince and The Little Book "proceed from the premise that Wheeler Burden, Harvard baseball hero, philosopher, and rock star, has the ability to travel back from California in 1988 to Vienna, Austria, circa 1897. The action that follows from this rent in the fabric of time brings together such historical figures as Sigmund Freud, Gustav Mahler, and William James with the Burden clan, who are strictly the product of Edwards' remarkable imagination."

Marie Claire Magazine hailed it as a great summer read, saying that "With a cast of characters that includes Sigmund Freud, Carl Jung and William James, it's like Midnight in Paris for the neurotic set."

External audio
- You can hear Selden Edwards talking about writing, psychology, and the role of mythos here.

The Deseret News hailed The Lost Prince as "a provocative novel of destiny, free choice and sacrifice...Edwards' novel is a compelling tale of sacrifice in the name of family and love, reminding readers of the importance of each decision they will make throughout their lives, whether significant or trivial."

The North County Times found that "Edwards' love for his characters – even the frightening J.P. Morgan with his bulbous nose – is striking and effective. They have blossomed and thrived under the caring, brilliant tutelage of a gifted author, whose enthusiasm seems boundless."

The Historical Novel Society praised The Lost Prince as "entertaining, thought-provoking, and highly recommended". Capital Region Living Magazine found it "compelling and fascinating...if you enjoy great story-telling, Selden Edwards is an author you should read".

== See also ==
- Notable Princeton alumni
- Notable Stanford alumni
- Notable Tiger Inn members
