= Schaefer Beer =

Purveyor of alcoholic beverages

- Manufacturer: F. & M. Schaefer Brewing Company
- Introduced: 1842 in New York, New York
- Alcohol by volume: 4.6%
- Style: American-style lager

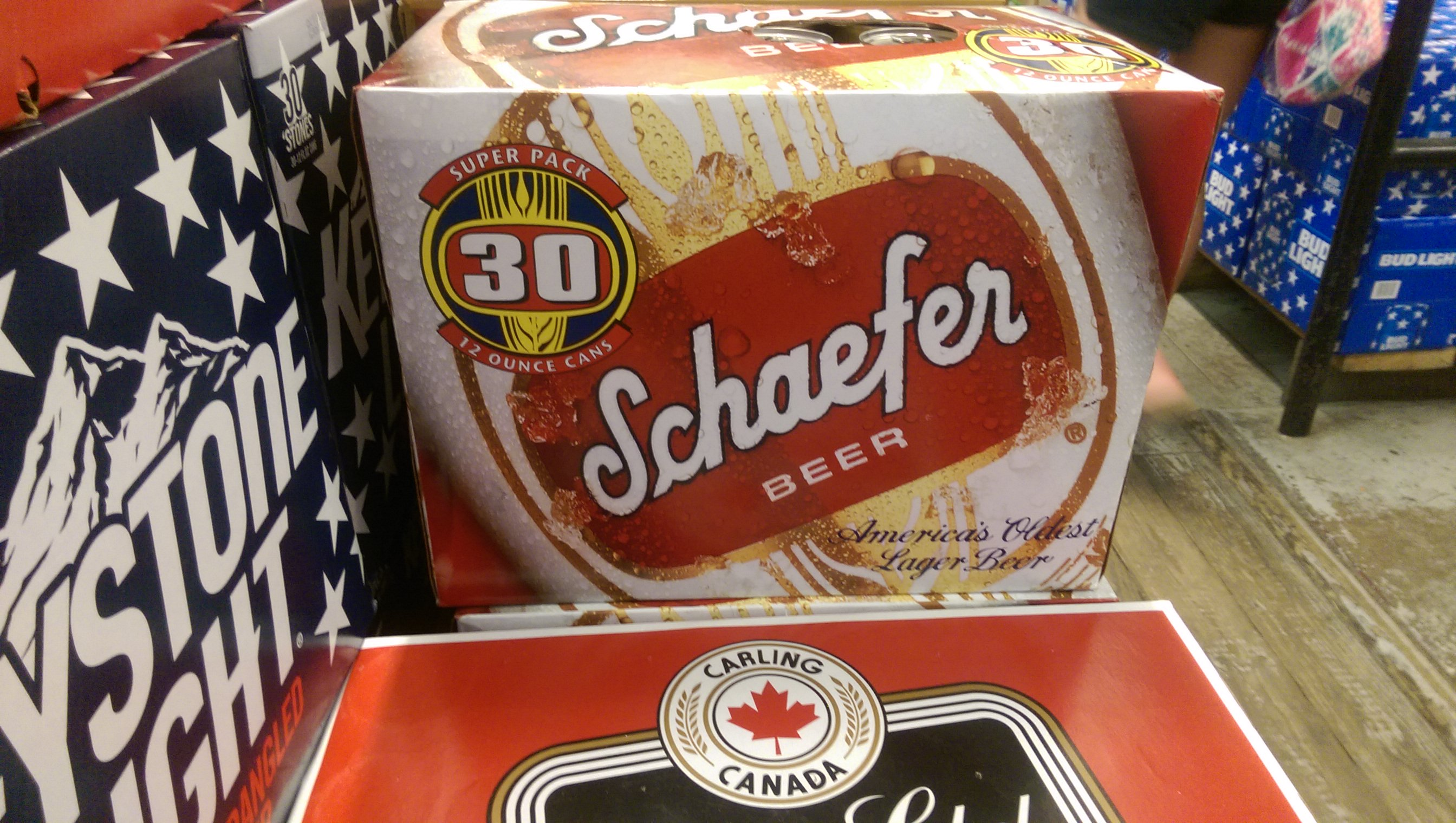
A 'super pack' of 30 cans of Schaefer Beer

Schaefer Beer is a brand of American beer first produced in New York City during 1842 by the F. & M. Schaefer Brewing Company. The company relocated to Brooklyn in the early 20th century. It went public in 1968 with a $106 million stock offering.

In order to expand capacity for regional sales and fend off competition from national brands, Schaefer began construction of a large modern brewery in Breinigsville, Pennsylvania (near Allentown) that same year. Known as the Lehigh Valley Plant, it opened in 1972. In 1974, it was expanded from its original 1.1 million barrels-per-year capacity to 2.5 million, and then enlarged again in 1975 to over 5 million barrels.

In both the 1950 and 1970 rankings Schaefer Beer was one of the top selling beers in the US, ranking as high as fifth. Though it was producing more than twice as much beer in 1980, the gap between it and the top national brands was dramatically widening. In 1981, the Schaefer family sold the company to the Stroh Brewery Company.

Stroh's then took over the Allentown plant in its own bid for national market share. It operated the plant until the company was absorbed by Pabst Brewing Company in 1999. Just two years later, Pabst divested its facilities and opted to become a "virtual brewer", it sold the plant to Diageo. In 2008, Diageo sold it to the Boston Brewing Company, the brewer of Samuel Adams beer.

Pabst retained the license to Schaefer, and as of 2021 outsourced a reformulated brew it labels "Schaefer" and sells in niche markets in the United States.

== Advertising campaigns ==
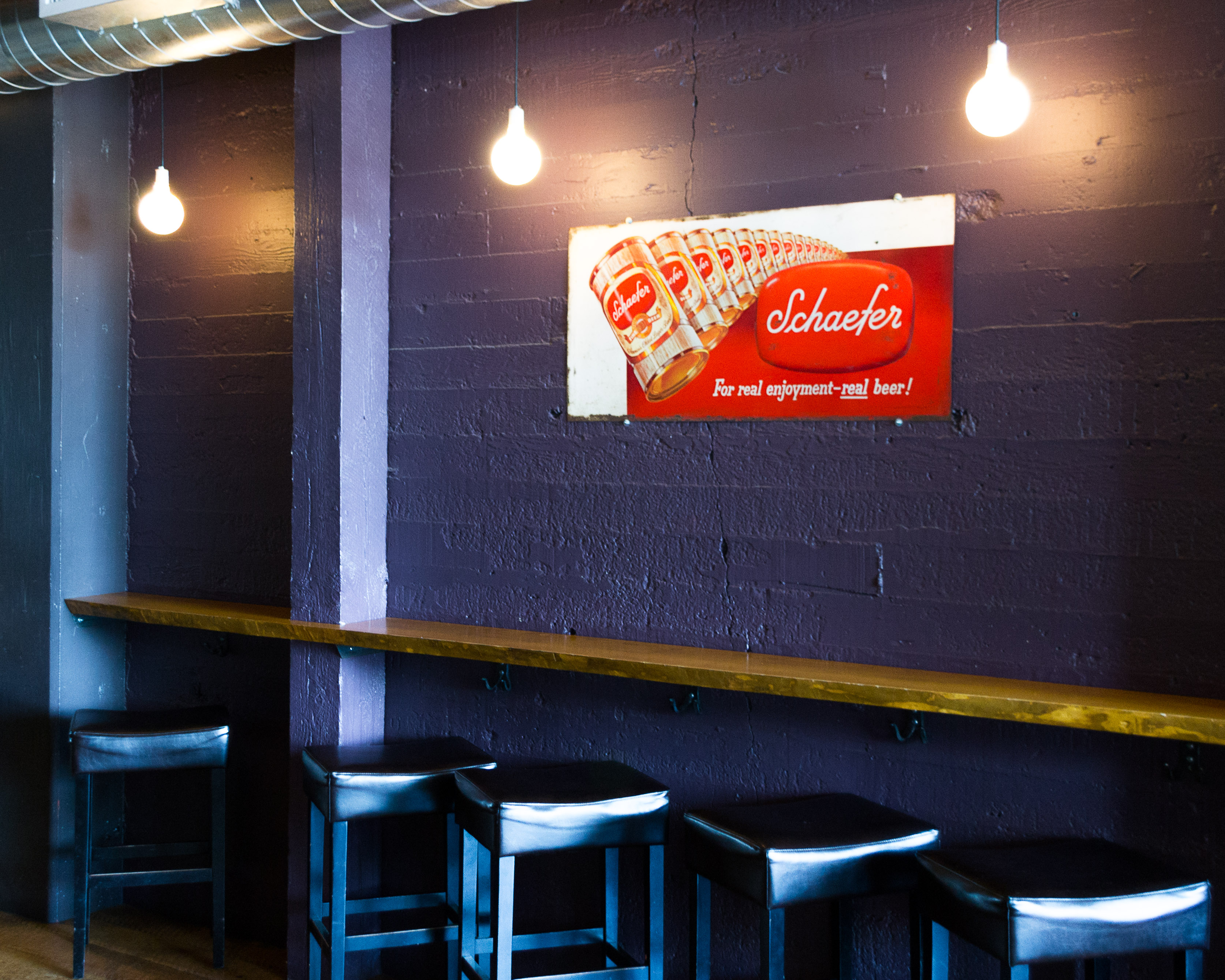
An original Schaefer Beer promotional sign

The advertising slogan for Schaefer beer is the jingle "Schaefer is the one beer to have when you're having more than one." An earlier advertising campaign from the 1950s asserted, "What do you hear in the best of circles? Schaefer, all around!" In Spanish, Schaefer's slogan was "Es la mejor, cuando se toma mas de una!" ("It is the best, when you are having more than one!")

Schaefer had major exhibitions at both of New York City's World's Fairs, held in Flushing Meadows Park. During both the 1939 New York World's Fair and the 1964 New York World's Fair, Schaefer sponsored "Schaefer Center", a restaurant that used beer as an ingredient in many dishes.

Schaefer was the official beer sponsor of the Brooklyn Dodgers from 1951 until the franchise's departure for Los Angeles following the 1957 season. During that span, one of its advertisement was featured at the top of Ebbets Field's scoreboard on the right-field wall. The letters h or the first e on the wordmark lit up depending on whether the official scorer ruled that a batter reached base on a hit or an error, respectively.

Foxboro Stadium, the home stadium of the New England Patriots from 1971-2001, was originally named Schaefer Stadium after the beer company paid naming rights for the privilege, one of the earliest known examples of a stadium selling naming rights. After 12 years, the contract expired and the name was changed to Sullivan Stadium in 1983 (after the family that owned the team).

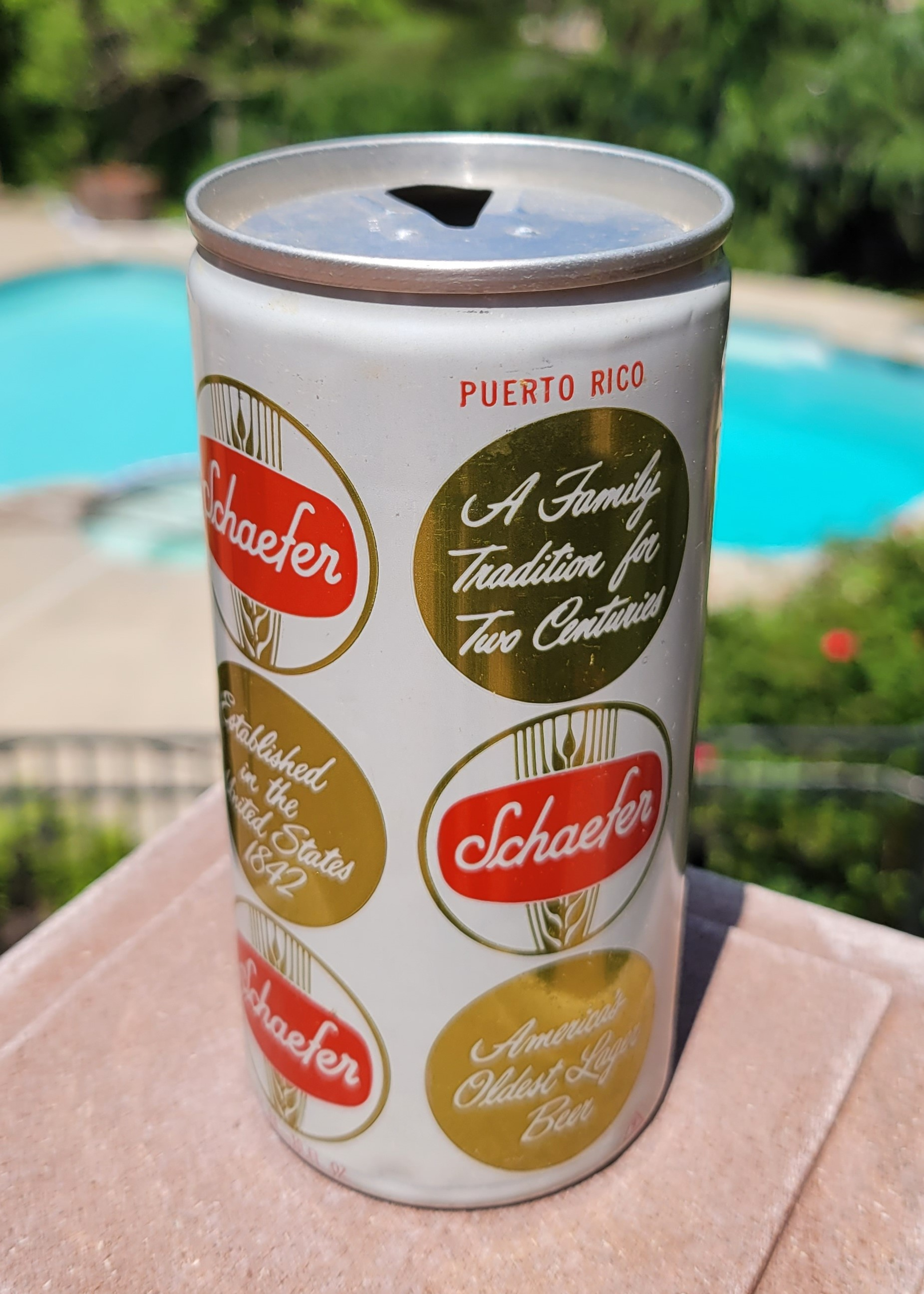
A vintage Schaefer beer can (originally for sale in Puerto Rico)

During the 1970s and 1980s, Schaefer was one of the top selling beers in Puerto Rico and Guam. A large Schaefer beer billboard was once displayed at the main entrance to the city of Bayamón. Schaefer still holds the record for being the beer with the most unit sales in Puerto Rico, 13 million cases in a year, in 1979-80. It became well known among Puerto Rican salsa fans.
