= F. & M. Schaefer Brewing Company =

Brewing company in Manhattan, New York

Schaefer Brewing Company
- Location: Milwaukee, WI formerly New York, NY
- Opened: 1842
- Closed: 1981
- Owner: Pabst Brewing Company
- Website: www.schaefer-beer.com

Active beers
Name	Type
Schaefer Beer	American-style lager
Schaefer Light	Light beer

F. & M. Schaefer Brewing Company was an American brewing company located in New York, New York and later in Milwaukee, Wisconsin. It was acquired by Stroh Brewing Company in 1981.

== History ==
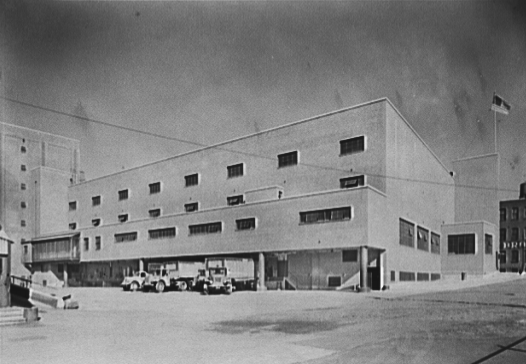
Schaefer Brewing Co., Kent Ave., Brooklyn, New York on February 13, 1941

It was founded in 1842 by brothers Frederick Schaefer (1817-1897) and Maximilian Karl Emil Schaefer (1819–1904), natives of Wetzlar, Prussia, Germany.

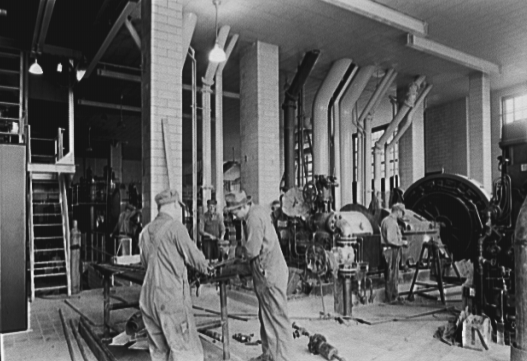
Brewery workers Kent Ave., Brooklyn in 1941

Frederick emigrated to the U.S. in 1838, followed by Maximilian in 1839. Maximilian brought the recipe for lager beer with him. After working for them, they saved up enough money to acquire the Sebastion Somers Brewing Company. How this was managed, and what brewing experience the pair brought from Germany, is unclear. What they did bring was a recipe for lager beer, reputedly brewing one of the first such light, crisp, cold brewed and cold aged beers in America in 1848, which they later claimed was the first in the United States, although John Wagner of Philadelphia preceded him in 1840.

In time the operation proved highly successful, rising into the number six slot among American brewers by 1871.

Max's son Rudolph Jay Schaefer took over as president until his death in 1923.

The firm had a large brewery complex on Park Avenue in New York City and caves for lagering its beer along the East River. In the early 20th century it sold the valuable plant real estate and opened a new brewery in Brooklyn. In 1949, the company was affected by the 1949 New York City brewery strike.

By the 1950s and again in the 1970s Schaefer was the number five beer in America.

As it grew it purchased several regional breweries, including in Albany, New York, Cleveland, Ohio, and Baltimore, Maryland. A $106 million public stock offering was held in 1968, with the F.& M. Schaefer Corporation emerging as a holding company for its production subsidiary, the Schaefer Brewing Company. Pursuing greater efficiency, it built a large, high-output plant in Allentown, Pennsylvania in the Lehigh Valley, which opened in 1972 and resulted in closure of the company's remaining satellite breweries. In 1974 it was expanded from its original 1,100,000 barrels-per-year capacity to 2,500,000 and then, in 1975, it expanded again to 5,000,000 barrels plus.

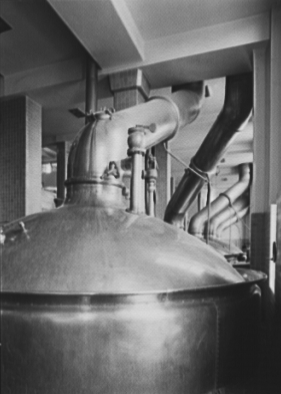
Brewing Kettles at Kent Ave., Brooklyn on February 10, 1948

In 1981 Schaefer was acquired by Stroh Brewing Company which, in turn, was acquired by Pabst Brewing Company in 1999.

== Legacy ==
Schaefer continues today as a virtual beer produced as a Pabst label. The company's preservation society, Team Schaefer, is centered in Long Beach, California. The F. & M. Schaefer Brewing Company is not related to Engels and Schaefer Brewing Company of Cedarburg, Wisconsin.

Schaefer's former Lehigh Valley brewing facility was later sold to Diageo North America, Inc. and used for the production of Smirnoff Ice malt beverages. In 2008, the Boston Beer Company, best known for its Samuel Adams brand, purchased the brewery from Diageo.

== Sponsorships ==
The company sponsored the Schaefer Music Festival at Wollman Skating Rink in New York City's Central Park from 1968 to 1976, hosting some of the biggest names in popular music.

Schaefer was the primary advertiser on the Ebbets Field scoreboard, home of the Brooklyn Dodgers. The "H" or "E" in "Schaefer" would light up to signify the scorer's decision as to whether a ball in play was a hit or an error.

From its opening in 1971 until 1983, Schaefer owned the naming rights to Schaefer Stadium, the then-home of the New England Patriots of the NFL, in one of the earliest examples of such rights granted to a company that did not own that stadium. The name was changed to Sullivan Stadium when Schaefer did not renew its contract in 1983; the stadium would be renamed Foxboro Stadium in 1990, retaining that name until its 2002 closure.

The company also sponsored a long-running television program of quality first-run motion pictures, titled "Award Theatre" (also known as "Schaefer Award Theatre"). The series presented such movies with only four commercial interruptions. In New York City, the program ran several times a year on WCBS-TV through the late 50s and early 60s.
