= Nadine Taub =

American lawyer and professor (1943–2020)

- Born: January 21, 1943; Princeton, New Jersey, U.S.
- Died: June 16, 2020 (aged 77); Manhattan, New York, U.S.
- Education: B.A. Economics Swarthmore College (1964); LL.B. Yale Law School (1968)
- Occupations: Lawyer, Professor
- Employer: Rutgers Law School (1973-2000)
- Known for: Women's rights, feminism, legal activism
- Spouse: Olof B. Widlund

Nadine Taub (January 21, 1943 – June 16, 2020) was an American lawyer who laid the essential groundwork for women's rights in the workplace, including defending and winning the first sexual harassment case in the US in 1977. Taub played a pivotal, but largely unrecognized, role in the development of sexual harassment law in the United States. As part of a group of young female lawyers in the 1970s, including Ruth Bader Ginsburg, Nancy Stearns and others, Taub made legal history by winning cases which argued that the Constitution protected women's rights.

== Early life and education ==
Taub was born on January 21, 1943, in Princeton, New Jersey. Her father, Abraham Haskell Taub, a math professor, was teaching at Princeton when she was born. Her mother, Cecilia (Vaslow) Taub was a homemaker.

Taub attended Swarthmore College, receiving a B.A. in economics in 1964. She then got her law degree from Yale Law School, graduating with the class of 1968.

== Career ==
After her graduation from Yale, she provided legal services for low-income people in the Bronx. She then went on to work for the ACLU in Newark. After the ACLU, Taub starting teaching at Rutgers Law School in 1973 and continued until her retirement in 2000.

While teaching, Taub continued work as an active lawyer, was the faculty advisor for the Women's Rights Law Reporter (the first US legal periodical to focus exclusively on the field of women's rights law), and a member of the New Jersey Task Force on Domestic Violence.

In 2017, Rutgers honored Taub by creating a scholar's position in her name.

=== Women's Rights Litigation Clinic ===
Soon after beginning her teaching position at Rutgers, Taub founded the Women's Rights Litigation Clinic (WRC) of Rutgers Law School, the first of its kind in the country. In the 1970s, legal clinics like this one were both a new source of legal representation and a new educational tool, where students were able to work on real cases.

As the WRC's director, Taub worked with students on many of the most important cases in her career from establishing sexual harassment as a form of sex discrimination to developing ways for battered women to get protection from their attackers.

== Landmark cases ==
Taub litigated cases many related to women's rights, creating new legal protections in many different areas. For example, she fought for the rights of rape victims, women seeking access to abortion, and female employees dealing with discrimination and sexual harassment in the workplace.

=== Abortion access in New Jersey ===
Taub won a case which compelled three private hospitals in New Jersey to open their facilities for women electing to have abortions in 1974. The case went all the way to the State Supreme Court and crucially established the legal basis for abortion practices and policies for both private hospitals and church-supported hospitals, where religious beliefs were previously cited to refuse patients the right to elective abortions.

In her defense of the plaintiffs, Taub argued that these three hospitals provided the "only adequate health and maternity care in the area. She also held that, by refusing to permit abortions, they were depriving the plaintiffs and other women, as well as doctors willing to perform the operation, of their constitutional rights to terminate a pregnancy." The refusal was in violation with a state law, which mandated that hospitals provided full heath services. The lawsuit states that even if the hospitals are private, they are institutions for public welfare and they cannot refuse to provide medical care, including abortion. Taub was able to take this case to court and win because of the groundwork laid by landmark case Roe v. Wade, decided by the Supreme Court only the year before in 1973.

=== Imprisonment of Newark rape victim ===
In 1974, Taub defended a woman who the police jailed after she came to them to report her rape. They kept her as a material witness to her own assault because they believed she was a prostitute. In 1976, Taub won the court order, which was designed to end abuses of the material-witness statute. The Newark Police Department agreed to restrict its use of the statute according to new court-approved guidelines and paid the woman $3,000 in damages. The new guidelines stated that police officers must have probable cause to believe that the witness has important evidence about the crime, that the crime itself was committed, that the witness is unlikely to appear for further proceedings, and the police officer verifies their address. Every aspect of the guidelines must be met and a potential witness can only be held for a few hours while the determinations are made, specifically without being put in a jail cell while they wait.

The suit was brought by the Community Legal Action Workshop of the American Civil Liberties Union of New Jersey and the Women's Litigation Clinic on behalf of the woman who suffered the police abuse. After the case was won, Stephen M. Nagler, director of the New Jersey ACLU, said that the court order should "substantially curtail the tendency by police to hold people without probable cause as material witnesses.” At the time, police departments across the state were abusing the statute, keeping possible witnesses just because they were worried they wouldn't be able to find them again later if they let them walk away. They would do this even without the evidence which would be needed to support a valid arrest. The guidelines created as a result of this case were intended to prevent that practice from continuing.

=== Tomkins v. Public Services Electric & Gas Company ===
Tomkins was a groundbreaking case because the 1977 decision stated that sexual harassment violated Title VII of the Civil Rights Act of 1964, protecting women in the workplace. The case was extensively discussed in law reviews and in media at the time. Since then it has continued to be widely cited by the courts. It is significant because "it was the first time public interest organizations officially became involved in a sexual harassment case and the first time explicitly sociological arguments were made in the briefs filed in a sexual harassment case."

Taub took on the case in 1975, even before the actual term "sexual harassment" was used (it was later coined in 1975 during the first sexual harassment speak out in Ithaca, New York titled "Speak Out on Sexual Harassment of Women at Work"). The case helped create a foundation for the concept that sexism experienced by women in the workplace is harassment and that women can be legally protected from being victims to it.

The case was about Adrienne Tomkins, a stenographer whose boss gave her an ultimatum: have sex with him or lose her job. He made many threats against her and physically assaulted her. In order to defend her client, Taub argued that "sexual coercion in the workplace is a form of sex discrimination." Defining sexual coercion as sex discrimination specifically meant that the act violated the existing Civil Rights Act. Taub argued that Tomkins' boss' sexual demands were based on the stereotype of women as 'sex objects.' Initially, a lower court ruled against Tomkins, stating that the issue brought before the court was a private matter, not employment-related. The judge also stated that he was worried that if this legal protection for women existed, then there would be a flood of fake or trivial claims.

Taub appealed, writing a brief which extended her legal argument and developed her sex stereotyping theory. Taub argued that a long history of sexism and "the servile status women have suffered in former societies" meant that sexual harassment in the workplace has a disproportionate affect on women and makes it "uniquely disturbing" to them. She went further, noting how the progress society has made is endangered if women are not legally protected from sexual harassment in the workplace:

"Hopefully, women are also recognized as persons in their own right, valued according to individual capacity and achievement. But to make a woman's advancement on the job depend on her sexual acquiescence is to resurrect her former status as man's property or plaything. [...] To tolerate women being subjected to such conditions is to make a mockery of all the progress women have made in the last fifty years toward a fully human status."

In order to eventually win the case, Taub also recruited other feminist lawyers and organizations, such as the Equal Rights Advocates and the Mexican American Legal Defense and Education Fund, which both filed amicus curiae briefs. The federal government's Equal Employment Opportunity Commission also filed a brief in support of Tomkins.

=== Frank v. Ivy Club ===
In the spring of 1978, Sally Frank, a sophomore at Princeton, applied for membership to the all-male eating clubs. After being denied twice, she went to the Rutger's clinic for support. Taub took on the case, eventually winning, but it took over ten years. Her argument was based on the relationship between the eating clubs and the university itself, maintaining that they were places of "public accommodation." It was not until the early 1990s that the clubs were court ordered to admit women. Even in the 1980s the clubs were selling shirts featuring a picture of Frank's face, given a mustache and the slogan "Better Dead Than Coed."

=== Califano v. Goldfarb ===
Taub worked alongside the future Justice Ruth Bater Ginsberg in taking Califano v. Goldfarb all the way to the Supreme Court and winning in 1977. It ruled that a provision of the Social Security Act, which differentiated between widows and widowers on the basis of gender, was unconstitutional. The ruling amended the Social Security Act in order to eliminate the burden of proof for widowers and allow female wage earners equal protection.

== Writing ==
Taub co-authored many books and publications about women's rights and gender discrimination. Her books and legal arguments still used today as teaching materials in law schools across the US.

=== Select bibliography ===
- "Keeping Women in their Place: Stereotyping Per Se As a Form of Employment Discrimination". Boston College Law Review. 21 (2 Number 2 Article 3): 345–418. January 1, 1980.
- Co-authored with Anne Marie Boylan. Adult Domestic Violence: Constitutional, Legislative and Equitable Issues. Washington, D.C.: Legal Services Corporation Research Institute. 1981. p. 385.
- Co-authored with Wendy W. Willians. "Will Equality Require More Than Assimilation, Accommodation or Separation". Rutgers Law Review. 37. 1984–1985 – via HeinOnline.
- Co-authored with Sherrill Cohen. Cohen, Sherrill; Taub, Nadine, eds. (1989). Reproductive Laws for the 1990s. Humana Press. p. 472. doi:10.1007/978-1-4612-3710-5. ISBN 978-0-89603-157-9. S2CID 36868576.
- Co-authored with J. Ralph Lindgren. The Law of Sex Discrimination. West Publishing Company. 1993. ISBN 978-0495793229.
- Co-authored with Barbara Babcock, Deborah L. Rhode, Anne E. Freedman, Susan Ross, Wendy W. Williams, and Rhonda Copelon. Sex Discrimination and the Law: History, Practice, and Theory. Boston: Little, Brown. 1996. ISBN 978-0316074889.

== Personal life ==
Taub was married to Swedish mathematician, Olof B. Widlund.

== Death ==
After a decades long struggle with Langerhans cell histiocytosis, Taub died on June 16, 2020, in her home in Manhattan at 77 years old.

== Legacy ==
Along with many other feminist lawyers in the 1970s and 80s, Taub made legal history many times over. Nancy Stearn, a lawyer with the Center for Constitutional Rights who was instrumental in the fight to legalize abortion, remembered the working alongside Taub:

"There weren't many of us, and the field of women's rights law was only just developing [...] We all knew each other. We were among the young feminist progressive lawyers of our day, and it was a wonderful thing to have sisters doing what we were doing and believing what we believed."

Many of the legal protections for women in the US today are based on the foundation created in part by Taub.
