= The Little Book (Edwards novel) =

2008 novel by Selden Edwards

- Author: Selden Edwards
- Language: English
- Genre: Novel
- Publisher: Dutton
- Publication date: August 14, 2008
- Publication place: United States
- Media type: Print (Hardcover)
- ISBN: 978-0452295513

The Little Book is a New York Times best-selling novel by American writer Selden Edwards. Edwards began writing the novel in 1974, and it was published by Dutton in 2008.

== Background ==
In 1974, Edwards began the novel while working as a teacher in California. Over the next thirty years, he continued to write and revise the manuscript, repeatedly sending it to publishers and agents. Upon his retirement from teaching in 2003, Edwards worked with a freelance editor and spent another year on the book before submitting to Dutton, whose editors purchased it within four days.

== Plot ==
The Little Book follows the character of Wheeler Burden, a wealthy 80's rock idol that suddenly finds himself in 1897 Vienna. Wheeler quickly uses his knowledge of the late 19th century and a set of stolen clothes to fit in with the environment. Soon Wheeler has met not only Sigmund Freud but also his own father. However the mystery of Wheeler's time travel still remains, and his impact on fin-de-siècle Vienna may have deeper implications than he realized.

== Critical reception ==
Reception for The Little Book was very positive, with Publishers Weekly calling it “a sweet, wistful elegy to the fantastic promise and failed hopes of the 20th century.” USA Today, and the Courier-Journal also praised the book. Entertainment Weekly gave it a B+, with the Courier-Journal stating the book was "full of surprises". NPR's Maureen Corrigan described it as “a historical time travel fantasy that's an ideal late summer reading getaway, complete with screwball hidden identity plots and even lively background music…Edwards handles the hectic demands of a multistranded plot with deftness and humor.”

Sarah Rachel Egelman at bookreporter.com was more critical, saying "In the end, while much of what Edwards attempts in The Little Book is compelling, the main characters, especially Wheeler, seem to lack any real humanity." Anna Scott at The Guardian was positive, although noted the historical research was "too prominent," and Kirkus Reviews stated "Those who demand comprehension will be exasperated, but others willing to suspend disbelief might be enchanted."
