= Pulitzer Prize for General Nonfiction =

American award for nonfiction books

The Pulitzer Prize for General Nonfiction is one of the seven American Pulitzer Prizes that are awarded annually for the "Letters, Drama, and Music" category. The award is given to a nonfiction book written by an American author and published during the preceding calendar year that is ineligible for any other Pulitzer Prize. The Prize has been awarded since 1962; beginning in 1980, one to three finalists have been announced alongside the winner.

== Recipients ==
During the year 1969, 1973, 1986, and 2020, two winners were awarded the prize An additional one to three finalists have been announced alongside the winner beginning in 1980. Two authors have won multiple prizes: Barbara W. Tuchman in 1963 and 1972, and Edward O. Wilson in 1979 and 1991. Additionally, two authors have been finalists multiple times: Steven Pinker (1998, 2003) and John McPhee (1982, 1987, 1991); McPhee won the Prize in 1999. Three winning works were also finalists for the Pulitzer Prize for History: A Bright Shining Lie: John Paul Vann and America in Vietnam by Neil Sheehan (1989), Lincoln at Gettysburg: The Words That Remade America by Garry Wills (1993), and The End of the Myth: From the Frontier to the Border Wall in the Mind of America by Greg Grandin (2020).

Year	Author(s)	Book	Publisher	Rationale
1962	Theodore H. White	The Making of the President 1960	Atheneum	
1963	Barbara W. Tuchman	The Guns of August	Macmillan	
1964	Richard Hofstadter	Anti-Intellectualism in American Life	Random House	
1965	Howard Mumford Jones	O Strange New World: American Culture: The Formative Years	Viking	
1966	Edwin Way Teale	Wandering through Winter: A Naturalist's Record of a 20,000-Mile Journey through the North American Winter	Dodd	
1967	David Brion Davis	The Problem of Slavery in Western Culture	Cornell University Press	
1968	Ariel Durant	The Story of Civilization: Rousseau and Revolution	Simon and Schuster	
1968	Will Durant	The Story of Civilization: Rousseau and Revolution	Simon and Schuster	
1969	René Dubos	So Human an Animal: How We Are Shaped by Surroundings and Events	Scribner	
1969	Norman Mailer	The Armies of the Night: History as a Novel, the Novel as History	World	
1970	Erik Erikson	Gandhi's Truth: On the Origins of Militant Nonviolence	W. W. Norton	
1971	John Toland	The Rising Sun: The Decline and Fall of the Japanese Empire, 1936–1945	Random House	
1972	Barbara W. Tuchman	Stilwell and the American Experience in China, 1911–1945	Macmillan	
1973	Robert Coles	Children of Crisis, Volumes II and III	Little	
1973	Frances FitzGerald	Fire in the Lake: The Vietnamese and the Americans in Vietnam	Little	
1974	Ernest Becker	The Denial of Death	Free Press	
1974	Ernest Becker	The Denial of Death	Macmillan	
1975	Annie Dillard	Pilgrim at Tinker Creek	Harper's Magazine Press	
1976	Robert N. Butler	Why Survive?: Being Old in America	Harper	
1977	William W. Warner	Beautiful Swimmers: Watermen, Crabs and the Chesapeake Bay	Little	
1978	Carl Sagan	The Dragons of Eden: Speculations on the Evolution of Human Intelligence	Random House	
1979	Edward O. Wilson	On Human Nature	Harvard University Press	
1980	Douglas Hofstadter	Gödel, Escher, Bach: An Eternal Golden Braid	Basic Books	
1980	Sandra Gilbert	The Madwoman in the Attic: The Woman Writer and the Nineteenth-Century Literary Imagination	Yale University Press	
1980	Susan Gubar	The Madwoman in the Attic: The Woman Writer and the Nineteenth-Century Literary Imagination	Yale University Press	
1980	Lewis Thomas	The Medusa and the Snail: More Notes of a Biology Watcher	Viking	
1981	Carl E. Schorske	Fin-de-Siècle Vienna: Politics and Culture	Knopf	
1981	Marshall Frady	Southerners: A Journalist's Odyssey	New American Library	
1981	Maxine Hong Kingston	China Men	Knopf	
1981	William Manchester	Goodbye, Darkness: A Memoir of the Pacific War	Little	
1982	Tracy Kidder	The Soul of a New Machine	Atlantic	
1982	Tracy Kidder	The Soul of a New Machine	Little	
1982	John McPhee	Basin and Range	Farrar, Straus and Giroux	
1982	Diana Trilling	Mrs. Harris: The Death of the Scarsdale Diet Doctor	Harcourt	
1983	Susan Sheehan	Is There No Place on Earth for Me?	Houghton Mifflin	
1983	Diane Johnson	Terrorists and Novelists	Knopf	
1983	Jonathan Schell	The Fate of the Earth	Knopf	
1984	Paul Starr	The Social Transformation of American Medicine	Basic Books	
1984	Winston Groom	Conversations with the Enemy	Putnam	
1984	Duncan Spencer	Conversations with the Enemy	Putnam	
1984	Susan Jacoby	Wild Justice	Harper	
1985	Studs Terkel	"The Good War": An Oral History of World War II	Pantheon	
1985	Donald Keene	Dawn to the West: Japanese Literature in the Modern Era	Holt	
1985	Jonathan Kwitny	Endless Enemies: The Making of an Unfriendly World	Congdon and Weed	
1986	Joseph Lelyveld	Move Your Shadow: South Africa, Black and White	Times Books	
1986	J. Anthony Lukas	Common Ground: A Turbulent Decade in the Lives of Three American Families	Knopf	
1986	Robert N. Bellah	Habits and the Heart: Individualism and Commitment in American Life	University of California Press	
1987	David K. Shipler	Arab and Jew: Wounded Spirits in a Promised Land	Times Books	
1987	Cyra McFadden	Rain or Shine: A Family Memoir	Knopf	
1987	John McPhee	Rising from the Plains	Farrar, Straus and Giroux	
1988	Richard Rhodes	The Making of the Atomic Bomb	Simon and Schuster	
1988	Daniel Callahan	Setting Limits: Medical Goals in an Aging Society	Simon and Schuster	
1988	James Gleick	Chaos: Making a New Science	Viking	
1989	Neil Sheehan	A Bright Shining Lie: John Paul Vann and America in Vietnam	Random House	
1989	McGeorge Bundy	Danger and Survival: Choices about the Bomb in the First Fifty Years	Random House	
1989	Timothy Ferris	Coming of Age in the Milky Way	William Morrow	
1989	Howard Kohn	The Last Farmer	Summit Books	
1990	Dale Maharidge	And Their Children after Them	Pantheon	
1990	Michael Williamson	And Their Children after Them	Pantheon	
1990	David Fromkin	A Peace to End All Peace: Creating the Modern Middle East, 1914–1922	Holt	
1990	Stephen Jay Gould	Wonderful Life: The Burgess Shale and the Nature of History	W. W. Norton	
1991	Bert Hölldobler	The Ants	Harvard University Press (Belknap)	
1991	Edward O. Wilson	The Ants	Harvard University Press (Belknap)	
1991	William deBuys	River of Traps: A Village Life	University of New Mexico Press	
1991	Alex Harris	River of Traps: A Village Life	University of New Mexico Press	
1991	John McPhee	Looking for a Ship	Farrar, Straus and Giroux	
1992	Daniel Yergin	The Prize: The Epic Quest for Oil, Money, and Power	Simon and Schuster	
1992	Andre Dubus	Broken Vessels	Godine	
1992	Mary Edsall	Chain Reaction: The Impact of Race, Rights, and Taxes on American Politics	W. W. Norton	
1992	Thomas B. Edsall	Chain Reaction: The Impact of Race, Rights, and Taxes on American Politics	W. W. Norton	
1993	Garry Wills	Lincoln at Gettysburg: The Words That Remade America	Simon and Schuster	
1993	Susan Griffin	A Chorus of Stones: The Private Life of War	Doubleday	
1993	Anne Matthews	Where the Buffalo Roam: Restoring America's Great Plains	Grove	
1993	Richard Rodriguez	Days of Obligation: An Argument with My Mexican Father	Viking	
1994	David Remnick	Lenin's Tomb: The Last Days of the Soviet Empire	Random House	
1994	Peter Gay	The Cultivation of Hatred: The Bourgeois Experience, Victoria to Freud	W. W. Norton	
1994	John Lukacs	The End of the Twentieth Century: And the End of the Modern Age	Ticknor and Fields	
1995	Jonathan Weiner	The Beak of the Finch: A Story of Evolution in Our Time	Knopf	
1995	John Berendt	Midnight in the Garden of Good and Evil: A Savannah Story	Random House	
1995	Sherwin B. Nuland	How We Die: Reflections on Life's Final Chapter	Knopf	
1996	Tina Rosenberg	The Haunted Land: Facing Europe's Ghosts after Communism	Random House	
1996	Daniel Dennett	Darwin's Dangerous Idea: Evolution and the Meanings of Life	Simon and Schuster	
1996	Lawrence Weschler	Mr. Wilson's Cabinet of Wonder: Pronged Ants, Horned Humans, Mice on Toast, and Other Marvels of Jurassic Technology	Pantheon	
1997	Richard Kluger	Ashes to Ashes: America's Hundred-Year Cigarette War, the Public Health, and the Unabashed Triumph of Philip Morris	Knopf	
1997	Samuel G. Freedman	The Inheritance: How Three Families and America Moved from Roosevelt to Reagan and Beyond	Simon and Schuster	
1997	Cynthia Ozick	Fame and Folly	Knopf	
1998	Jared Diamond	Guns, Germs, and Steel: The Fates of Human Societies	W. W. Norton	
1998	Jon Krakauer	Into Thin Air: A Personal Account of the Mount Everest Disaster	Villard	
1998	Steven Pinker	How the Mind Works	W. W. Norton	
1999	John McPhee	Annals of the Former World	Farrar, Straus and Giroux	
1999	Elliott Currie	Crime and Punishment in America	Metropolitan Books	
1999	Judith Rich Harris	The Nurture Assumption: Why Children Turn Out the Way They Do	Free Press	
2000	John W. Dower	Embracing Defeat: Japan in the Wake of World War II	New Press	
2000	John W. Dower	Embracing Defeat: Japan in the Wake of World War II	W. W. Norton	
2000	Brian Greene	The Elegant Universe: Superstrings, Hidden Dimensions, and the Quest for the Ultimate Theory	W. W. Norton	
2000	Scott Weidensaul	Living on the Wind: Across the Hemisphere with Migratory Birds	Farrar, Straus and Giroux	
2000	Scott Weidensaul	Living on the Wind: Across the Hemisphere with Migratory Birds	North Point Press	
2001	Herbert P. Bix	Hirohito and the Making of Modern Japan	HarperCollins	
2001	Ted Conover	Newjack: Guarding Sing Sing	Random House	
2001	Dave Eggers	A Heartbreaking Work of Staggering Genius	Simon and Schuster	
2002	Diane McWhorter	Carry Me Home: Birmingham, Alabama, the Climactic Battle of the Civil Rights Revolution	Simon and Schuster	
2002	David Halberstam	War in a Time of Peace: Bush, Clinton, and the Generals	Scribner	
2002	Andrew Solomon	The Noonday Demon: An Atlas of Depression	Scribner	
2003	Samantha Power	"A Problem from Hell": America and the Age of Genocide	Basic Books	
2003	Ellen Meloy	The Anthropology of Turquoise: Meditations on Landscape, Art, and Spirit	Pantheon	
2003	Steven Pinker	The Blank Slate: The Modern Denial of Human Nature	Viking	
2004	Anne Applebaum	Gulag: A History of the Soviet Camps	Doubleday	
2004	Steven Nadler	Rembrandt's Jews	University of Chicago Press	
2004	Dana Priest	The Mission: Waging War and Keeping Peace with America's Military	W. W. Norton	
2005	Steve Coll	Ghost Wars: The Secret History of the CIA, Afghanistan, and Bin Laden, from the Soviet Invasion to September 10, 2001	Penguin	
2005	Suketu Mehta	Maximum City: Bombay Lost and Found	Knopf	
2005	Luis Alberto Urrea	The Devil's Highway: A True Story	Little	
2006	Caroline Elkins	Imperial Reckoning: The Untold Story of Britain's Gulag in Kenya	Holt	
2006	Tony Judt	Postwar: A History of Europe since 1945	Penguin	
2006	George Packer	The Assassins' Gate: America in Iraq	Farrar, Straus and Giroux	
2007	Lawrence Wright	The Looming Tower: Al-Qaeda and the Road to 9/11	Knopf	
2007	Pete Earley	Crazy: A Father's Search through America's Mental Health Madness	Putnam	
2007	Thomas E. Ricks	Fiasco: The American Military Adventure in Iraq	Penguin	
2008	Saul Friedländer	The Years of Extermination: Nazi Germany and the Jews, 1939–1945	HarperCollins	
2008	Allan Brandt	The Cigarette Century: The Rise, Fall, and Deadly Persistence of the Product That Defined America	Basic Books	
2008	Alex Ross	The Rest Is Noise: Listening to the Twentieth Century	Farrar, Straus and Giroux	
2009	Douglas A. Blackmon	Slavery by Another Name: The Re-Enslavement of Black Americans from the Civil War to World War II	Doubleday	"A precise and eloquent work that examines a deliberate system of racial suppression and that rescues a multitude of atrocities from virtual obscurity."
2009	Arthur Herman	Gandhi and Churchill: The Epic Rivalry That Destroyed an Empire and Forged Our Age	Bantam Books	"An authoritative, deeply researched book that achieves an extraordinary balance in weighing two mighty protagonists against each other."
2009	William I. Hitchcock	The Bitter Road to Freedom: A New History of the Liberation of Europe	Free Press	"A heavily documented exploration of the overlooked suffering of noncombatants in the victory over Nazi Germany, written with the dash of a novelist and the authority of a scholar."
2010	David E. Hoffman	The Dead Hand: The Untold Story of the Cold War Arms Race and Its Dangerous Legacy	Doubleday	"A well documented narrative that examines the terrifying doomsday competition between two superpowers and how weapons of mass destruction still imperil humankind."
2010	John Cassidy	How Markets Fail: The Logic of Economic Calamities	Farrar, Straus and Giroux	"A work that probes the complexity of the Great Recession, using solid research and precise documentation to reveal not only a gripping human drama but also a tense clash of ideas."
2010	Robert Wright	The Evolution of God	Little	"A sweeping look at the origins and development of religious belief throughout human history."
2011	Siddhartha Mukherjee	The Emperor of All Maladies: A Biography of Cancer	Scribner	"An elegant inquiry, at once clinical and personal, into the long history of an insidious disease that, despite treatment breakthroughs, still bedevils medical science."
2011	Nicholas G. Carr	The Shallows: What the Internet Is Doing to Our Brains	W. W. Norton	"A thought provoking exploration of the Internet's physical and cultural consequences, rendering highly technical material intelligible to the general reader."
2011	S. C. Gwynne	Empire of the Summer Moon: Quanah Parker and the Rise and Fall of the Comanches, the Most Powerful Indian Tribe in American History	Scribner	"A memorable examination of the longest and most brutal of all the wars between European settlers and a single Indian tribe."
2012	Stephen Greenblatt	The Swerve: How the World Became Modern	W. W. Norton	"A provocative book arguing that an obscure work of philosophy, discovered nearly 600 years ago, changed the course of history by anticipating the science and sensibilities of today."
2012	Diane Ackerman	One Hundred Names for Love: A Stroke, a Marriage, and the Language of Healing	W. W. Norton	"A resilient author's account of caring for a stricken husband, sharing fears and insights as she explores neurology and ponders the gift of words."
2012	Mara Hvistendahl	Unnatural Selection: Choosing Boys over Girls, and the Consequences of a World Full of Men	PublicAffairs	"An evocative, deeply researched book probing the causes and effects of a global imbalance in the gender ratio."
2013	Gilbert King	Devil in the Grove: Thurgood Marshall, the Groveland Boys, and the Dawn of a New America	Harper	"A richly detailed chronicle of racial injustice in the Florida town of Groveland in 1949, involving four black men falsely accused of rape and drawing a civil rights crusader, and eventual Supreme Court justice, into the legal battle."
2013	Katherine Boo	Behind the Beautiful Forevers: Life, Death and Hope in a Mumbai Undercity	Random House	"An engrossing book that plunges the reader into an Indian slum in the shadow of gleaming hotels near Mumbai's airport, revealing a complex subculture where poverty does not extinguish aspiration."
2013	David G. Haskell	The Forest Unseen: A Year's Watch in Nature	Viking	"A fascinating book that, for a year, closely follows the natural wonders occurring within a tiny patch of old-growth Tennessee forest."
2014	Dan Fagin	Toms River: A Story of Science and Salvation	Bantam Books	"A book that deftly combines investigative reporting and historical research to probe a New Jersey seashore town's cluster of childhood cancers linked to water and air pollution."
2014	Gary J. Bass	The Blood Telegram: Nixon, Kissinger, and a Forgotten Genocide	Knopf	"A disquieting exploration of the role played by the American president and his national security advisor in the 1971 Pakistani civil war, a bloodbath that killed hundreds of thousands and created millions of refugees."
2014	Fred Kaplan	The Insurgents: David Petraeus and the Plot to Change the American Way of War	Simon and Schuster	"An engrossing look at how a tenacious general became the ringleader of efforts to reshape America's military strategy in the post-Cold War age."
2015	Elizabeth Kolbert	The Sixth Extinction: An Unnatural History	Holt	"An exploration of nature that forces readers to consider the threat posed by human behavior to a world of astonishing diversity."
2015	Anand Gopal	No Good Men among the Living: America, the Taliban, and the War through Afghan Eyes	Metropolitan Books	"A remarkable work of nonfiction storytelling that exposes the cascade of blunders that doomed America's misbegotten intervention in Afghanistan."
2015	Evan Osnos	Age of Ambition: Chasing Fortune, Truth, and Faith in the New China	Farrar, Straus and Giroux	"The story of a vast country and society in the grip of transformation, calmly surveyed, smartly reported and portrayed with exacting strokes."
2016	Joby Warrick	Black Flags: The Rise of ISIS	Doubleday	"A deeply reported book of remarkable clarity showing how the flawed rationale for the Iraq War led to the explosive growth of the Islamic State."
2016	Ta-Nehisi Coates	Between the World and Me	Spiegel and Grau	"A powerful book that passionately and bleakly propounds the hazards faced by black men coming of age in America."
2016	Carla Power	If the Oceans Were Ink: An Unlikely Friendship and a Journey to the Heart of the Quran	Holt	"A perceptive account of a year spent reading the Quran, displaying grace, subtlety and humane intellect as antidotes to rampant Islamophobia."
2017	Matthew Desmond	Evicted: Poverty and Profit in the American City	Crown	"For a deeply researched exposé that showed how mass evictions after the 2008 economic crash were less a consequence than a cause of poverty."
2017	John Donvan	In a Different Key: The Story of Autism	Crown	"For a passionate work of advocacy that traces public perceptions about autism from chillingly cruel beginnings to a kinder but still troubling present."
2017	Caren Zucker	In a Different Key: The Story of Autism	Crown	"For a passionate work of advocacy that traces public perceptions about autism from chillingly cruel beginnings to a kinder but still troubling present."
2017	Micki McElya	The Politics of Mourning: Death and Honor in Arlington National Cemetery	Harvard University Press	"For a luminous investigation of how policies and practices at Arlington National Cemetery have mirrored the nation's fierce battles over race, politics, honor and loyalty."
2018	James Forman Jr.	Locking Up Our Own: Crime and Punishment in Black America	Farrar, Straus and Giroux	"An examination of the historical roots of contemporary criminal justice in the U.S., based on vast experience and deep knowledge of the legal system, and its often-devastating consequences for citizens and communities of color."
2018	Suzy Hansen	Notes on a Foreign Country: An American Abroad in a Post-America World	Farrar, Straus and Giroux	"A brave and disturbing account of what it means to be an American in the world during the first decades of the 21st century."
2018	Richard Prum	The Evolution of Beauty: How Darwin's Forgotten Theory of Mate Choice Shapes the Animal World—and Us	Doubleday	"A fascinating, nuanced and compelling account of the potentially unsettling implications surrounding sexual selection."
2019	Eliza Griswold	Amity and Prosperity: One Family and the Fracturing of America	Farrar, Straus and Giroux	"A classic American story, grippingly told, of an Appalachian family struggling to retain its middle class status in the shadow of destruction wreaked by corporate fracking."
2019	Elizabeth Rush	Rising: Dispatches from the New American Shore	Milkweed Editions	"A rigorously reported story about American vulnerability to rising seas, particularly disenfranchised people with limited access to the tools of rebuilding."
2019	Bernice Yeung	In a Day's Work: The Fight to End Sexual Violence against America's Most Vulnerable Workers	New Press	"An unembellished series of case studies about sexual violence exacted on mostly immigrant women in America, many toiling in a shadow economy."
2020	Anne Boyer	The Undying: Pain, Vulnerability, Mortality, Medicine, Art, Time, Dreams, Data, Exhaustion, Cancer, and Care	Farrar, Straus and Giroux	"An elegant and unforgettable narrative about the brutality of illness and the capitalism of cancer care in America."
2020	Greg Grandin	The End of the Myth: From the Frontier to the Border Wall in the Mind of America	Metropolitan Books	"A sweeping and beautifully written book that probes the American myth of boundless expansion and provides a compelling context for thinking about the current political moment." (Note: Moved by the Pulitzer board from the History category.)
2020	Louise Aronson	Elderhood: Redefining Aging, Transforming Medicine, Reimagining Life	Bloomsbury	"An empathetic and nuanced critique, informed by the author's decades of experience as a geriatrician, of the ways in which our society and healthcare system neglect, stereotype and mistreat the elderly."
2020	Leslie George	Solitary	Grove Atlantic	"An unflinching indictment of Louisiana's most notorious prison and the racist criminal justice system as told through an innocent man's redemptive journey faced with a life sentence in solitary confinement."
2020	Albert Woodfox	Solitary	Grove Atlantic	"An unflinching indictment of Louisiana's most notorious prison and the racist criminal justice system as told through an innocent man's redemptive journey faced with a life sentence in solitary confinement."
2021	David Zucchino	Wilmington's Lie: The Murderous Coup of 1898 and the Rise of White Supremacy	Atlantic Monthly Press	"A gripping account of the overthrow of the elected government of a Black-majority North Carolina city after Reconstruction that untangles a complicated set of power dynamics cutting across race, class and gender."
2021	Sierra Crane Murdoch	Yellow Bird: Oil, Murder, and a Woman's Search for Justice in Indian Country	Random House	"A richly-layered story with an imperfect yet memorable protagonist battling corruption, greed and intergenerational trauma when a fracking oil boom collides with reservation life in North Dakota."
2021	Cathy Park Hong	Minor Feelings: An Asian American Reckoning	One World	"A captivating and insightful essay collection that provides an emotional consideration of racial consciousness, compelling readers to interrogate their own ideas about our common humanity."
2021	Cathy Park Hong	Minor Feelings: An Asian American Reckoning	Random House	"A captivating and insightful essay collection that provides an emotional consideration of racial consciousness, compelling readers to interrogate their own ideas about our common humanity."
2022	Andrea Elliott	Invisible Child: Poverty, Survival and Hope in an American City	Random House	"An affecting, deeply reported account of a girl who comes of age during New York City's homeless crisis—a portrait of resilience amid institutional failure that successfully merges literary narrative with policy analysis."
2022	Carla Power	Home, Land, Security: Deradicalization and the Journey Back from Extremism	One World	"An eye-opening global investigation into the deradicalization of violent extremists that impeccably balances empathy and skepticism."
2022	Carla Power	Home, Land, Security: Deradicalization and the Journey Back from Extremism	Random House	"An eye-opening global investigation into the deradicalization of violent extremists that impeccably balances empathy and skepticism."
2022	Joshua Prager	The Family Roe: An American Story	W. W. Norton	"A deeply reported account of Norma McCorvey, the Roe of Roe v. Wade, and her family, which casts fresh light on the American judicial system's half century of struggle to reckon with abortion."
2023	Toluse Olorunnipa	His Name Is George Floyd: One Man's Life and the Struggle for Racial Justice	Viking	"An intimate, riveting portrait of an ordinary man whose fatal encounter with police officers in 2020 sparked an international movement for social change, but whose humanity and complicated personal story were unknown." (Note: Moved by the Pulitzer board from the Biography category.)
2023	Robert Samuels	His Name Is George Floyd: One Man's Life and the Struggle for Racial Justice	Viking	"An intimate, riveting portrait of an ordinary man whose fatal encounter with police officers in 2020 sparked an international movement for social change, but whose humanity and complicated personal story were unknown."
2023	David G. Haskell	Sounds Wild and Broken: Sonic Marvels, Evolution's Creativity, and the Crisis of Sensory Extinction	Viking	"An insightful and revelatory work that scientifically reconsiders natural sound as a wonder of evolution, voicing concern that noisy human progress may return us to silence."
2023	Jing Tsu	Kingdom of Characters: The Language Revolution That Made China Modern	Riverhead Books	"A beguiling and original geopolitical account of how China's international prominence was made possible by the preservation and modernization of the Chinese language and the integration of Mandarin into global communication."
2023	Linda Villarosa	Under the Skin: The Hidden Toll of Racism on American Lives and on the Health of Our Nation	Doubleday	"A morally urgent and elegantly rendered work drawing on history, medical research and years of reporting to document how racism infects the American healthcare system, a call to action that also offers some solutions."
2024	Nathan Thrall	A Day in the Life of Abed Salama: Anatomy of a Jerusalem Tragedy	Metropolitan Books	"A finely reported and intimate account of life under Israeli occupation of the West Bank, told through a portrait of a Palestinian father whose five-year-old son dies in a fiery school bus crash when Israeli and Palestinian rescue teams are delayed by security regulations."
2024	Siddharth Kara	Cobalt Red: How the Blood of the Congo Powers Our Lives	St. Martin's Press	"A powerful examination of mining operations in the Southeastern Congo that reveals a global system of modern-day slavery, and the inhumane, often deadly working conditions for the men, women and children who extract the rare metal required for smartphones, computers and electric vehicles."
2024	John Vaillant	Fire Weather: A True Story from a Hotter World	Knopf	"An unsparing account of the rapacious Alberta Sands fire, fueled by an overheated atmosphere, dry forest and omnipresent petroleum products, that consumed the town of Fort McMurray at the heart of Canada's oil industry, which brings the global crisis of carbon emissions and climate change into urgent relief."
2025	Benjamin Nathans	To the Success of Our Hopeless Cause: The Many Lives of the Soviet Dissident Movement	Princeton University Press	"A prodigiously researched and revealing history of Soviet dissent, how it was repeatedly put down and came to life again, populated by a sprawling cast of courageous people dedicated to fighting for threatened freedoms and hard-earned rights."
2025	Rachel Nolan	Until I Find You: Disappeared Children and Coercive Adoptions in Guatemala	Harvard University Press	"A focused, extensively reported study of how, between 1977 and 2007, Guatemala became the second largest source of foreign adoptions in the world, a breeding ground for racism, greed and exploitation."
2025	Rollo Romig	I Am on the Hit List: A Journalist's Murder and the Rise of Autocracy in India	Penguin	"A captivating account of a crusading South Indian's murder, a mystery rich in local culture and politics that also connects to such global themes as authoritarianism, fundamentalism and other threats to free expression."
2026	Brian Goldstone	There Is No Place for Us: Working and Homeless in America	Crown	"A feat of reportage, analysis and storytelling focusing on the issues that have created a national crisis of family homelessness among the so-called working poor."
2026	Haley Cohen Gilliland	A Flower Traveled in My Blood: The Incredible True Story of the Grandmothers Who Fought to Find a Stolen Generation of Children	Avid Reader Press	"A beautifully written and well-reported book on Argentina's Dirty War, told through the eyes of the mothers and grandmothers who sought the truth about what happened to their “disappeared” loved ones and raised awareness of political repression in South America."
2026	Haley Cohen Gilliland	A Flower Traveled in My Blood: The Incredible True Story of the Grandmothers Who Fought to Find a Stolen Generation of Children	Simon and Schuster	"A beautifully written and well-reported book on Argentina's Dirty War, told through the eyes of the mothers and grandmothers who sought the truth about what happened to their “disappeared” loved ones and raised awareness of political repression in South America."
2026	Kevin Sack	Mother Emanuel: Two Centuries of Race, Resistance, and Forgiveness in One Charleston Church	Crown	"A sensitive exploration of a church massacre in Charleston, South Carolina, a rigorously researched and reported story of faith, African American institutions, the legacy of slavery and what remains after devastating losses."

== See also ==
- Pulitzer Prize for Biography or Autobiography
- Pulitzer Prize for History
