= 1976 Pulitzer Prize =

Awards for journalism and related fields

The following are the Pulitzer Prizes for 1976.

== Journalism awards ==
- Public Service:
  - The Anchorage Daily News, for its disclosures of the impact and influence of the Teamsters Union on Alaska's economy and politics.
- Local General or Spot News Reporting:
  - Gene Miller of The Miami Herald, for his persistent and courageous reporting over eight and one-half years that led to the exoneration and release of two men who had twice been tried for murder and wrongfully convicted and sentenced to death in Florida.
- Local Investigative Specialized Reporting:
  - Staff of the Chicago Tribune, for uncovering widespread abuses in Federal housing programs in Chicago and exposing shocking conditions at two private Chicago hospitals.
- National Reporting:
  - James V. Risser of the Des Moines Register, for disclosing large-scale corruption in the American grain exporting trade.
- International Reporting:
  - Sydney Schanberg of The New York Times, for his coverage of the Communist takeover in Cambodia, carried out at great risk when he elected to stay at his post after the fall of Phnom Penh.
- Commentary:
  - Walter Wellesley Smith of The New York Times, for his commentary on sports in 1975 and for many other years.
- Criticism:
  - Alan M. Kriegsman of The Washington Post, for his critical writing about the dance during 1975.
- Editorial Writing:
  - Philip P. Kerby of the Los Angeles Times, for his editorials against government secrecy and judicial censorship.
- Editorial Cartooning:
  - Tony Auth of The Philadelphia Inquirer, for O beautiful for spacious skies, For amber waves of grain, published on July 22, 1975.
- Spot News Photography:
  - Stanley Forman of the Boston Herald American, for his sequence of photographs of a fire in Boston on July 22, 1975.
- Feature Photography:
  - Photographic Staff of the Louisville Courier-Journal and The Louisville Times, for a comprehensive pictorial report on busing in Louisville's schools.

== Letters, drama and music awards ==
- Fiction:
  - Humboldt's Gift by Saul Bellow (Viking)
- Drama:
  - A Chorus Line conceived, choreographed and directed by Michael Bennett, with book by James Kirkwood and Nicholas Dante, music by Marvin Hamlisch, and lyrics by Edward Kleban.
- History:
  - Lamy of Santa Fe by Paul Horgan (Farrar)
- Biography or Autobiography:
  - Edith Wharton: A Biography by R. W. B. Lewis (Harper)
- Poetry:
  - Self-portrait in a Convex Mirror by John Ashbery (Viking)
- General Nonfiction:
  - Why Survive? Being Old In America, by Robert Neil Butler (Harper)
- Music:
  - Air Music by Ned Rorem (Boosey & Hawkes)
    First performed by the Cincinnati Symphony Orchestra on December 5, 1975. It is subtitled Ten Etudes of Orchestra.

== Special citations and awards ==
- Journalism:
  - Professor John Hohenberg, a special citation and an antique plaque inscribed by all the members of the advisory board, expressing appreciation for his services for 22 years as Administrator of the Pulitzer Prizes and for his achievements as teacher and journalist.
- Music:
  - Scott Joplin, a special award is bestowed posthumously on Scott Joplin, in this Bicentennial Year, for his contributions to American music.
