= The End of the Myth =

2019 book by Greg Grandin

- Author: Greg Grandin
- Language: English
- Published: 2019
- Publisher: Henry Holt and Company
- ISBN: 978-1-250-17982-1

The End of the Myth: From the Frontier to the Border Wall in the Mind of America is a 2019 non-fiction book written by Greg Grandin about the role of the frontier in the United States from the time of the American Revolution to the presidential election of 2016. It won the Pulitzer Prize for General Nonfiction in 2020.

== Reception ==
The End of the Myth won a 2020 Pulitzer Prize for General Nonfiction, along with Anne Boyer's The Undying: Pain, Vulnerability, Mortality, Medicine, Art, Time, Dreams, Data, Exhaustion, Cancer, and Care.

Ben Ehrenreich described the work as "a powerful and painful book, clear-sighted, meticulous and damning". Benjamin H. Johnson described the book as "arresting and original".
