= 1965 Pulitzer Prize =

Awards for journalism and related fields

The following are the Pulitzer Prizes for 1965.

== Journalism awards ==
- Public Service:
  - The Hutchinson News, for its courageous and constructive campaign, culminating in 1964, to bring about more equitable reapportionment of the Kansas Legislature, despite powerful opposition in its own community.
- Local General or Spot News Reporting:
  - Melvin H. Ruder of the Hungry Horse News, a weekly in Columbia Falls, Montana, for his daring and resourceful coverage of a disastrous flood that threatened his community, an individual effort in the finest tradition of spot news reporting.
- Local Investigative Specialized Reporting:
  - Gene Goltz of the Houston Post, for his expose of government corruption in Pasadena, Texas, which resulted in widespread reforms.
- National Reporting:
  - Louis M. Kohlmeier of The Wall Street Journal, for his enterprise in reporting the growth of the fortune of President Lyndon B. Johnson and his family.
- International Reporting:
  - J. A. Livingston of the Philadelphia Bulletin, for his reports on the growth of economic independence among Russia's Eastern European satellites and his analysis of their desire for a resumption of trade with the West.
- Editorial Writing:
  - John R. Harrison of The Gainesville Sun, for his successful editorial campaign for better housing in his city.
- Editorial Cartooning:
  - No award given.
- Photography:
  - Horst Faas of the Associated Press, for his combat photography of the war in South Vietnam during 1964.
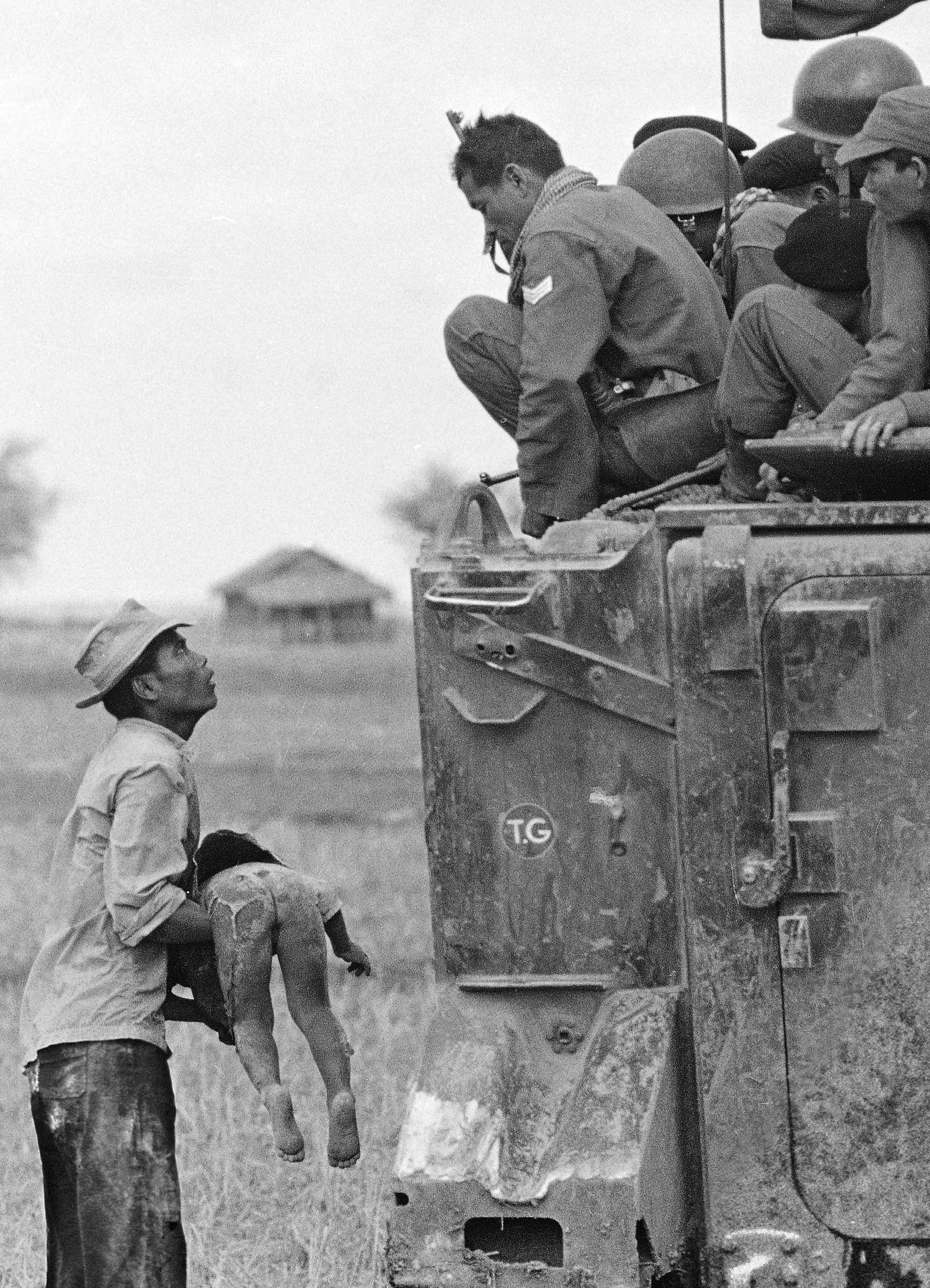
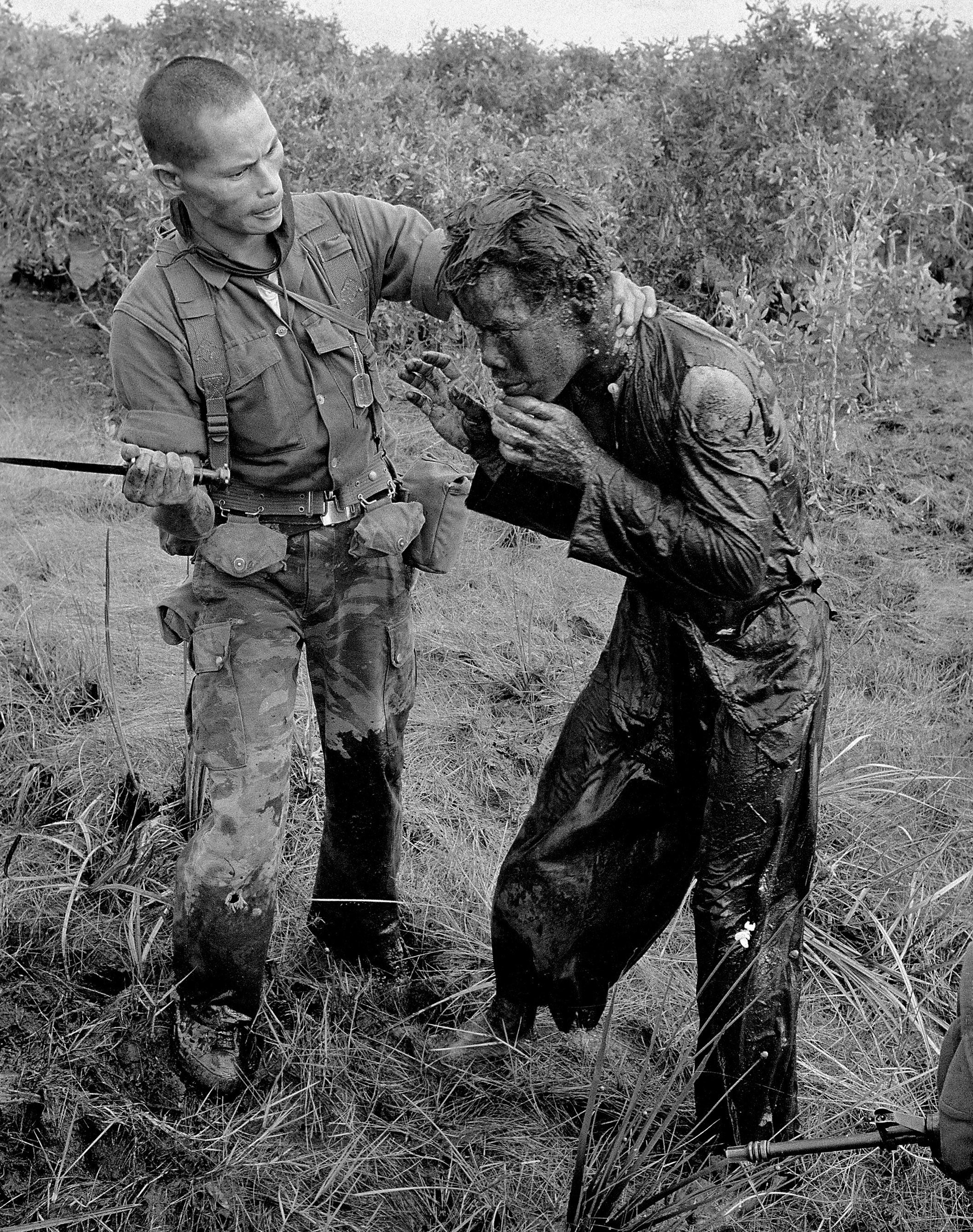
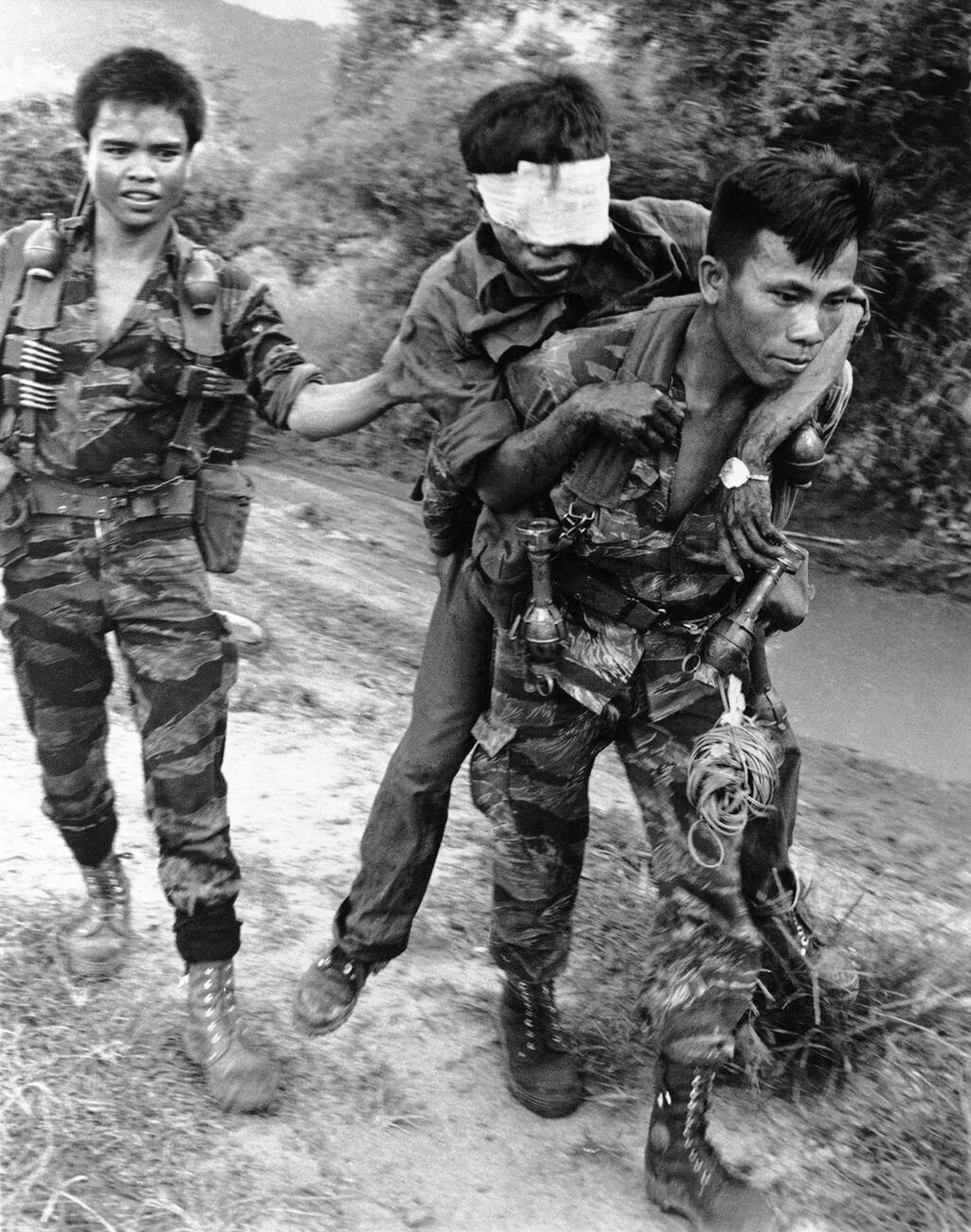
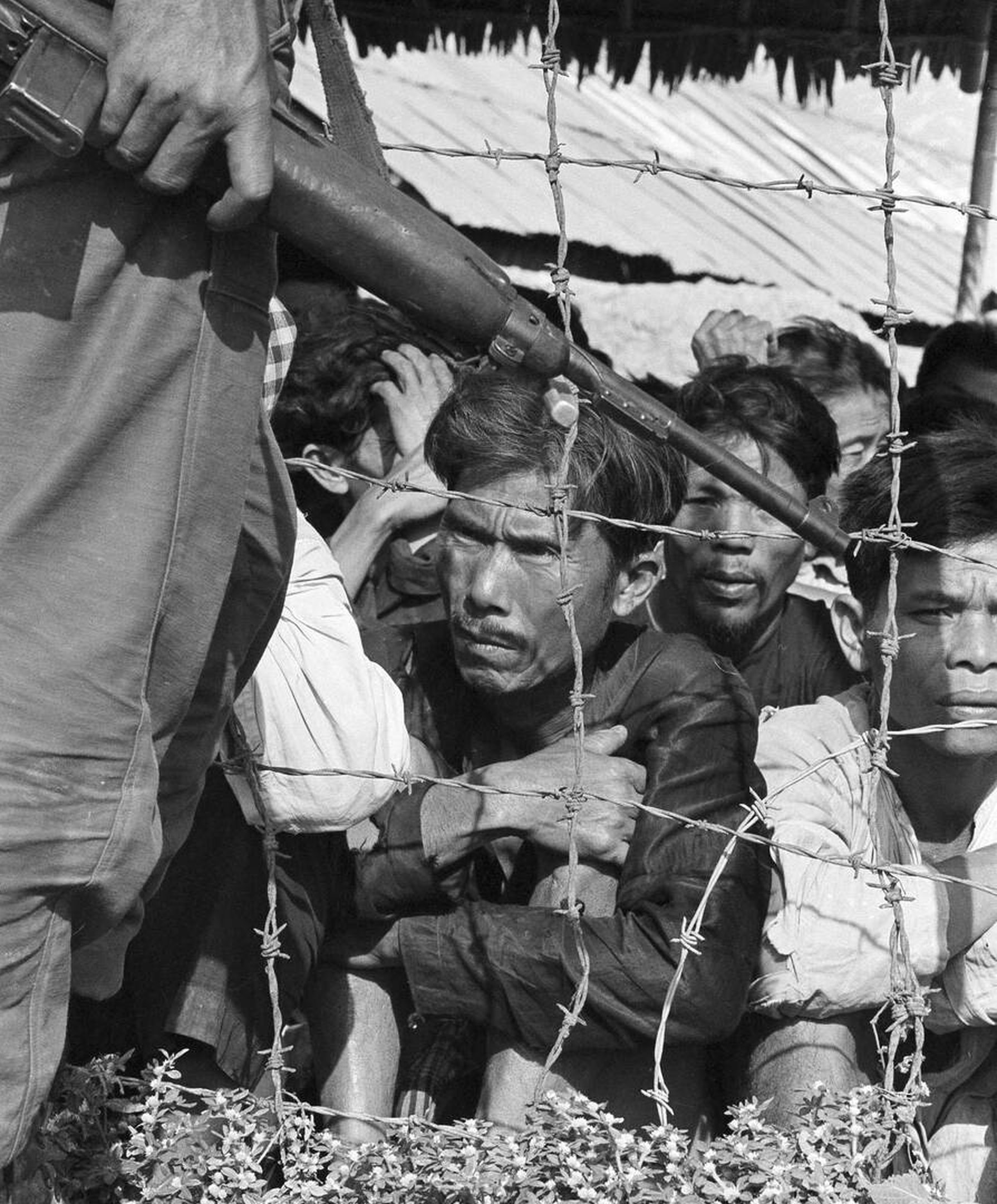
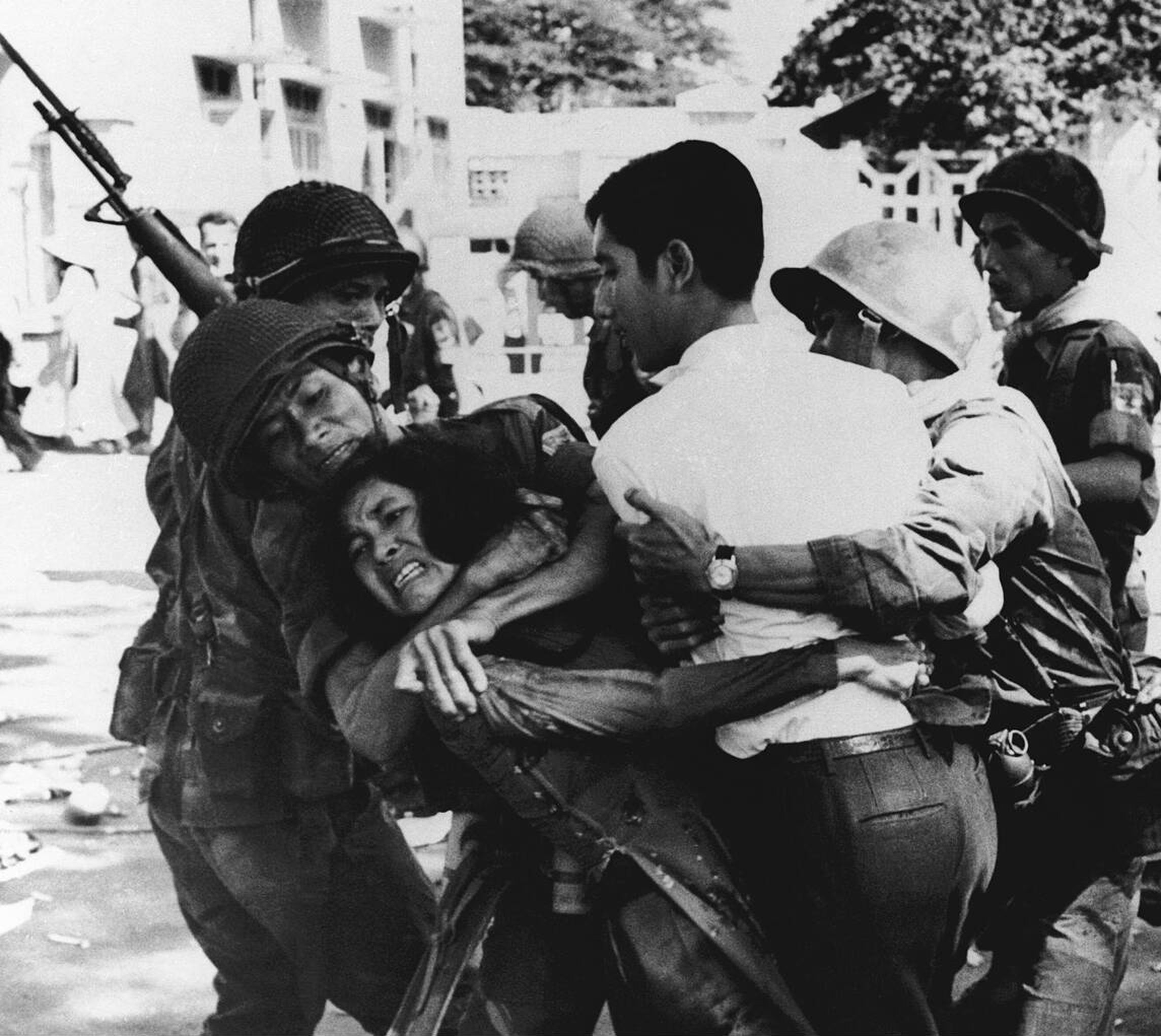
A selection of Horst Faas's prize-winning photographs of the Vietnam War

== Letters, Drama and Music Awards ==
- Fiction:
  - The Keepers of the House by Shirley Ann Grau (Random).
- Drama:
  - The Subject Was Roses by Frank D. Gilroy (Samuel French).
- History:
  - The Greenback Era by Irwin Unger (Princeton Univ. Press).
- Biography or Autobiography:
  - Henry Adams, three volumes by Ernest Samuels (Harvard Univ. Press).
- Poetry:
  - 77 Dream Songs by John Berryman (Farrar).
- General Nonfiction:
  - O Strange New World by Howard Mumford Jones (Viking).
- Music:
  - No award given.
