= The Nocturnists =

Independent medical storytelling program

The Nocturnists is an independent medical storytelling program of live performances, a podcast, and audio documentaries dedicated to humanizing healthcare workers. Founded in 2016 by Emily Silverman, an internal medicine physician at University of California, San Francisco (UCSF), The Nocturnists is based in San Francisco and hosts live performances across the United States where clinicians share stories from their personal and professional lives. The Nocturnists podcast features live stories, as well as podcast documentaries and conversations with authors and art makers whose work addresses moral and cultural issues in healthcare. The Nocturnists’ mission is to “provide a safe psychological space for health care workers to express themselves in their full-fledged humanity”. Since its founding, The Nocturnists has produced over twenty live events, five podcast seasons, and five special audio documentary series.

== Origins ==
The Nocturnists was founded by Emily Silverman, MD in 2016. Silverman worked as a hospital medicine physician at the Zuckerberg San Francisco General Hospital for four years before transitioning to outpatient primary care. She is a member of the COVID Crisis Group and co-author of Lessons from the Covid War. Her writing earned her a MacDowell Fellowship in 2018. In 2020 she was on the Yerba Buena Center for the Arts 100 List, which celebrates people whose work builds sustainable, equitable, and regenerative communities.

Silverman has described her motivations for The Nocturnists as using the art of storytelling to “make healthcare more humane and sustainable”. The Nocturnists began as Silverman’s blog and artistic outlet to share her experiences as a medical resident at UCSF. Shortly thereafter, Silverman adopted a live storytelling format, inspired by The Moth, to create a restorative community space for healthcare workers coping with high levels of stress and burnout. The Nocturnists was first launched as a house gathering for 40 people before becoming a podcast and live performance series with hundreds of audience members.

== Live events ==
The Nocturnists’ live performances feature healthcare workers who share personal and professional stories on a given theme in front of a live audience. Storytelling themes have included “Taking Care”, “Rebirth”, “Together Again”, “Transitions”, “Learning”, “Out of the Comfort Zone”, “Mistakes”, “Death & Dying”, “Health & Criminal Justice”, “Love”, “Diversity & Identity,” “Reproductive Health”, “Justice”, and “Wonder”. Stories from live events are featured and explored further in The Nocturnists podcast. The Nocturnists’ live performances have taken place in Minneapolis, San Francisco, New York City, and Boston, and have featured doctors, nurses, social workers, medical students, and others from across the United States.

== Podcast ==
The Nocturnists podcast launched in 2016 and ranks in the top 0.5% of all podcasts globally as of 2023. It has received multiple awards and nominations for the podcast as a whole, as well as for its Post-Roe America, Shame in Medicine: The Lost Forest, Conversations, and Black Voices in Healthcare series. The Nocturnists was nominated for Best Indie Podcast and Best Host at the 2024 Ambie Awards and was a Silver Winner in Health at the 2024 Anthem Awards. The Nocturnists podcast releases new episodes on Thursdays, and features two ongoing series – Stories from the World of Medicine (which is slated to begin its 6th season in 2024) and Conversations – as well as limited special series. Stories from the World of Medicine episodes feature original stories from The Nocturnists live performances and further discussions with the storytellers.

In the Conversations series, Silverman interviews artists and writers about moral and cultural issues in medicine. Guests have included Pulitzer Prize nominee Louise Aronson, MD, New York Times bestselling authors Janice Nimura and Michele Harper, MD, and Oscar-nominated filmmaker David France. The Nocturnists: Conversations series was a Webby Award Nominee for Best Interview/Talk Show alongside On Purpose with Jay Shetty and On with Kara Swisher. In September 2023, The Nocturnists received a major grant from the ABIM Foundation, Josiah Macy Jr. Foundation, and Gordon and Betty Moore Foundation to produce a new podcast documentary series with arts educator Alexa Miller on the theme of "Uncertainty in Medicine,” which is scheduled to begin production in early 2024.

=== Shame in Medicine: The Lost Forest Series ===
Shame in Medicine: The Lost Forest is a 10-part documentary podcast series that explores how shame manifests in medical culture. The series was released weekly for 10 weeks starting in September 2022. Shame in Medicine was created in partnership with Luna Dolezal, PhD and Will Bynum, MD, scholars who study shame in medicine at the University of Exeter and Duke University, respectively.^{,} The goal of the series was to develop a shared vocabulary about what shame is and how it works, and offer a space for healthcare workers to share experiences around shame, and improve medical culture. The series includes interviews with shame scholars and audio clips from more than 200 clinicians on themes including being sued, being bullied, making errors, getting sick, failing exams, being a parent, and having a broken childhood, disability, or mental illness. Shame in Medicine has received several awards, including Gold Winner in Best Health/Special Projects at the Anthem Awards in 2023, Silver Winner in Best Health/Medical Podcast at the New York Festivals Radio Awards in 2023, nominee for Best Health, Science, and Education podcast at the Webby Awards in 2023, and Winner for Media Leadership at the Sharp Index Awards in 2022. Dr. Silverman has called the series “a love letter to health care.”

=== Black Voices in Healthcare Series ===
Black Voices in Healthcare is a 10-part audio storytelling series hosted by Ashley McMullen, MD and executive produced by Kimberly Manning, MD that aired weekly beginning in June 2020. The series was produced to "highlight the experiences of Black health care workers – their joys, sorrows and everything in between" after the murder of George Floyd and the ensuing national protests, featuring themed episodes on topics related to race and racism. Over 200 Black healthcare workers including doctors, nurses, social workers, medical assistants, and hospital chaplains from across the United States participated in the project. The series included stories of racism in the workplace, Black joy, Black love, and Black excellence and was awarded Honoree for Best Diversity, Equity & Inclusion by the Webby Awards in 2021.

=== Stories from a Pandemic (Parts I and II) Series ===
The Stories from a Pandemic audio documentary storytelling series was released in two, 10-part installments. Part I (10 episodes) of the series was released weekly beginning in March 2020 and Part II (8 episodes) was released from June to July 2021. The series aired audio clips selected from over 700 audio diaries submitted by more than 200 healthcare workers across North America about their experiences grappling with the pandemic. The audio diaries from Stories from a Pandemic were acquired as a historical artifact by the U.S. Library of Congress in 2021.

=== Post-Roe America Series ===
Post-Roe America is a 7-part series hosted by The Nocturnists’ Executive Producer, family medicine physician, and abortion provider Ali Block. The series began airing on September 21, 2023 and was created in response to Dobbs v. Jackson Women’s Health Organization, the June 2022 supreme court ruling that overturned Roe v. Wade (1973) and Planned Parenthood v. Casey (1992), concluding that the Constitution does not protect the right to an abortion. The series features intimate conversations with abortion providers in states with bans or restrictions on abortion, including Tennessee, Texas, and Oklahoma, as well as states where abortion is still legal, including Ohio, New York, Nebraska, and Kansas.^{,} Episode themes include abortion providers’ reactions to the leak of the Dobbs draft opinion; impacts of the SB 8 law on clinicians in Texas; the Trust Women abortion clinic in Wichita, Kansas; the culture of silence around reproductive health in medical spaces; the impact of the Dobbs decision on clinicians, communities, and medical education; and future solutions for patients in need of abortions. The Post-Roe America series has been nominated for a 2023 Anthem Award in Health.

== Awards ==
Year	Nominated work	Category	Award	Result	Notes	Ref.
2024	The Nocturnists	Television and Audio Journalism Award	NIHCM Foundation Awards	Nominated	—	
2024	The Nocturnists: Post-Roe America	Radio Category	ABA Silver Gavel Awards	Won	—	
2024	The Nocturnists: Post-Roe America	Podcasts, Health, Science & Education	Webby Awards	Nominated	—	
2024	The Nocturnists	Best Indie Podcast	Ambie Awards	Nominated	—	
2024	The Nocturnists: Post-Roe America	Best Host	Ambie Awards	Nominated	Host: Ali Block	
2024	The Nocturnists: Post-Roe America	Podcast Category	Anthem Awards	Won	Silver	
2023	The Nocturnists: Conversations	Best Interview/Talk Show	Webby Awards	Nominated	—	
2023	The Nocturnists	Podcasts, Health, Science & Education	Webby Awards	Nominated	—	
2023	The Nocturnists: Shame in Medicine, The Lost Forest	Best Indie Podcast	Ambie Awards	Nominated	—	
2023	The Nocturnists: Shame in Medicine, The Lost Forest	Podcast Category	Anthem Awards	Won	Gold	
2023	The Nocturnists: Shame in Medicine, The Lost Forest	Podcast Category	New York Festivals Radio Award	Won	Silver	
2021	The Nocturnists: Black Voices in Healthcare	Diversity, Equity & Inclusion (Limited Series & Specials)	Webby Awards	Won	Honored	
