= Amity and Prosperity =

2018 nonfiction book

Amity and Prosperity: One Family and the Fracturing of America is a non-fiction book written by Eliza Griswold and published in 2018. It examines the social, environmental, and economic impact of the natural gas fracking industry on a small town in southwestern Pennsylvania.

== Synopsis ==
The book primarily focuses on the Haney family, particularly Stacey Haney and her children, as they deal with the consequences of fracking in their community. Griswold provides an intimate and in-depth look at how fracking operations affect the lives of ordinary people, from water contamination to health problems and legal battles. She also explores the broader implications of fracking on rural America, the environment, and the energy industry.

== Reception ==
The book won the Pulitzer Prize for General Nonfiction in 2019. The jury described the book as "a classic American story" and praised it as being "grippingly told".

The Los Angeles Review of Books called the work "thoroughly reported and tightly paced". A Kirkus review concluded that the work was a "solid addition to the burgeoning literature on the social and health-related effects of fracking." The book was also reviewed in The New York Times and The Nation.
