= A Day in the Life of Abed Salama =

2023 book by Nathan Thrall

A Day in the Life of Abed Salama: Anatomy of a Jerusalem Tragedy
- Author: Nathan Thrall
- Language: English
- Publisher: Macmillan Publishers
- Publication date: 2023
- Publication place: United States
- Pages: 272
- ISBN: 9781250291530

A Day in the Life of Abed Salama: Anatomy of a Jerusalem Tragedy is a 2023 book by journalist Nathan Thrall, published by Macmillan. The book details a 2012 road accident involving a school bus in which several Palestinian children and a teacher were killed. The book explores how a myriad of security measures including a separation wall and military checkpoints, forced segregation in the West Bank between Israeli Settlements and Palestinians, and bureaucratic limits on Palestinian citizens' freedom of movement led to long delays in emergency care for the children, obstacles which the author argues are entirely manmade. The book follows a father (Abed Salama) of one of the boys hurt in the accident as he searches for his son (Milad).

Thrall initially reported on the accident in a 2021 piece in the New York Review of Books and expanded upon the contents of the article into the 2023 book.

The book was awarded the 2024 Pulitzer Prize for General Non-fiction and was a finalist for the Orwell Prize for political literature.

== Narrative ==
The book details a 2012 road accident in which a school bus carrying Palestinian kindergartners and their teachers on Highway 60 collided with a lorry and overturned. The school bus caught fire and many of the occupants were severely burned. Six students and one teacher were killed in the accident. That stretch of Highway 60 was poorly maintained, and travelled mostly by Palestinians (with Israelis using a newly completed highway nearby). Despite an Israeli settlement being a few minutes away, emergency services were severely delayed in reaching the scene and ordinary citizens entered the burning bus to rescue victims and transported the injured to local hospitals in private vehicles. United Nations health workers as part of the UNRWA also attended to the victims, and eventually Israeli emergency workers. One of the children on the bus was 5-year-old Milad Salama who was taken to a local hospital and later died of his injuries. The narrative details his father's protracted attempts to find his son in the aftermath of the tragedy. Abed Salama did not have the blue identity card for Palestinians in the West Bank making navigating military checkpoints especially difficult.

The book explores the earlier life of Abed Salama, including his previous relationships and family life. It also details how Salama's life was shaped by the Israeli occupation of the West Bank and how many of his ambitions were destroyed by the Israeli government. During the First Intifada (Palestinian Uprising) of 1987-1993 the Israeli government closed Palestinian universities in the West Bank preventing Salama from attending college. He attempted to obtain a visa to study abroad but his application was denied by the Israeli government. Salama later joined the Democratic Front for the Liberation of Palestine and was arrested and tortured in 1989. He was represented in the military court by Israeli lawyer Lea Tsemel. Salama was convicted based on a third party statement documenting his illegal activities which he was not able to provide testimony during the case. Salama spent 6 months in Ketziot Prison. Thrall documents how the mass incarceration of Palestinians in the West Bank devastates the community; with children as young as 12 being jailed for offenses such as throwing stones at soldiers. Regarding the mass incarceration, Thrall noted that Palestinians facing military tribunals in the West Bank are convicted of crimes at a rate of 99.7% and that 700,000 Palestinians had been arrested during the occupation, representing 40% of all men and boys in the West Bank.

The book also documents the lives of other Palestinian parents who searched for their children on the tragic day as well as other Israelis and Palestinians connected by the tragedy. Thrall documents how endocrinologist Huda Dahbour, who was working at a nearby UNRWA mobile clinic, rushed to aid the victims of the tragedy. Thrall explained that her own son had been imprisoned by the Israeli government for throwing stones at IDF soldiers. Thrall also documents how some Israelis are working to improve relations with their Palestinian neighbors. Thrall describes how Adi Shpeter (from the Jewish settlement of Anatot) is working to improve relations with the Palestinian Authority by working with local representative Ibrahim Salama (Abed's cousin), how Israeli paramedic Edlad Benshtein had had his own past traumas unearthed after he tended to the accident victims, how Duli Yariv collected monetary donations to help the victims of the tragedy. Thrall concluded that the tragedy was a result of a system of forced segregation (separate roads, towns, schools), willful neglect of Palestinian infrastructure, denial of Palestinian rights including the militaristic denial of freedom of movement. Thrall concluded that the tragedy was preventable and a result of the oppressive system in which Palestinians live in.

== Reception ==
Writing for The New York Times Rozina Ali stated that Thrall was able to meticulously document the oppressive political system in which Palestinians live under without including political biases. Writing for The Guardian, Alex Preston stated that in the wake of the October 7 attacks and the Gaza war; "...a book such as A Day in the Life of Abed Salama brims over with just the sort of compassion and understanding that is needed at a time like this." Preston also stated that Thrall examined the Israeli-Palestinian conflict with nuance, comparing the reporting to Colum McCann's novel Apeirogon.
