= Louis M. Kohlmeier Jr. =

American journalist and teacher

Louis Martin Kohlmeier Jr.
- Born: February 17, 1926; St. Louis, Missouri
- Died: March 30, 2012 (aged 86); Huntersville, North Carolina
- Education: Bachelor of Arts, Journalism
- Alma mater: University of Missouri
- Occupations: Journalist, author, educator
- Spouse: Barbara Ann Wilson (m. 1958)
- Children: Daniel Kimbrell, Ann Werling
- Writing career
- Subjects: Rail transportation in the United States, national news
- Notable awards: Pulitzer Prize for National Reporting; 1965

Louis Martin Kohlmeier Jr. (February 17, 1926 – March 30, 2012) was an American author, journalist, and educator. He wrote for The Wall Street Journal and later for the Chicago Tribune-New York Daily News Syndicate; still later, he taught at American University. He won the Pulitzer Prize for National Reporting in 1965.

His 1956 statement in The Wall Street Journal that "Elvis Presley today is a business" has been widely quoted as an observation about the changing face of the American music industry in mid-century.

== Early life and education ==
Kohlmeier was born in St. Louis, Missouri, to Louis Martin Kohlmeier and Anita (Werling). He received a B.A. in journalism from the University of Missouri in 1950.

== Career ==
Kohlmeier served in the Merchant Marine during World War II and in the Army during the Korean War, from 1950 to 1952. He worked as a staff writer in the St. Louis and Chicago bureaus of the Wall Street Journal from 1952 to 1957. After a stint at the St. Louis Globe-Democrat between 1958 and 1959, he returned in 1960 to the Wall Street Journal as a staff writer in the newspaper's Washington, D.C., bureau. He covered the Supreme Court, the Department of Justice, and various executive branch departments and regulatory agencies.

In 1972, he left the Wall Street Journal. In 1973 he began writing a Washington column for the Chicago Tribune-New York Daily News Syndicate.

Beginning in 1977, he also served as Washington editor of Financier Magazine.

He later went on to become a professor at American University School of Communication.

== Books ==
Kohlmeier wrote The Regulators: Watchdog Agencies and the Public Interest (1969), God Save This Honorable Court: The Supreme Court Crisis (1972), and Conflicts of Interest: State and local pension fund asset management: report to the Twentieth Century Fund Steering Committee on Conflicts of Interest in the Securities Markets (1976).

He co-edited Reporting on Business and the Economy (1981) with Jon G. Udell and Laird B. Anderson.

== Honors and awards ==
In 1959, Kohlmeier won the National Headliners Club award for national reporting for a series of Globe-Democrat articles about railroad problems. He received the 1964 Sigma Delta Chi Award for exceptional Washington correspondent for a series of articles on the growth of the personal fortunes of President Johnson and his family.

In 1965, he received the Pulitzer Prize for National Reporting in recognition of the same series. After Kohlmeier's disclosures about the Johnson family finances, Johnson released a detailed personal audit on August 19, 1964.

== Personal life ==
Kolhmeier married Barbara Ann Wilson in 1958. They had two children, Daniel Kimbrell and Ann Werling. He died on March 30, 2012, in Huntersville, North Carolina.
