= Joby Warrick =

American journalist (born 1960)

- Born: August 4, 1960 (age 66); Goldsboro, North Carolina, U.S.
- Education: Temple University (BA)
- Occupation: Reporter
- Works: Black Flags: The Rise of ISIS
- Awards: 1996 Pulitzer Prize for Public Service (named contributor); 2016 Pulitzer Prize for General Nonfiction

Joby Warrick (born August 4, 1960) is an American journalist who has worked for The Washington Post since 1996, mostly writing about the Middle East, diplomacy, and national security. He has also written about the intelligence community, the proliferation of weapons of mass destruction and the environment, and has also served as a member of the Post's investigation branch. His work has been recognized with two Pulitzer Prizes.

== Career ==
Warrick was given the 2003 Bob Consadine Award for best interpretation of international affairs in a newspaper by the Overseas Press Club of America, for his articles about proliferation threats. In September 2002, Warrick was one of the first journalists to publish reports casting doubt on the Bush administration's claims that aluminum tubes discovered in Iraq were appropriate for use in uranium centrifuges.

Prior to his work at The Washington Post, Warrick reported for The News & Observer of Raleigh, North Carolina. The newspaper received the 1996 Pulitzer Prize for Public Service for a series of articles by Warrick, Melanie Sill and Pat Stith "on the environmental and health risks of waste disposal systems used in North Carolina's growing hog industry". The North Carolina native was previously an Eastern Europe correspondent for UPI and also worked for The Philadelphia Inquirer and the Delaware County Daily Times.

Warrick is the author of The Triple Agent: The al-Qaeda Mole who Infiltrated the CIA, a narrative culminating in the December 30, 2009, Camp Chapman attack in Afghanistan, which resulted in the murder of seven CIA employees by a suicide bomber. Warrick credits Bob Woodward for helping him structure the book's manuscript.

Warrick was awarded the 2016 Pulitzer Prize for General Nonfiction for his book Black Flags: The Rise of ISIS which recounts the characters and events behind the emergence of the Islamic State.

His third book, Red Line: The Unraveling of Syria and America's Race to Destroy the Most Dangerous Arsenal in the World is a narrative account of Syria's chemical-weapons crisis and the effort to remove the country's chemical weapons arsenal in the middle of a civil war.

== Personal life ==
An alumnus of Temple University, Warrick lives in Washington, D.C., and has two children with his wife Maryanne Jordan Warrick.

== Books ==
- The Triple Agent: The al-Qaeda Mole who Infiltrated the CIA. Doubleday. 2011. ISBN 978-0-385-53418-5.
- Black Flags: the Rise of ISIS. Doubleday. 2015. ISBN 978-0-385-53821-3.
- Red Line: The Unraveling of Syria and America's Race to Destroy the Most Dangerous Arsenal in the World. Doubleday. 2021. ISBN 978-0385544467.
- The Jackal: The Rise and Fall of Carlos, the World's First Super-Terrorist. Scribner. 2026. ISBN 978-1668070550.
