= Greg Grandin =

American historian and author (born 1962)

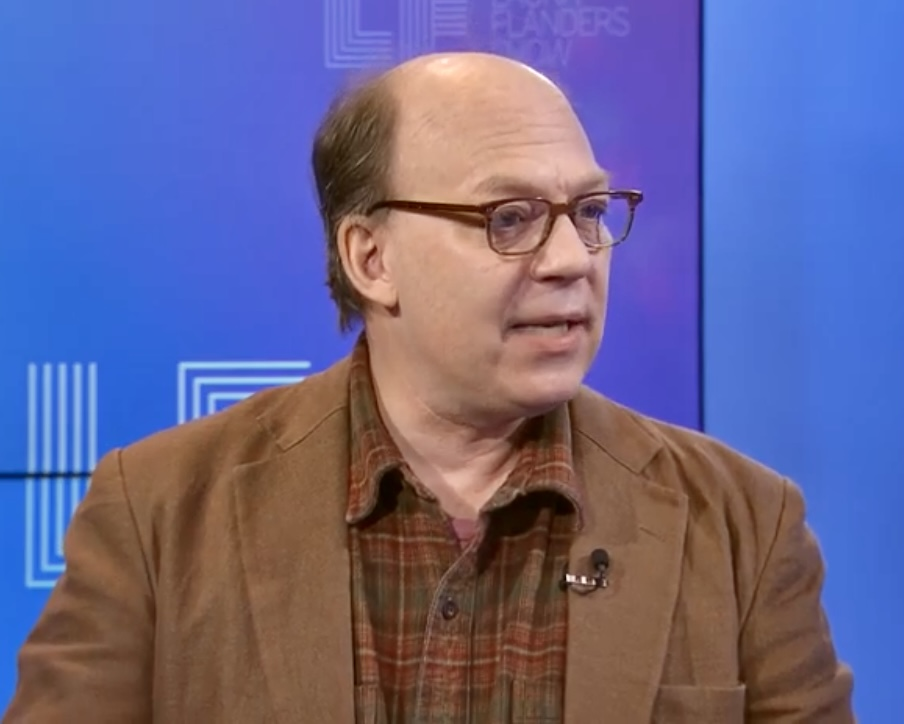
- Grandin in a 2020 interview
- Born: 1962 (age 63–64)
- Education: Brooklyn College (BA); Yale University (PhD)
- Occupations: Historian, Author, Academic
- Employer: Yale University

Greg Grandin (born 1962) is an American historian and author. He is a professor of history at Yale University. He previously taught at New York University.

Grandin is author of several books, including the 2010 book Fordlândia: The Rise and Fall of Henry Ford's Forgotten Jungle City (about Fordlândia in Brazil), which was a finalist for the Pulitzer Prize for History, the National Book Award, and the National Book Critics Circle Award.

A later work, Who is Rigoberta Menchú? (2011), focuses on the treatment of the titular Guatemalan Nobel Peace Prize winner. His book, The Empire of Necessity: Slavery, Freedom, and Deception in the New World (2014), is a study of the factual basis for the novella Benito Cereno by Herman Melville. In 2025, his book America, América: A New History of the New World was published. It was shortlisted for the Cundill History Prize.

Grandin's The End of the Myth: From the Frontier to the Border Wall in the Mind of America (2019) received a Pulitzer Prize for General Nonfiction.

== Early life and education ==
Grandin received a B.A. from Brooklyn College in 1992 and a Ph.D. from Yale University in 1999.

== Career ==
Grandin won the Latin American Studies Association's Bryce Wood Award for the best book published in any discipline on Latin America for Blood of Guatemala: A History of Race and Nation. Eric Hobsbawm called The Last Colonial Massacre a "remarkable and extremely well-written work" that

is about more than the dark history of Guatemala and the Cold War in Latin America. It is about how common people discover politics. It is about the roots of democracy and those of genocide. It is about the hopes and defeats of the twentieth-century left. I could not put this book down.

Grandin has published widely on U.S. foreign policy, the Cold War, and Latin American politics in The Nation, The New York Times, Harper's, and the London Review of Books. He has appeared on the Charlie Rose Show and has interviewed Naomi Klein and Hugo Chávez.

After the death of Chávez, Grandin published a lengthy obituary in The Nation, opining that "the biggest problem Venezuela faced during his rule was not that Chávez was authoritarian but that he wasn't authoritarian enough."

In the summer of 2009, he reported from Honduras on that country's coup, appearing numerous times on Democracy Now! and Grit TV and writing a series of reports in The Nation and elsewhere on the consequences of the overthrow of Honduran president Manuel Zelaya.

Grandin worked as a consultant with the Historical Clarification Commission (Spanish: Comisión para el Esclarecimiento Histórico, or CEH), the Guatemalan truth commission, and has written a number of articles on its methodology, including its genocide ruling and its use of historical analysis.

Grandin was elected to the American Academy of Arts and Sciences in April 2010.

== Selected works ==
External audio
- On This Spanish Slave Ship, Nothing Was As It Seemed, Review of The Empire of Necessity, 5:57, Maureen Corrigan, Fresh Air, NPR, January 27, 2014

=== Author ===
- The Blood of Guatemala: a History of Race and Nation. Duke University Press. 2000. ISBN 978-0-8223-2495-9.
- The Last Colonial Massacre: Latin America in the Cold War. University of Chicago Press. 2004. ISBN 978-0-226-30571-4.
- Empire's Workshop: Latin America, the United States, and the Rise of the New Imperialism. Macmillan. 2007. ISBN 978-0-8050-8323-1.
- Fordlandia: The Rise and Fall of Henry Ford's Forgotten Jungle City. Macmillan. 2010. ISBN 978-0-312-42962-1.
- Who Is Rigoberta Menchu?, Verso, 2011, ISBN 978-1-84467-458-9.
- The Empire of Necessity: Slavery, Freedom, and Deception in the New World, Metropolitan Books, 2014, ISBN 9780805094534.
- Kissinger's Shadow: The Long Reach of America's Most Controversial Statesman, Metropolitan Books, 2015, ISBN 9781627794497.
- "The Strange Career of American Exceptionalism", The Nation, January 2/9, 2017, pp. 22–27.
- The End of the Myth: From the Frontier to the Border Wall in the Mind of America, Metropolitan Books, 2019, ISBN 9781250179821.
- "Kissinger Still at Large at 100", The Nation, vol. 316, no. 11 (May 29/June 5, 2023), pp. 16–19.
- America, América: A New History of the New World. Penguin Press. 2025. ISBN 978-0-593-83125-0.

=== Editor ===
- Greg Grandin; Thomas Miller Klubock, eds. (2007). Truth Commissions: State Terror, History, and Memory. Duke University Press. ISBN 978-0-8223-6674-4.
- Greg Grandin; Gilbert M. Joseph; Emily S. Rosenberg, eds. (2010). A Century of Revolution. Duke University Press. ISBN 978-0-8223-4737-8.

=== Reception ===
Fordlandia was named one of the best books of the year by The New York Times, The New Yorker; NPR; The Boston Globe; San Francisco Chronicle; and the Chicago Tribune.

In 2020, Grandin was awarded a Pulitzer Prize for General Nonfiction for The End of the Myth: From the Frontier to the Border Wall in the Mind of America.
