= Wilmington's Lie =

2020 book by David Zucchino

Wilmington's Lie: The Murderous Coup of 1898 and the Rise of White Supremacy
- Author: David Zucchino
- Language: English
- Publisher: Atlantic Monthly Press
- Publication date: 2020
- Publication place: United States
- Pages: 366
- ISBN: 978-0802128386

Wilmington's Lie: The Murderous Coup of 1898 and the Rise of White Supremacy is a book by the American journalist and author David Zucchino. The book details the events leading up to the Wilmington massacre, in which white supremacists in Wilmington, North Carolina carried out a massacre and coup d'état in 1898.

== Reception ==
The book was awarded the Pulitzer Prize for General Nonfiction in 2021.
