= 2016 Pulitzer Prize =

Awards for journalism and related fields

The 2016 Pulitzer Prizes were awarded by the Pulitzer Prize Board for work during the 2015 calendar year. Prize winners and nominated finalists were announced on April 18, 2016.

== Journalism ==
Public Service
Associated Press "for an investigation of severe labor abuses tied to the supply of seafood to American supermarkets and restaurants, reporting that freed 2,000 slaves, brought perpetrators to justice and inspired reforms."
InsideClimate News "for a probe into a major oil company's decades-long misinformation campaign to muddy the debate over climate change."
Tampa Bay Times "for exposing a local school board's culpability in turning some county schools into failure factories, with tragic consequences for the community."

Breaking News Reporting
Los Angeles Times staff "for exceptional reporting, including both local and global perspectives, on the shooting in San Bernardino and the terror investigation that followed."
The Baltimore Sun staff "for fast-moving coverage of the rioting that followed the death of Freddie Gray, reflecting the newsroom's knowledge of the community and advancing the conversation about police violence."
The Post and Courier staff "for its tenacious effort in obtaining video of a police officer shooting an unarmed Walter Scott and superb reporting that put the recorded shooting in context."

Investigative Reporting
Leonora LaPeter Anton and Anthony Cormier of the Tampa Bay Times and Michael Braga of the Sarasota Herald-Tribune "for a stellar example of collaborative reporting by two news organizations that revealed escalating violence and neglect in Florida mental hospitals and laid the blame at the door of state officials."
Jessica Silver-Greenberg, Michael Corkery and Robert Gebeloff of The New York Times "for a revelatory inquiry into a corporate strategy to add clauses to millions of contracts, stripping consumers and employees of their rights to challenge unfair business practices in court."
Tom Robbins of The Marshall Project and Michael Winerip of The New York Times "for a probing report that lifted the veil on an epidemic of violence by corrections officers against inmates in New York state prisons."

Explanatory Reporting
T. Christian Miller of ProPublica and Ken Armstrong of The Marshall Project "for a startling examination and exposé of law enforcement's enduring failures to investigate reports of rape properly and to comprehend the traumatic effects on its victims."
Colin Woodard of Portland Press Herald/Maine Sunday Telegram "for a compelling account of dramatic ecological changes occurring in the warming ocean region from Nova Scotia to Cape Cod."
Jonathan D. Rockoff, Joseph Walker, Jeanne Whalen, Peter Loftus and Ed Silverman of The Wall Street Journal "for a lucid explanation of how pharmaceutical companies employ secretive tactics to raise drug prices relentlessly, at great cost to patients and taxpayers."

Local Reporting
Michael LaForgia, Cara Fitzpatrick and Lisa Gartner of Tampa Bay Times "for a compelling exploration of the state's archaic and dehumanizing healthcare system for the disabled, leading to swift proposals to improve treatment."
Chris Serres, Glenn Howatt and David Joles of Star Tribune "for a compelling exploration of the state's archaic and dehumanizing healthcare system for the disabled, leading to swift proposals to improve treatment."
Michael Sallah, Emily Michot, Joanna Zuckerman Bernstein and Sohail Al-Jamea of Miami Herald "for the impressive reporting, enhanced by video and graphic elements, on a local drug sting that cost tens of millions of dollars but yielded no significant arrests."
Sarah Maslin Nir of The New York Times "for an investigation into the ugly side of the beauty industry, exposing labor and health practices detrimental to workers in nail salons."

National Reporting
The Washington Post staff "for its revelatory initiative in creating and using a national database to illustrate how often and why the police shoot to kill and who the victims are most likely to be.
Abrahm Lustgarten, Al Shaw, Jeff Larson, Naveena Sadasivam and David Sleight of ProPublica "for ambitious reporting that uncovered greed, political cowardice and willful ignorance as prominent causes of the water crisis currently affecting the American West.'
Jason Cherkis of The Huffington Post "for deeply researched multimedia reporting on opioid addiction that punctured conventional wisdom by showing how many drug overdose deaths may have been preventable, not inevitable."

International Reporting
Alissa J. Rubin of The New York Times "for thoroughly reported and movingly written accounts giving voice to Afghan women who were forced to endure unspeakable cruelties."
The New York Times staff "for shocking stories told in text, video and photography that demystified the rapid rise and enduring strength of the Islamic State."
Tom Wright, Bradley Hope, Simon Clark, Mia Lamar and James Hookway of The Wall Street Journal "for masterful reporting that exposed corruption at the highest levels of a fragile democracy, leading to 'Malaysia's Watergate.'"

Feature Writing
Kathryn Schulz of The New Yorker "for an elegant scientific narrative of the rupturing of the Cascadia fault line, a masterwork of environmental reporting and writing.
Eli Saslow of The Washington Post "for three humane and topical feature stories exploring lives affected by a natural disaster, gun violence and a frayed social safety net."
N.R. Kleinfield of The New York Times "for the layered and riveting account of the last days of a Queens man, part detective story, part eulogy and part exploration of a city's bureaucracy of death."

Commentary
Farah Stockman of The Boston Globe "for extensively reported columns that probe the legacy of busing in Boston and its effect on education in the city with a clear eye on ongoing racial contradictions.
Nicholas D. Kristof of The New York Times "for courageously reported and deeply felt columns focused on the crisis of refugees from Syria and other war-torn regions."
Steve Lopez of Los Angeles Times "for richly nuanced columns written in an elegant voice illuminating huge inequalities in wealth and opportunity in contemporary Los Angeles."

Criticism
Emily Nussbaum of The New Yorker "for television reviews written with an affection that never blunts the shrewdness of her analysis or the easy authority of her writing."
Hilton Als of The New Yorker "for theater reviews written with such erudition and linguistic sensitivity that they often become larger than their subjects."
Manohla Dargis of The New York Times "for reviews and essays that take on the sacred cows of film culture with considerable style and admirable literary and historical reach."

Editorial Writing
John Hackworth and Brian Gleason of Sun Newspapers "for fierce, indignant editorials that demanded truth and change after the deadly assault of an inmate by corrections officers."
Andrew Green, Tricia Bishop, Peter Jensen and Glenn McNatt of The Baltimore Sun "for editorials that demanded accountability in the aftermath of the death of Freddie Gray while also offering guidance to a trouble city."
Editorial board of The New York Times "for editorials that focused on the human cost of gun violence to argue powerfully for the nation's need to address the issue."

Editorial Cartooning
Jack Ohman of The Sacramento Bee "for cartoons that convey wry, rueful perspectives through sophisticated style that combines bold line work with subtle colors and textures."
Matt Davies of Newsday "for cartoons that deliver insightful commentary in a rich and beguiling visual style while offering unconventional takes on the issues of the day."
Steve Sack of Star Tribune "for painterly cartoons that both delight and provoke, leading readers to see the world and its pressing issues in new ways."

Breaking News Photography
Mauricio Lima, Sergey Ponomarev, Tyler Hicks and Daniel Etter of The New York Times "for photographs that captured the resolve of refugees, the perils of their journeys and the struggle of host countries to take them in."
Photography staff of Reuters "for gripping photographs, each with its own voice, that follow migrant refugees hundreds of miles across uncertain boundaries to unknown destinations."
Andrew Burton, Chip Somodevilla, Patrick Smith and Drew Angerer of Getty Images "for intimate photographs that placed viewers in the streets of Baltimore during protests over the death of Freddie Gray."

Feature Photography
Jessica Rinaldi of The Boston Globe "for the raw and revealing photographic story of a boy who strives to find his footing after abuse by those he trusted."
Jessica Rinaldi of The Boston Globe "for photographs that put a human face to the American opioid epidemic by chronicling the struggles of a single addict in Massachusetts."
Photography staff of The Post and Courier "for photographs that tell from many angles the story of a racially motivated church shooting and its sorrowful but sometimes also heartening aftermath."

== Letters, Drama, and Music ==
Fiction
The Sympathizer by Viet Thanh Nguyen, "a layered immigrant tale told in the wry, confessional voice of a 'man of two minds' -- and two countries, Vietnam and the United States."
Get in Trouble: Stories, by Kelly Link, "a collection of short stories in which a writer with a fertile and often fabulist imagination explores inner lies and odd corners of reality."
Maud's Line by Margaret Verble, "a novel whose humble prose seems well-suited to the remote American milieu it so engagingly evokes: the Indian allotments of 1920s Oklahoma."

Drama
Hamilton by Lin-Manuel Miranda, "a landmark American musical about the gifted and self-destructive founding father whose story becomes both contemporary and irresistible."
Gloria by Branden Jacobs-Jenkins, "a play of wit and irony that deftly transports the audience from satire to thriller and back again."
The Humans by Stephen Karam, "a profoundly affecting drama that sketches the psychological and emotional contours of an average American family."

History
Custer's Trials: A Life on the Frontier of a New America by T. J. Stiles, "a rich and surprising new telling of the journey of the iconic American soldier whose death turns out not to have been the main point of his life."
Marching Home: Union Veterans and Their Unending Civil War by Brian Matthew Jordan, "a history exposing mental and physical infirmities that beset Civil War veterans, maladies that echo in the experiences of many veterans today."
Target Tokyo: Jimmy Doolittle and the Raid That Avenged Pearl Harbor by James M. Scott, "a spellbinding narrative that uses Chinese, Russian and Japanese sources to expand the story of the first American attack on Japan during World War II."
The Pentagon's Brain: An Uncensored History of DARPA, America's Top-Secret Military Research Agency by Annie Jacobsen, "a brilliantly researched account of a small but powerful secret government agency whose military research profoundly affects world affairs."

Biography or Autobiography
Barbarian Days: A Surfing Life, by William Finnegan, "a finely crafted memoir of a youthful obsession that has propelled the author through a distinguished writing career."
Custer's Trials: A Life on the Frontier of a New America by T. J. Stiles, "a rich and surprising new telling of the journey of the iconic American soldier whose death turns out not to have been the main point of his life."
The Light of the World: A Memoir by Elizabeth Alexander, "a prose elegy and love story told in a lyrical voice that carries the author and her readers across the difficult terrain from grief to consolation."

Poetry
Ozone Journal by Peter Balakian, "poems that bear witness to the old losses and tragedies that undergird a global age of danger and uncertainty."
Alive: New and Selected Poems by Elizabeth Willis, "a book worthy of its title in which the poet calls readers to look deep within themselves and regard anew the struggle to live."
Four-Legged Girl by Diane Seuss, "a richly improvisational poetry collection that leads readers through a gallery of incisive and beguiling portraits and landscapes."

General Nonfiction
Black Flags: The Rise of ISIS, by Joby Warrick, "a deeply reported book of remarkable clarity showing how the flawed rationale for the Iraq War led to the explosive growth of the Islamic State."
Between the World and Me by Ta-Nehisi Coates, "a powerful book that passionately and bleakly propounds the hazards faced by black men coming of age in America."
If the Oceans Were Ink: An Unlikely Friendship and a Journey to the Heart of the Quran by Carla Power, "a perceptive account of a year spent reading the Quran, displaying grace, subtlety and humane intellect as antidotes to rampant Islamophobia."

Pulitzer Prize for Music
In for a Penny, In for a Pound by Henry Threadgill "a highly original work in which notated music and improvisation mesh in a sonic tapestry that seems the very expression of modern American life"
The Blind Banister by Timo Andres, "a three-movement piece inspired by Beethoven that takes listeners on a beautiful quest in which they rise and fall with the music's ascending and descending scales."
The Mechanics: Six from the Shop Floor by Carter Pann, "a suite that imagines its four saxophonists as mechanics engaged in a rhythmic interplay of precision and messiness that is by turns bubbly, pulsing, dreamy and nostalgic (Blue Griffin)"
