= The Rising Sun =

1970 book by John Toland

The Rising Sun: The Decline and Fall of the Japanese Empire, 1936–1945
- Author: John Toland
- Language: English
- Subject: World War, 1939-1945--Japan
- Genre: Non-fiction
- Publisher: Random House
- Publication date: 1970
- Dewey Decimal: 940.5352
- LC Class: D767.2 .T58

The Rising Sun: The Decline and Fall of the Japanese Empire, 1936–1945 is a nonfiction history book by John Toland, published by Random House in 1970. The book won the 1971 Pulitzer Prize for General Nonfiction. It was re-published by Random House in 2003.

A chronicle of the rise and fall of the Empire of Japan during World War II, from the invasion of Manchuria and China to the atomic bombings of Hiroshima and Nagasaki, told from the Japanese perspective, it is in the author's words, "a factual saga of people caught up in the flood of the most overwhelming war of mankind, told as it happened—muddled, ennobling, disgraceful, frustrating, full of paradox."

== Synopsis ==
The chronicle starts in February 1936 with the attempted assassinations of the Premier and other Japanese officials. From there, it follows the path from Pearl Harbor and Clark Air Base in the Philippines through Japan's involvement in World War II. About one-fourth of the text is dedicated to the pre-war period in Japan. Toland cites almost 500 interviews with individuals – mostly Japanese – as context for the book. The last half of the book focuses on American attacks across the central Pacific, including the 1944 capture of Saipan, the effects of atomic bombs on Hiroshima and Nagasaki, and the reaction of the nation to the surrender of Japan at the end of World War II.

== Critical reception ==
The Rising Sun won the 1971 Pulitzer Prize for General Nonfiction. A 1972 review of the book called it "an absorbing, fascinating, and objective account of the Pacific phase of World War II."
