= Beautiful Swimmers =

1976 nonfiction book by William W. Warner

- Cover of first edition, art by Consuelo Hanks
- Author: William W. Warner
- Language: English
- Genre: Nonfiction
- Publisher: Back Bay Books
- Publication date: 1976
- Pages: 304
- ISBN: 0-316-92326-5
- OCLC: 1659680

Beautiful Swimmers: Watermen, Crabs and the Chesapeake Bay (1976) is a nonfiction book by William W. Warner about the Chesapeake Bay, blue crabs and watermen. The book takes its name from the generic name of the blue crab, Callinectes, which is Greek for "beautiful swimmer." It won the 1977 Pulitzer Prize for General Nonfiction. As of the time of the author's death in 2008, the book had never been out of print.
