= Nathan Thrall =

American journalist

- Born: 1979 or 1980 (age 46–47)
- Education: University of California, Santa Barbara (BA); Columbia University (MA)
- Occupation: Writer
- Website: nathanthrall.com

Nathan Thrall is an American author, essayist, and journalist based in Jerusalem. Thrall is known for his 2023 nonfiction work A Day in the Life of Abed Salama: Anatomy of a Jerusalem Tragedy, and is a contributor to several literary magazines. As of 2023 he is a professor at Bard College in New York state.

Thrall is the former director of the Arab-Israeli Project at the International Crisis Group, where from 2010 until 2020 he covered Israel, the West Bank, the Gaza Strip, and Israel's relations with its neighbors.

== Early life and education ==
Thrall is Jewish, and his mother is a Jewish émigrée from the Soviet Union.

Thrall completed a BA at the University of California, Santa Barbara's College of Creative Studies and an MA (politics) at Columbia University. He participated in Birthright Israel and learned Arabic and Hebrew at Tel Aviv University.

== Career ==
Thrall was on the editorial staff of The New York Review of Books, before Robert Malley hired him at the International Crisis Group. At the start of his tenure at the International Crisis Group, Thrall lived in Gaza. He was director of the Arab-Israeli Project at the group, where from 2010 to 2020 he covered Israel, the West Bank, Gaza, and Israel's relations with its neighbors.

He was in 2021 a contributor to The New York Times Magazine, the London Review of Books, and The New York Review of Books.

Thrall was in November 2023 a professor at the private liberal arts college Bard College, in Red Hook, New York.

== Books ==
=== The Only Language They Understand ===
Thrall's first published book was an essay collection, The Only Language They Understand: Forcing Compromise in Israel and Palestine (Metropolitan/Henry Holt, 2017; Picador, 2018). It received positive reviews in The New York Times, Foreign Affairs, Time, and The New York Review of Books. The Jewish Book Council's Bob Goldfarb wrote that the book "brings unparalleled clarity to the dynamics of Israeli-Palestinian relations, and is an essential guide to the history, personalities, and ideas behind the conflict." Mosaic magazine selected the book as one of the best of the year, writing, "A knowledgeable and bold retelling of the Israel-Palestinian conflict that forces readers to take a serious and fresh look at their assumptions. Throughout its counterintuitive retelling of this history, it offers an unusually provocative and sometimes startling contribution to the genre."

=== A Day in the Life of Abed Salama ===
A Day in the Life of Abed Salama: Anatomy of a Jerusalem Tragedy (2023) is a work of non-fiction that tells the story of the interwoven lives of Abed Salama and several Palestinian inhabitants of Jerusalem. It was named a best book of 2023 by over ten publications, including The New Yorker, The Economist, Time, The Financial Times, The New Republic, The Millions, Mother Jones, The Forward, Booklist, the New Statesman, and The Irish Times, and was selected as a New York Times Book Review Editors' Choice. The Financial Times named it a best book of 2023 in two categories, Literary Nonfiction and Politics, stating, "This quietly heartbreaking work of non-fiction reads like a novel. At its centre is a tragic road accident outside Jerusalem in the West Bank from which Thrall, a Jewish American journalist, carefully traces the labyrinthine lives of those involved and the tangled web of politics, history and culture that ensnare them all."

It won the 2024 Pulitzer Prize for General Nonfiction and was shortlisted for the 2024 Orwell Prize for Political Writing.

== Journalism ==
=== "The Separate Regimes Delusion" ===
In January 2021, the London Review of Books published Thrall's article, "The Separate Regimes Delusion," which argued, "The premise that Israel is a democracy, maintained by Peace Now, Meretz, the editorial board of Haaretz and other critics of occupation, rests on the belief that one can separate the pre-1967 state from the rest of the territory under its control. A conceptual wall must be maintained between two regimes: (good) democratic Israel and its (bad) provisional occupation." Thrall's article was praised in Haaretz by Gideon Levy, who wrote, "the American writer Nathan Thrall, who lives in Jerusalem, published an eye-opening and mind-expanding piece in The London Review of Books .... Thrall doesn't hesitate to criticize the supposedly liberal-Zionist and leftist organizations, from Meretz and Peace Now to Yesh Din and Haaretz. All of them believe that Israel is a democracy and oppose annexation because it could undermine their false belief that the occupation is happening somewhere else, outside of Israel, and is only temporary."

=== "A Day in the Life of Abed Salama" ===
In March 2021, The New York Review of Books published Thrall's piece, "A Day in the Life of Abed Salama: One man's quest to find his son lays bare the reality of Palestinian life under Israeli rule," together with an animated trailer. The article was covered in The Washington Post, Foreign Policy, The American Prospect, Jewish Currents, European publications, the Israeli newspaper Haaretz, a podcast episode hosted by New York Times columnist Peter Beinart, and a two-part, forty-minute segment on Democracy Now! Longreads called it "an astonishing feat of reporting" and named it a Best Feature of 2021.

Thrall went on to write a non-fiction book based on the article, completing the work with the help of New York Bard College, which awarded Thrall a writing fellowship. The college invited him to teach a course and Thrall proposed one on Israeli apartheid which he gave for the spring of 2023. A Day in the Life of Abed Salama-Anatomy of a Jerusalem Tragedy was published on October 3, 2023 by Metropolitan Books.

== Published works ==
=== Books ===
- Thrall, Nathan (2023). A Day in the Life of Abed Salama: Anatomy of a Jerusalem Tragedy. New York, NY: Metropolitan Books, Henry Holt & Company. Hardcover ISBN 9781250854971. ebook ISBN 9781250854988.
- Thrall, Nathan (2017). The Only Language They Understand: Forcing Compromise in Israel and Palestine. New York, NY: Metropolitan Books, Henry Holt & Company. ISBN 978-1627797092.

=== Book chapters ===
- "Can Hamas be part of the solution?," in Jamie Stern-Weiner ed., Moment of Truth: Tackling Israel–Palestine's Toughest Questions. New York, New York: OR Books, 2018.
