= Micki McElya =

American author and historian

- Born: 1972 (age 53–54)

Academic background
- Education: B.A., 1994, Bryn Mawr College; PhD., 2003, New York University
- Thesis: Monumental citizenship: reading the national mammy memorial controversy of the early twentieth century (2003)

Academic work
- Discipline: women's history
- Institutions: University of Alabama; University of Connecticut
- Notable works: The Politics of Mourning: Death and Honor in Arlington National Cemetery

Micki Paige McElya (born 1972) is an American author and historian. She is a professor of History at the University of Connecticut. In 2017, her book The Politics of Mourning: Death and Honor in Arlington National Cemetery was a finalist for the Pulitzer Prize for General Nonfiction.

== Early life and education ==
McElya received her Bachelor of Arts degree in history from Bryn Mawr College and her Ph.D. from New York University in 2003.

== Career ==
Upon graduating from New York University, McElya was hired as an assistant professor of American Studies at the University of Alabama. During her tenure, she published a book titled Clinging to Mammy: The Faithful Slave in Twentieth-Century America through the Harvard University Press. The book focused on how the de-sexualization and infantilization of African American women during slavery helped reiterate the black maternal iconography and slavery apologia. Clinging to Mammy also earned her a place on the 2007 Myers Center Outstanding Book Awards Advancing Human Rights.

McElya eventually left the University of Alabama in 2008 to accept a position as an associate professor of History at the University of Connecticut. She published her second book titled The Politics of Mourning: Death and Honor in Arlington National Cemetery through the Harvard University Press, which earned her a Pulitzer Prize for General Nonfiction nomination. The Politics of Mourning focused on the history of the Arlington National Cemetery and has been described “a luminous investigation of how policies and practices at Arlington National Cemetery have mirrored the nation’s fierce battles over race, politics, honor, and loyalty.”
