= Black Flags: The Rise of ISIS =

Book by Joby Warrick

- Author: Joby Warrick
- Subject: Islamic State of Iraq and the Levant, Terrorism
- Publisher: Doubleday
- Publication date: 2015
- Pages: xvii, 344 pages, 8 unnumbered pages of plates
- Awards: 2016 Pulitzer Prize for General Nonfiction
- ISBN: 9780385538213
- LC Class: HV6433.I722 I8593 2015

Black Flags: The Rise of ISIS is a 2015 nonfiction book by the American journalist Joby Warrick. The book traces the rise and spread of militant Islam behind the Islamic State of Iraq and the Levant. It won the 2016 Pulitzer Prize for General Nonfiction.

== Reception ==
=== Critical response ===
Black Flags has been praised by journalists. Michiko Kakutani of The New York Times called it a "gripping new book" and wrote, "Mr. Warrick [...] has a gift for constructing narratives with a novelistic energy and detail, and in this volume, he creates the most revealing portrait yet laid out in a book of Abu Musab Al-Zarqawi, the founding father of the organization that would become the Islamic State (also known as ISIS or ISIL)." He added, "for readers interested in the roots of the Islamic State and the evil genius of its godfather [...] there is no better book to begin with than Black Flags." Bob Drogin of the Los Angeles Times similarly described it as "invaluable for anyone struggling to understand the gruesome excesses and inexplicable appeal of ISIS," despite noting that it works better as a biography of al-Zarqawi than "explaining the subsequent 'rise of ISIS,' as the title promises." P. D. Smith of The Guardian said the book "has the narrative drive of a thriller" and observed, "From the mistakes made before and after the invasion of Iraq, to the continuing tragedy of Syria's civil war, Warrick's account is both compelling and authoritative."

=== Awards ===
The book received the 2016 Pulitzer Prize for General Nonfiction. The Pulitzer citation described the book as "a deeply reported book of remarkable clarity."

== Television adaptation ==
In 2016, HBO was reported to have started work of adapting the book for TV mini series. It will be produced by Bradley Cooper and Todd Phillips (via their joint production banner Joint Effort), directed by Helmer Tim Van Patten (also directed Game of Thrones and Boardwalk Empire) and television adapted by Gregg Hurwitz. The series is expected to be named "Black Flags".
