= David Zucchino =

American journalist and author

David Zucchino is an American journalist and author.

== Career ==
Zucchino was awarded a Pulitzer Prize in the Feature Writing category in 1989 for his series Being Black in South Africa, written for The Philadelphia Inquirer.

In 2020, Zucchino published Wilmington's Lie: The Murderous Coup of 1898 and the Rise of White Supremacy, a book about the Wilmington massacre. The book won the 2021 Pulitzer Prize for General Nonfiction, was an Amazon "Best of January" selection; a "Book of the Week" at Publishers Weekly, the New York Post, and Literary Hub; and a Library Journal "2020 Title to Watch". It was described as "a gripping account of the overthrow of the elected government of a Black-majority North Carolina city after Reconstruction that untangles a complicated set of power dynamics cutting across race, class and gender."

As of 2020, Zucchino was a contributing writer for The New York Times.

Zucchino is a four-time Pulitzer Prize finalist for coverage of Lebanon, Africa, inner-city Philadelphia, and Iraq. He has reported from more than three dozen countries, most recently from Iraq. He is also the author of the books Myth of the Welfare Queen (1997) and Thunder Run: The Armored Strike to Capture Baghdad (2004).

Zucchino was a foreign and national correspondent for the Los Angeles Times from 2001 to 2016, focusing on Afghanistan, Iraq, and Libya. Before that, he worked for 20 years at The Philadelphia Inquirer, as the bureau chief in Beirut, Lebanon; Nairobi, Kenya; and Johannesburg. For The Inquirer, he also covered the Middle East, Africa, and wars in Chechnya and the former Yugoslavia.

In November 2022, North Carolina Governor Roy Cooper awarded Zucchino the North Carolina Award, the highest civilian honor given by the state, for his contributions to literature.
