= John Toland (historian) =

American writer (1912–2004)

John Willard Toland
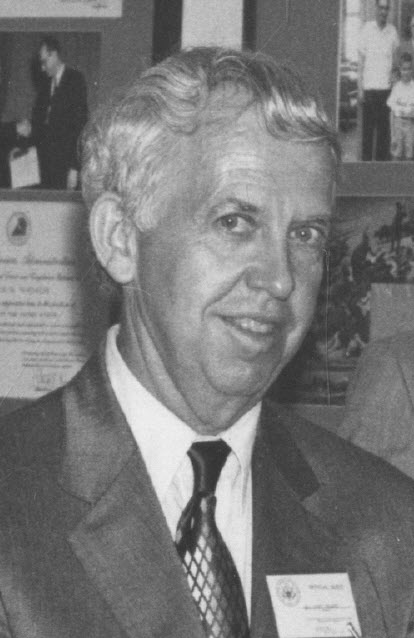
- Toland in 1971
- Born: June 29, 1912; La Crosse, Wisconsin, U.S.
- Died: January 4, 2004 (aged 91); Danbury, Connecticut, U.S.
- Education: Williams College; Yale University
- Writing career
- Notable awards: Pulitzer Prize for General Nonfiction

John Willard Toland (June 29, 1912 – January 4, 2004) was an American writer and historian. He is best known for his biography of Adolf Hitler and a Pulitzer Prize-winning history of World War II-era Japan, The Rising Sun.

== Biography ==
Toland was born in 1912 in La Crosse, Wisconsin. He graduated from Phillips Exeter Academy in New Hampshire in 1932 and from Williams College in 1936 and attended the Yale School of Drama for a time. His original goal was to become a playwright. In the summers between college years, he traveled with hobos and wrote several plays with hobos as central characters, none of which were performed. He recalled in 1961 that in his early years as a writer he had been "about as big a failure as a man can be". He claimed to have written six complete novels, 26 plays, and a hundred short stories before completing his first sale, a short story for which The American Magazine paid $165 in 1954. At one point he managed to get an article on dirigibles into LOOK magazine; it proved extremely popular and led to his career as a historian. Dirigibles were the subject of his first full-length published book, Ships in the Sky (1957).

His most important is considered to be The Rising Sun (Random House, 1970), for which he won the Pulitzer Prize for General Nonfiction in 1971. Based on original and extensive interviews with high-ranking Japanese officials who survived the war, the book chronicles the Empire of Japan from the military rebellion of February 1936 to the end of World War II.

== Death ==
Toland died of pneumonia on January 4, 2004, at Danbury Hospital in Danbury, Connecticut.

== Books ==
=== Non-fiction ===
External videos
- Booknotes interview with Toland on Captured by History, September 14, 1997, C-SPAN

- Ships in the Sky: The Story of the Great Dirigibles (New York: Henry Holt; London: F. Muller, 1957)
- Battle: The Story of the Bulge, 1959, ISBN 0-8032-9437-9
- But Not in Shame: The Six Months After Pearl Harbor, 1962, ISBN 0-345-25748-0
- The Dillinger Days, 1963, ISBN 0-306-80626-6
- The Flying Tigers – Copyrighted 1963 First Printing From Laurel-Leaf Books 1979. Published by Dell Publishing ISBN 0-440-92621-1
- The Last 100 Days: The Tumultuous and Controversial Story of the Final Days of World War II in Europe, 1966, reprint (2003) ISBN 0-8129-6859-X
- The Rising Sun: The Decline and Fall of the Japanese Empire, 1936–1945, 1970 (2 vols.) HC, ISBN 0-394-44311-X, reprint ISBN 0-8129-6858-1
- The Great Dirigibles: Their Triumphs & Disasters, 1972, ISBN 0-486-21397-8
- Adolf Hitler: The Definitive Biography, 1976, ISBN 0-385-42053-6.
- No Man's Land: 1918, The Last Year of the Great War, 1980, ISBN 0-385-11291-2
- Infamy: Pearl Harbor And Its Aftermath, 1982, ISBN 0-385-42051-X
- In Mortal Combat: Korea 1950–1953, 1991, ISBN 0-688-10079-1
- Captured by History: One Man's Vision of Our Tumultuous Century, 1997, ISBN 0-312-15490-9

=== Novels ===
- Gods of War, 1985, ISBN 0-385-18007-1
- Occupation, 1987, ISBN 0-385-19819-1

== Articles ==
- 'Death of a Dirigible', February 1959, American Heritage, Volume X Number 2, pp 18–23

== See also ==
- List of books by or about Adolf Hitler
