= Carla Power =

American writer

- Born: St. Louis, Missouri, U.S.
- Education: Yale University (BA); St Antony's College, Oxford (MPhil); Columbia University (MS)
- Occupation: Author

Carla Power is an American author.

== Early life and education ==
As a child, Power lived in St. Louis, Missouri and also in Iran, India, Afghanistan, Egypt and Italy as her family moved around. She studied at Yale University, and gained an M.Phil. in modern Middle Eastern studies from St Antony's College, Oxford and a degree from the Columbia University Graduate School of Journalism.

== Career ==
Her book If the Oceans Were Ink was a 2016 Pulitzer Prize general nonfiction finalist.

Her book Home, Land, Security was a 2022 Pulitzer Prize finalist.

== Books ==
- If the Oceans Were Ink: An Unlikely Friendship and a Journey to the Heart of the Quran (2015)
- Home, Land, Security: Deradicalization and the Journey Back from Extremism (2021) (Note: Briefly reviewed in the September 27, 2021 issue of The New Yorker, p.83.)

———————
