= Why Survive? =

1975 book by Robert N. Butler

Why Survive? Being Old In America
- First edition
- Author: Robert N. Butler
- Publisher: Harper & Row
- Publication date: 1975
- Pages: 512
- ISBN: 978-0-8018-7425-3

Why Survive? Being Old In America was written by Robert N. Butler and published by Harper & Row in 1975. It won the 1976 Pulitzer Prize for General Nonfiction. The book discusses a range of problems faced by older people in American society stemming from poverty, the failures of the Social Security system, and social isolation, and argues for the necessity of comprehensive reform and developing of a strategy for dealing with an aging population.
