= William W. Warner =

American biologist (1920–2008)

William W. Warner (April 2, 1920 – April 18, 2008) was an American biologist and writer. He was awarded the 1977 Pulitzer Prize for General Nonfiction for his first book Beautiful Swimmers: Watermen, Crabs and the Chesapeake Bay, which was based on his experiences living and working among crab fishermen on the Chesapeake.

Warner was a 1943 graduate of Princeton University. During World War II, Warner served in the Pacific Theater of operations as an aerial photograph analyst with a Marine air group.

== Works ==
- Beautiful Swimmers: Watermen, Crabs, and the Chesapeake Bay (1976)
- Distant Water: The Fate of the North Atlantic Fisherman (1983)
- Into the Porcupine Cave and Other Odysseys: Adventures of an Occasional Naturalist (1999, short stories)
- At Peace with All Their Neighbors: Catholics and Catholicism in the National Capital, 1787–1860 (1994)
