= O Strange New World =

1964 book by Howard Mumford Jones

O Strange New World: American Culture - The Formative Years
- First edition
- Author: Howard Mumford Jones
- Subject: History of the United States
- Publisher: Viking Press
- Publication date: 1964
- Pages: 464
- OCLC: 250063

O Strange New World: American Culture - The Formative Years is a book written by Howard Mumford Jones and published by Viking Press in 1964; it won the 1965 Pulitzer Prize for General Nonfiction.
