= John Cassidy (journalist) =

American journalist (born 1963)

John Joseph Cassidy (born 1963) is a British-American journalist and economic historian. A staff writer at The New Yorker, Cassidy is a contributor to The New York Review of Books, and was previously an editor at The Sunday Times of London and a deputy editor at the New York Post.

== Background and education ==
Cassidy received his undergraduate degree from University College, Oxford, studied at Harvard University on a Harkness Fellowship, and received a master's degree in journalism from Columbia University and a master's in economics from New York University.

== Economics writing ==
Cassidy is the author of the well-received books Dot.con: The Greatest Story Ever Sold, which examines the dot-com bubble, and How Markets Fail: The Logic of Economic Calamities, which combines a skeptical history of economics with an analysis of the 2000s United States housing bubble and credit bust. He is also well known for his biographical and economic writing on the famous Cambridge economist John Maynard Keynes, whom he interprets in a largely positive light.

Cassidy's latest book, Capitalism and Its Critics, A History: From the Industrial Revolution to AI was published in 2025. It is described as "A sweeping, dramatic history of capitalism as seen through the eyes of its fiercest critics." The Financial Times listed it as Most Anticipated Book of 2025.

== Bibliography ==
=== Books ===
- Dot.con: the Greatest Story Ever Sold (2002)
- How Markets Fail: the Logic of Economic Clamities (2009)
- Capitalism and Its Critics, A History: From the Industrial Revolution to AI (2025)

=== Selected articles ===
- "The Fountainhead". Profiles. The New Yorker. April 24, 2000. (Note: Alan Greenspan.)
- "Forces of divergence : is surging inequality endemic to capitalism?". The Critics. Books. The New Yorker. 90 (6): 69–73. March 31, 2014.
- "A world of woes : a global take on a decade of financial crises". The Critics. Books. The New Yorker. 94 (28): 54–58. September 17, 2018. (Note: Online version is titled "The real cost of the 2008 financial crisis".)

———————

Notes and full bibliographic citations
