= Philip P. Kerby =

American journalist

Philip P. Kerby (1911–1993) was an American editorial writer who worked for the Los Angeles Times from 1971 to 1985. He won the Pulitzer Prize for editorial writing in 1976.

With only a high school education, Kerby was "regarded as highly self-educated and extremely bright". Otis Chandler said to Kerby when he won the Pulitzer, "You have raised the intellectual level of this newspaper". His specialty was criminal justice, governmental censorship, and secrecy.

== Early years and education ==
Kirby was born on December 24 in Pueblo, Colorado, where he graduated from Centennial High School in 1931. He studied at Harvard University from 1957 to 1958 through a Ford Foundation grant.

== Career ==
Kirby began his journalism career as a reporter for the Pueblo Star-Journal Chieftain, then he became an editorial writer until 1942. He moved to radio, joining KGHF in 1947. In 1948, Kirby became the editor of Rocky Mountain Life, then the editor at Frontier Magazine, then the associate editor of The Nation. He joined the Los Angeles Times as senior editorial writer in 1971.

== Awards ==
Kirby received the Denver Press Club Award as an outstanding radio journalist in 1947. He won the Pulitzer Prize in the "Editorial Writing" category in 1976 for "articles against government secrecy and judicial censorship". He received the Public Service award from the State Bar of California in 1983.
