= Louise Aronson =

American geriatrician and academic (born 1963)

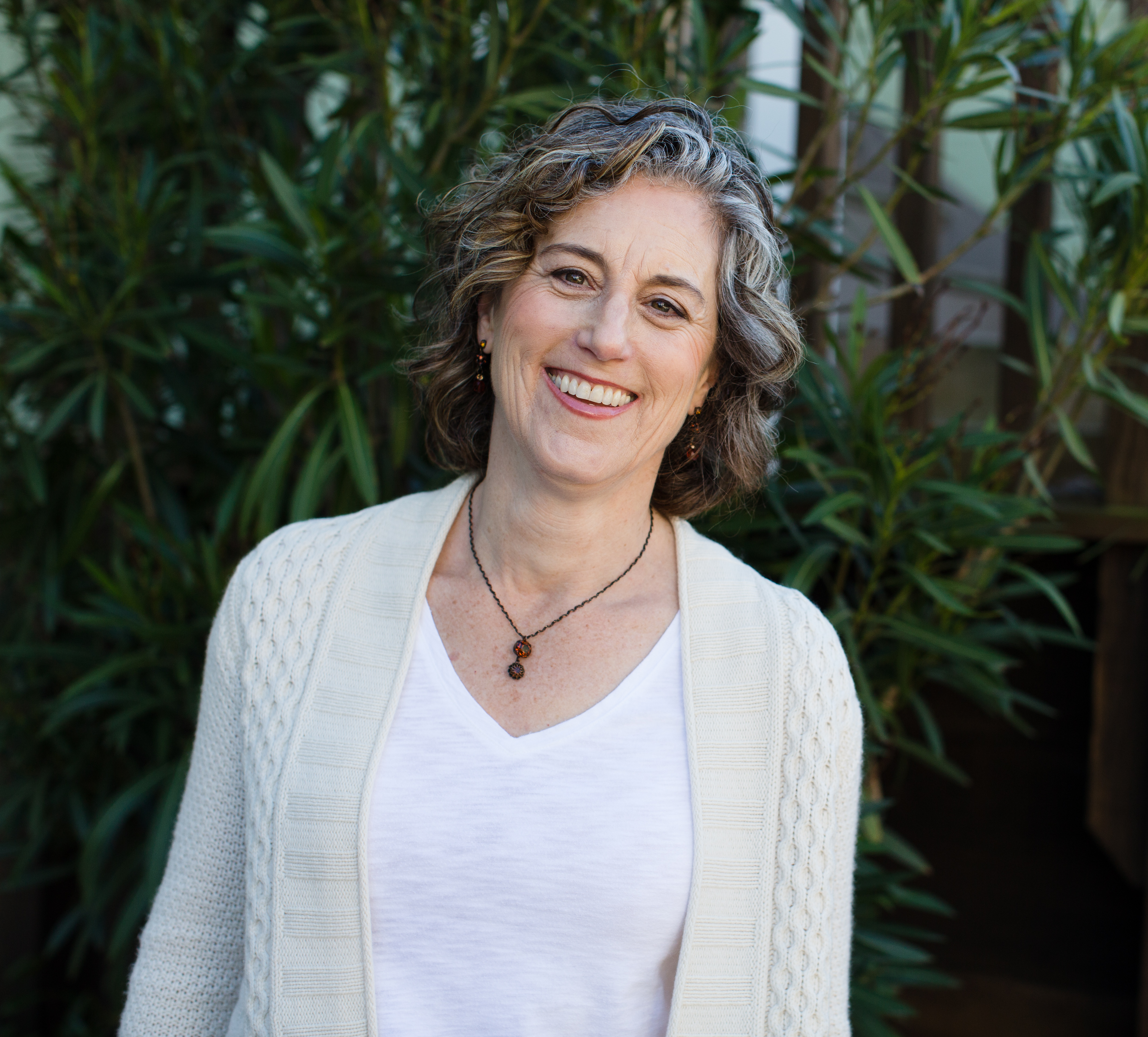
- Born: 1963 (age 62–63) (Note: In 2019, Aronson was reported to be 55); San Francisco, California, USA

Academic background
- Education: B.A, History and Medical Anthropology, 1986, Brown University; M.D. 1992, Harvard Medical School; MFA, Warren Wilson College

Academic work
- Institutions: University of California, San Francisco
- Main interests: geriatrics
- Notable works: Elderhood: Redefining Aging, Transforming Medicine, Reimagining Life
- Website: louisearonson.com

Louise Aronson (born 1963) is an American geriatrician, writer, and professor of medicine at the University of California, San Francisco (UCSF). Her book Elderhood: Redefining Aging, Transforming Medicine, Reimagining Life was a finalist for the 2020 Pulitzer Prize for General Nonfiction.

== Early life and education ==
Aronson was born in San Francisco to Samuel Aronson and Mary Ann Goldman Aronson. She considers her family to be “secular but decidedly Jewish in sensibility,” and of German and French Jewish ancestry. Growing up, she had no intention of pursuing a medical degree; instead, she hoped to become an author or basketball player. With no intention of ever becoming a doctor, Aronson refused to enroll in colleges that had math or science requirements. This led her to enroll in Brown University's history and anthropology program for her Bachelor of Arts degree. After receiving her undergraduate degree, Aronson attended Harvard Medical School for her medical degree and earned her Master of Fine Arts (MFA) from Warren Wilson College.

== Career ==
In late 2006, Aronson accepted a position as an academic physician at the University of California, San Francisco (UCSF) health sciences campus. In her early years at the school, she received their Medical Education Research Fellowship and their 2011 Cooke Award for the Scholarship of Teaching and Learning. From 2010 until 2016, she was a member of UCSF's Academy of Medical Educators. During this time, she was also awarded an Arnold P. Gold Foundation Professorship for her project Fostering Humanism through Critical Reflection and Narrative Advocacy. Her research developed into her first novel titled A History of the Present Illness, a collection of fictional stories that explore the nature of medicine and humanity. When asked why she chose to write a fictional story, Aronson replied "By using fiction, I could take 20 years of experience and tell a story in the way I felt was most effective and draw from a whole array of real patients and people."

Following the success of her first novel, Aronson was encouraged by her editor to write a non-fictional account of medicine and aging. As a result, she wrote her second book titled Elderhood: Redefining Aging, Transforming Medicine, Reimagining Life which included her own personal experiences in the medical field and confronting her parents aging. Aronson was named a 2019 Influencer in Aging and 2019–2020 Humanism in Aging Leadership Award winner. In 2020, Aronson's book was named a finalist for the Pulitzer Prize for General Nonfiction.
