= The Undying (book) =

2019 non-fiction book by Anne Boyer

The Undying: Pain, Vulnerability, Mortality, Medicine, Art, Time, Dreams, Data, Exhaustion, Cancer, and Care
- First edition cover image
- Author: Anne Boyer
- Audio read by: Amy Finegan
- Cover artist: Strick&Williams
- Language: English
- Subject: Cancer; Internal medicine; Healthcare in the United States; Mortality
- Genre: Non-fiction; Autobiography
- Publisher: Farrar, Straus and Giroux
- Publication date: 17 September 2019
- Publication place: United States
- Media type: Print (hardback)
- Pages: 308/320 (first edition)
- Awards: Pulitzer Prize for General Nonfiction
- ISBN: 978-0-374-27934-9 (first edition, hardback)
- OCLC: 1089841413
- Dewey Decimal: 616.99/4490092 B
- LC Class: RC280.B8 B645 2019

The Undying: Pain, Vulnerability, Mortality, Medicine, Art, Time, Dreams, Data, Exhaustion, Cancer, and Care is a 2019 memoir by the American author, poet, and essayist Anne Boyer. The book chronicles Boyer's experience as a breast cancer patient. Boyer takes an untraditional approach to the standard illness narrative, by weaving together her personal journey as a patient in treatment with reflections on art and literature, and critiques of capitalism and the medical industry.

The book won the 2020 Pulitzer Prize for General Nonfiction, and was a finalist for the PEN America's Jean Stein Book Award. The Pulitzer committee described the book as "an elegant and unforgettable narrative about the brutality of illness and the capitalism of cancer care in America."

== Synopsis ==
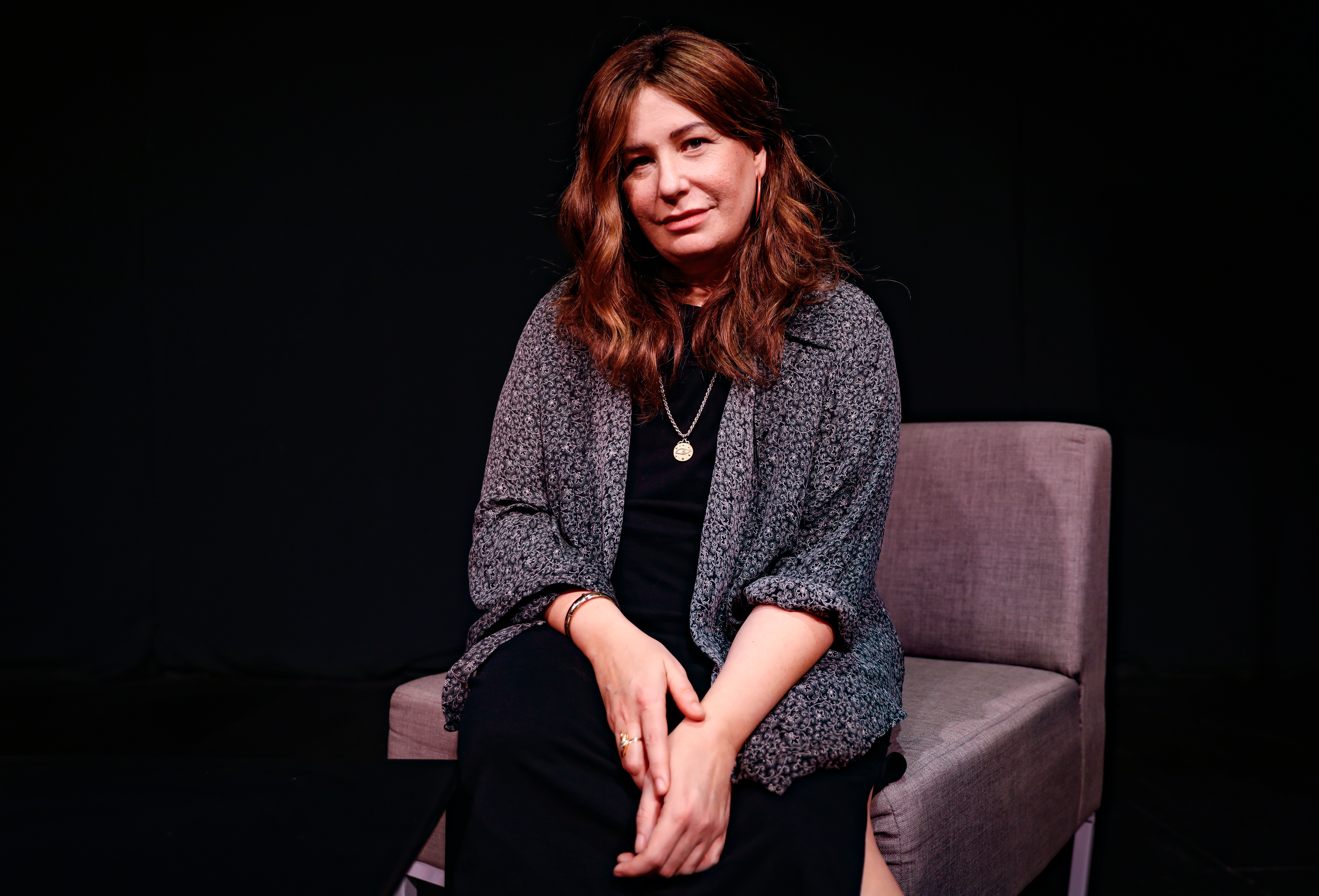
Anne Boyer in 2023

At the age of 41, Anne Boyer is diagnosed with triple-negative breast cancer. She is a teacher and a single mother raising a daughter.

Boyer reflects on the flaws in the American healthcare system. Despite undergoing intensive chemotherapy with medications like cyclophosphamide and doxorubicin, Boyer must consistently work. Ten days after her double mastectomy she gives a university lecture on Walt Whitman's The Sleepers with surgical drainage bags stitched to her compression dressings.

== Reception ==
=== Reviews ===
Numerous reviews have described The Undying as an unflinching look at cancer treatment. The New York Times' nonfiction critic, Jennifer Szalai, called Boyer's memoir "extraordinary and furious". In a review for The New York Review of Books, Nellie Hermann writes about how Boyer's memoir can not be easily categorised as a standard illness-narrative.

NPR's Sascha Cohen writes, "The Undying catalogs the unceasing losses that accompany a breast cancer diagnosis in the 21st century." Cohen calls the memoir an "anti-capitalist indictment, as biting cultural criticism, as vengeance".

Parallels between works mentioned by Boyer, such as, Audre Lorde's The Cancer Journals, Kathy Acker's "The Gift of Disease", and Susan Sontag’s Illness as Metaphor are often evoked in reviews. Anna Picard writes for The Times Literary Supplement, that Boyer's memoir joins "the slender library of literary, as opposed to journalistic, responses to breast cancer and breast cancer treatment."

"The Undying is not an individual tale of redemption, nor an atomised story of suffering", writes Elisa Adami for Art Monthly. "Countering the lonesome desolation of illness that oncological praxis and society's own entrenched custom of segregation work to produce, Boyer strives to address and call into being a collectivity of the sick. In the revelatory light of 'pain's leaking democracy', the book attests to the vital need for collective and social remedies for healing not just our sick bodies but the sick world we inhabit too."

=== Awards and honours ===
- 2020: Pulitzer Prize for General Nonfiction, winner
- 2020: PEN/Jean Stein Book Award, finalist

== Editions ==
- Anne Boyer (17 September 2019). The Undying: Pain, Vulnerability, Mortality, Medicine, Art, Time, Dreams, Data, Exhaustion, Cancer, and Care. Farrar, Straus and Giroux. ISBN 978-0-374-27934-9.
- Audiobook narrated by Amy Finegan, published by Recorded Books, Inc. and Blackstone Publishing, 15 November 2019
- E-book editions
