= Anne Boyer =

American poet and essayist

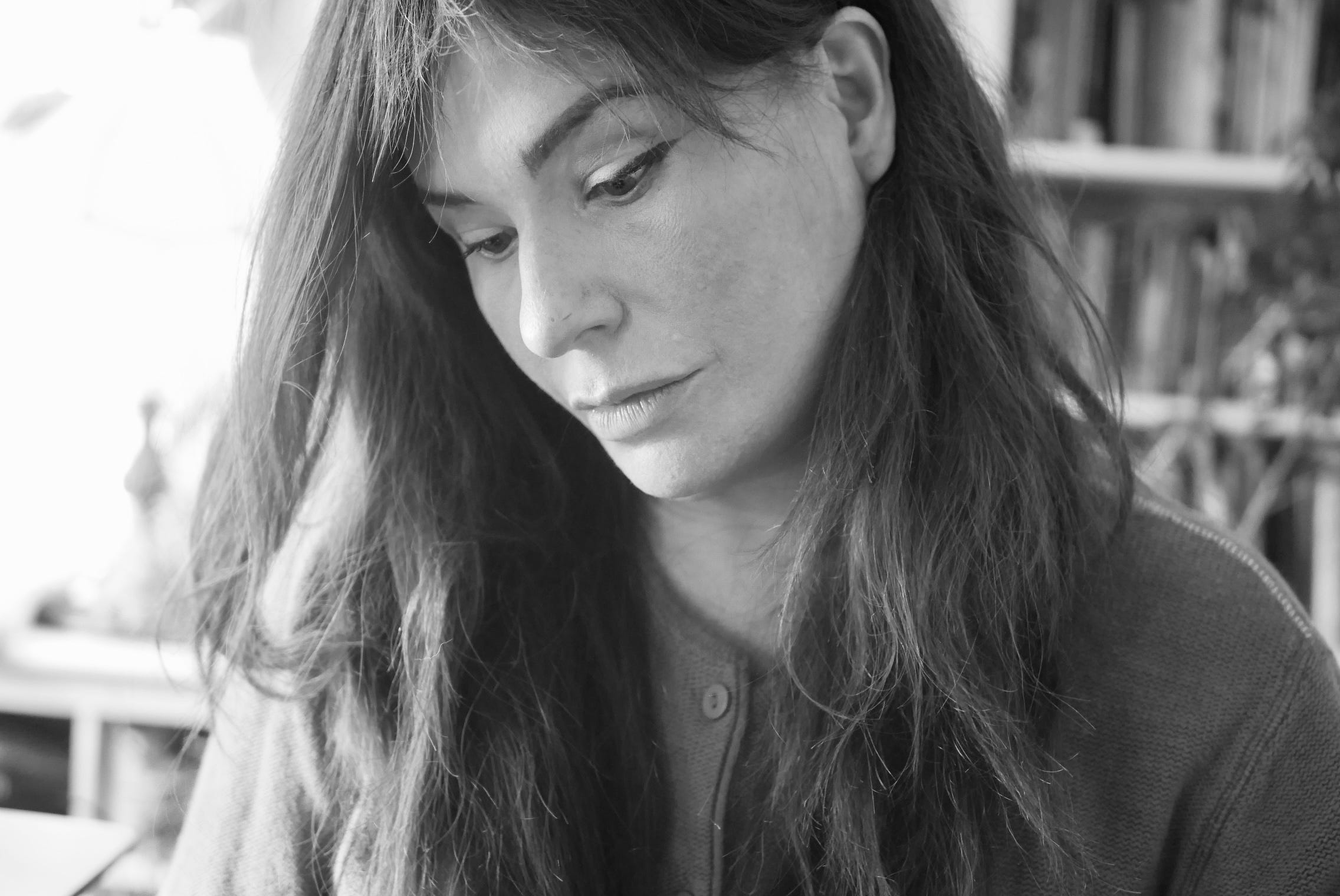
- Portrait of Anne Boyer
- Born: 1973 (age 52–53) Topeka, Kansas
- Education: Kansas State University (BA); Wichita State University (MFA)
- Genres: essay, memoir, poetry
- Notable awards: Whiting Award for Nonfiction, Poetry (2018); Pulitzer Prize for General Nonfiction (2020); Windham-Campbell Literature Prize for Nonfiction (2020)

Anne Boyer (born 1973) is an American poet and essayist. She is the author of The Romance of Happy Workers (2008), The 2000s (2009), My Common Heart (2011), Garments Against Women (2015), The Handbook of Disappointed Fate (2018), and The Undying: Pain, Vulnerability, Mortality, Medicine, Art, Time, Dreams, Data, Exhaustion, Cancer, and Care (2019).

In 2016, she was a featured blogger at the Poetry Foundation, where she wrote an ongoing series of posts about her diagnosis and treatment for a highly aggressive form of breast cancer, as well as the lives and near deaths of poets. Her essays about illness have appeared in Guernica, The New Inquiry, Fullstop, and more. Boyer teaches at the University of St Andrews in Scotland.

Her poetry, essays, and books have been translated into numerous languages including Icelandic, Spanish, Chinese, French, Hungarian, Persian, and Swedish. With Guillermo Parra and Cassandra Gillig, she has translated the work of 20th century Venezuelan poets Victor Valera Mora, Miguel James, and Miyo Vestrini.

In 2020, Boyer was awarded the Pulitzer Prize for General Nonfiction for her book The Undying: Pain, Vulnerability, Mortality, Medicine, Art, Time, Dreams, Data, Exhaustion, Cancer, and Care.

== Life and career ==
Anne Boyer was born in Topeka, Kansas in 1973 and grew up in Salina, Kansas where she was educated in public schools. She earned a BA in English literature from Kansas State University in 1996 and an MFA in poetry from Wichita State University in 1997. She has taught at the University of St Andrews since 2023, having previously taught at the Kansas City Art Institute (2007–2023) and Drake University (2005–2007). In 2018-2019 she was the Judith E. Wilson Poetry Fellow at the University of Cambridge, and in 2023 she was the Louis D. Rubin Jr. Writer-in-Residence at Hollins University. Her diagnosis and treatment of breast cancer has become the subject of her current work, examining the intersection of social class and medical care.

Boyer is the winner of the 2018 Cy Twombly Award in Poetry from the Foundation for Contemporary Arts, and her book Garments Against Women won the 2016 Community of Literary Magazines and Presses Firecracker Award in poetry. She was also named "The Best Writer in Kansas City" by The Pitch. In 2018, she also won the Whiting Award in Nonfiction/Poetry.

In March 2020, Boyer was awarded the Windham-Campbell Literature Prize.

She resigned from her role as the poetry editor of The New York Times Magazine in November 2023, in protest at the newspaper's coverage of the Gaza war. In her resignation letter, she wrote "the Israeli state’s U.S.-backed war against the people of Gaza is not a war for anyone" and that she "won’t write about poetry amid the ‘reasonable’ tones of those who aim to acclimatize us to this unreasonable suffering. No more ghoulish euphemisms. No more verbally sanitized hellscapes. No more warmongering lies.".

== Critical reception ==
Boyer's 2015 book Garments Against Women spent six months at the top of the Small Press Distribution's best seller list in poetry. The New York Times called it "a sad, beautiful, passionate book that registers the political economy of life and literature itself."

Chris Stroffolino at The Rumpus described it as "widening the boundaries of poetry and memoir."

Garments Against Women was described by Publishers Weekly as a book that "faces the material and philosophical problems of writing—and by extension, living—in the contemporary world. Boyer attempts to abandon literature in the same moments that she forms it, turning to sources as diverse as Jean-Jacques Rousseau, the acts of sewing and garment production, and a book on happiness that she finds in a thrift store. Her book, then, becomes filled with other books, imagined and resisted."

The Undying: Pain, Vulnerability, Mortality, Medicine, Art, Time, Dreams, Data, Exhaustion, Cancer, and Care tied for winner of the 2020 Pulitzer Prize for General Nonfiction.

== Works ==
- Anne Boyer's Good Apocalypse. Effing Press, 2006.
- Selected Dreams with a note on Phrenology. Dusie, 2007.
- The Romance of Happy Workers. Minneapolis, Minnesota: Coffee House Press, 2008. ISBN 9781566892148
- Art is War. Lawrence, Kansas: Mitzvah Chaps, 2008.
- The 2000s: A history of the future in advance of itself. 2009.
- My Common Heart. Spooky Girlfriend Press, 2011
- A Form of Sabotage. 2013.
- Garments Against Women. Boise, Idaho: Ahsahta Press, 2015. ISBN 9781934103593
- A Handbook of Disappointed Fate. Brooklyn, New York: Ugly Duckling Presse, 2018. ISBN 9781937027926
- Money City Sick as Fuck. London: Materials, 2019.
- The Undying: Pain, vulnerability, mortality, medicine, art, time, dreams, data, exhaustion, cancer, and care. New York, New York: Farrar, Straus and Giroux, 2019. ISBN 9780374279349
