= How Markets Fail =

How Markets Fail: The Logic of Economic Calamities
- Softcover edition
- Author: John Cassidy
- Language: English
- Subject: Economic theory
- Genre: Nonfiction
- Publisher: FSG
- Publication date: 2009
- Publication place: United States
- Media type: Print (hardback & paperback)
- Pages: 400 pp.
- ISBN: 978-0-374-17320-3
- Preceded by: Dot.con: The Greatest Story Ever Sold

How Markets Fail: The Logic of Economic Calamities is a book by journalist and economic historian John Cassidy. The book was published in 2009 by Farrar, Straus and Giroux.

== Overview ==
The book examines the history of economic theory and attempts to diagnose the recent rise and fall of markets, particularly the housing bubble and credit crisis (2007–2009).

How Markets Fail argues against unfettered free-market ideology and supports government regulation in the financial industry.

== Reception ==
Kirkus, giving it a starred review, remarked, "Cassidy delivers on the promise of his title, but he also offers a clear-eyed look at economic thinking over the last three centuries, from Adam Smith to Ben Bernanke, and shows how the major theories have played out in practice, often not well." Robert M. Solow of The New Republic said Cassidy lays out well how a competitive market economy in equilibrium will achieve efficient resource allocation. He said that How Markets Fail "should confer on a thoughtful reader a lasting immunity to erroneous free-market sloganeering, whether simpleminded or devious, while still conveying some feeling for what a well-functioning market system can actually do. Both ideas are important."

Robert Pollin of Monthly Review described How Markets Fail as "a work of considerable scope, offering fresh perspectives on a wide range of topics". He said the first two sections summarizing freshwater and saltwater economics "are not dry and intimidating [...] Cassidy’s writing in these chapters is clear and lively." Pollin also credited Cassidy as "the first widely read commentator to give the great financial macroeconomist Hyman Minsky and [...] Monthly Review founding coeditor Paul Sweezy their due, as two of a tiny handful of people who recognized and warned about the patterns". However, Pollin also says the journalist "never focuses seriously on how we might translate the insights of reality-based economics into a workable set of policies and institutions".

Bob Frick recommended it as the best book about the causes of the Great Recession and referred to it as "a damning story of how economics drives government policies that promote bubbles [...] You should read this excellent book". Ivan Fallon of The Independent stated, "He writes more as the economic historian which he is at heart than as the journalist he is in practice, with a cool and authoritative perception of the key elements which caused the huge boom and the even bigger bust of the past decade."

The Globe and Mail's Janice Gross Stein wrote, "What John Cassidy teaches us in his fluent and lucid narrative of how markets fail is that there is no silver bullet, no single coherent set of ideas that can 'fix' the global economy. [...] Markets have always needed regulation and societies have always needed dynamic, innovative markets." Richard N. Cooper of Foreign Affairs praised it as "highly readable [...] a clear and occasionally colorful exposition of the evolution of relevant economic thought in a way that is accessible to non-economists."

The Economist praised the book, noting that its critique of "free market idolatry" was, in the wake of the 2008 financial crisis, "firmly in the mainstream". The Daily Telegraph's Jeff Randall called it "excellent", saying Cassidy "is blessed with a rare combination of writing skills and intellectual hinterland, and has produced a fresh and engaging explanation of the calamity [...] His book combines thorough research with scholarly insights and the classy prose that has become his hallmark". Randall said that the author's explanation for how markets fail is as follows: "Presented with what looks like money for nothing, the crowd goes mad."

The Financial Times review by Gillian Tett likewise praised the book as "compelling and persuasive", praising the book's criticism of government's excessive trust in free market principles, and its account of how the "modern economics profession" had "lost its way". Peter Clarke of New Statesman called it "engaging" and wrote that "Cassidy is able to lead us with beguiling lucidity through unfamiliar territory." He argued that the book "does not claim to have all the answers, but it deftly illuminates some crucial problems in the light of our recent experiences." Paul M. Barrett of The New York Times, in a review of both How Markets Fail and Andrew Ross Sorkin's Too Big to Fail, said that the former "offers a brilliant intellectual framework" for Sorkin's narrative. Robert P. Murphy criticized statements Cassidy made against free-market economics in an NPR interview promoting the book, arguing that Cassidy "caricatures the case for free markets" and that the "proper way to avoid bankrupting the taxpayers is to stop bailing out big banks."
