= Howard Mumford Jones =

Howard Mumford Jones (April 16, 1892 – May 11, 1980) was an American intellectual historian, literary critic, journalist, poet, and professor of English at the University of Michigan and later at Harvard University.

Jones was the book editor for The Boston Evening Transcript.

== Background ==
Howard Mumford Jones was born on April 16, 1892, in Saginaw, Michigan. He attended the University of Wisconsin–Madison as an undergraduate, winning oratorical contests there

== Career ==
Before moving to Harvard University, Jones was a member of the English faculty at the University of North Carolina at Chapel Hill. In 1925 he approached president Harry Woodburn Chase, lamenting the absence of a bookstore in the town of Chapel Hill, and offered to open one in his office. This eventually became the Bull's Head Bookshop, now located in Student Stores.

In February 1954, Jones gave the dedicatory address at the opening of an addition to the University of Wisconsin's Memorial Library, entitled "Books and the Independent Mind." The crux of his comments was contained in this comment: "While it is true that we in this nation remain free to be idiotic, it does not necessarily follow that we must be idiotic in order to be free!"

== Personal life and death ==
In 1927, Jones married the former Bessie Judith Zaban, of Atlanta, Georgia, in New York City, and they remained married until his death.

Howard Mumford Jones died age 88 on May 11, 1980, in Cambridge, Massachusetts, after a brief illness.

== Awards and honors ==
- 1938: elected to the American Academy of Arts and Sciences
- 1941: elected to the American Philosophical Society
- 1965: Pulitzer Prize for General Nonfiction for O Strange New World: American Culture-The Formative Years.

== Legacy ==
The Howard Mumford Jones Professorship of American Studies at Harvard University is named in his honor.

== Quotations ==
- "Ours is the age which is proud of machines that think and suspicious of men who try to."

== Works ==
Jones wrote scholarly articles as well as the following books:

- Gargoyles and Other Poems (Boston, Mass.: The Cornhill Company, 1918) read online
- America and French Culture: 1750-1848 (University of North Carolina Press, 1927) read online
- The Harp That Once: A Chronicle of the Life of Thomas Moore (New York: Henry Holt, 1937)
- Ideas in America (Russell & Russell, 1944) read online
- The Bright Medusa (University of Illinois Press, 1952) read online
- The Pursuit of Happiness (Harvard University Press, 1953) read online
- American Humanism: Its Meaning for World Survival (New York: Harper, 1957) read online
- One Great Society: Humane Learning in the United States (NY: Harcourt, Brace, 1959) read online
- The Scholar as American (Harvard University Press, 1960) read online
- Humane Traditions in America: A List of Suggested Readings, Volume 1 (Harvard University Press, 1961) read online
- The University and the New World (University of Toronto Press, 1963) read online
- O Strange New World: American Culture—The Formative Years (Viking Press, 1964) (Pulitzer Prize for General Nonfiction)
- History and the Contemporary: Essays in Nineteenth-Century Literature (University of Wisconsin Press, 1964) read online
- Belief and Disbelief in American Culture (University of Chicago Press, 1969) read online
- The Age of Energy: Varieties of American Experience, 1865-1915 (Viking Press, 1971) read online
- Revolution and Romanticism (Harvard University Press, 1974) read online
- Howard Mumford Jones: An Autobiography (1979) read online

Jones also wrote the introduction to Thomas Wentworth Higginson's book Army Life in a Black Regiment (Michigan State University Press, 1960).
