= Robert N. Butler =

American academic (1927–2010)

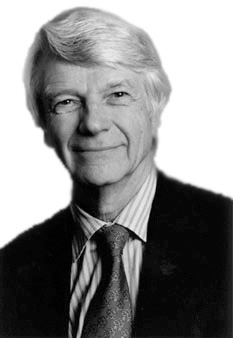
- Butler in 2004
- Born: Robert Neil Butler; January 21, 1927; New York, New York, US
- Died: July 4, 2010 (aged 83); New York, New York, US
- Education: Columbia University (BA, MD)
- Awards: Pulitzer Prize (1976)
- Scientific career
- Fields: Gerontology; psychiatry

Robert Neil Butler (January 21, 1927 – July 4, 2010) was an American physician, gerontologist, psychiatrist, and author, who was the first director of the National Institute on Aging. Butler is known for his work on the social needs and the rights of the elderly and for his research on healthy aging and the dementias.

== Background ==
Having grown up with his grandparents in Vineland, New Jersey, Butler was shocked by the dismissive and contemptuous attitude toward the elderly and their diseases by many of his teachers at medical school, an attitude he later characterized as "ageism".

He graduated from Columbia College of Columbia University, where he was editor of the Columbia Daily Spectator and a member of the Philolexian Society.

== Career ==
Butler was a principal investigator of one of the first interdisciplinary, comprehensive, longitudinal studies of healthy community-residing older persons, conducted at the National Institute of Mental Health (1955–1966), which resulted in the landmark book Human Aging. His research helped establish the fact that senility was not inevitable with aging, but is a consequence of disease.

In his 1961 essay, “The Life Review: An Interpretation of Reminiscence in the Aged,” Butler introduces the concept of life review as a natural psychological process later in life. Butler suggests that reminiscence among older people is not a meaningless process, but one that can help individuals to resolve conflicts and reflect on their life events. Butler’s concept of life review has also been used more formally in therapeutic contexts when the review is guided by a professional.

In 1969, he coined the term ageism to describe discrimination against seniors; the term was patterned on sexism and racism. Butler defined "ageism" as a combination of three connected elements. Among them were prejudicial attitudes towards older people, old age, and the aging process; discriminatory practices against older people; and institutional practices and policies that perpetuate stereotypes about elderly people.

In 1975, he became the founding Director of the National Institute on Aging (NIA) of the National Institutes of Health, where he remained until 1982. At the National Institute on Aging he established Alzheimer's disease as a national research priority.

In 1982, he founded the Department of Geriatrics and Adult Development at the Mount Sinai Medical Center, the first department of geriatrics in a United States medical school. In addition, Butler helped found the Alzheimer's Disease Association, the American Association of Geriatric Psychiatry, the American Federation for Aging Research and the Alliance for Aging Research.

Butler was the founder, chief executive officer, and president of the International Longevity Center-USA, a non-profit international organization created to educate people on how to live longer and better. The International Longevity Center-USA is now housed at the Robert N. Butler Columbia Aging Center, a university-wide center of Columbia University based at the Mailman School of Public Health

== Publications ==
Butler is best known for his 1975 book Why Survive? Being Old In America, which won the Pulitzer Prize for General Nonfiction in 1976. A 2003 paperback edition is currently available (ISBN 0-8018-7425-4).

=== Recent books ===
- Aging and Mental Health: Positive Psychosocial and Biomedical Approaches (with Myrna I. Lewis and Trey Sunderland, 1998) (ISBN 978-0205193363)
- Life in an Older America (2001) (ISBN 0-87078-438-2)
- The New Love and Sex After 60 (with Myrna I. Lewis, 2002) (ISBN 0-345-44211-3)
- The Longevity Prescription: The 8 Proven Keys to a Long, Healthy Life, 2010 (ISBN 1583333886; ISBN 978-1-58333-388-4).

Butler authored 300 scientific and medical articles.

== Awards ==
Butler was the recipient of the 10th Annual Heinz Award in the Human Condition category. The award recognized his work in advancing the rights and needs of the nation's aging citizenry and enhancing the quality of life for elderly Americans.

He received honorary degrees from the University of Gothenburg in Sweden and the University of Southern California as well as other awards such as the Lienhard Medal of the Institute of Medicine and a Hall of Fame Award from the American Society of Aging.

== Film appearance ==
Butler is featured in the 2009 documentary film, I Remember Better When I Paint, which examines the positive impact of art on people with Alzheimer's disease and how these approaches can change the way the disease is viewed by society.
