= 1980 Pulitzer Prize =

Awards for journalism and related fields

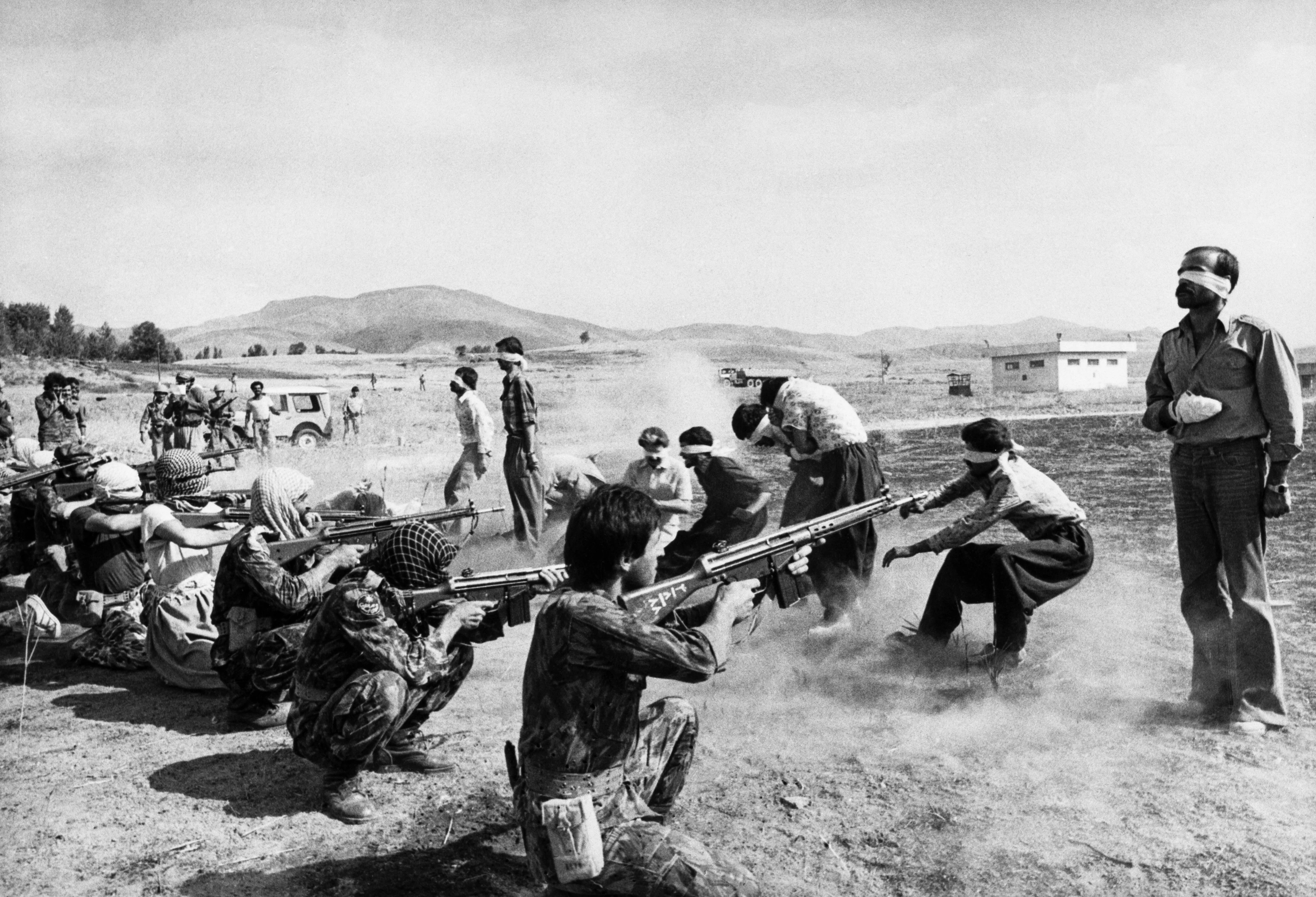
"Firing Squad in Iran", the prize-winning spot news photograph

The Pulitzer Prizes for 1980 were announced on April 14, 1980. A total of 1,550 entries were submitted for prizes in 19 categories of journalism and the arts. Finalists were chosen by expert juries in each category, and winners were then chosen by the 16-member Pulitzer Prize Board, presided over by Clayton Kirkpatrick. For the first time in the Prizes' history, juries were asked to name at least three finalists in each category, and the finalists were announced in addition to the winners. Each prize carried a $1,000 award, except for the Public Service prize, which came with a gold medal.

The winner in each category is listed first, in bold, followed by the other finalists.

== Journalism awards ==
- Public Service:
  - **Gannett News Service**, for "Story of the Pauline Fathers", its 18-day series on misuse of financial contributions to the Pauline Fathers.
  - The Miami Herald, for "Dangerous Doctors: A Medical Dilemma", an 8-part series on medical incompetence, malfeasance, and abuse.
  - The Miami Herald, for "Police Brutality: The Dangerous Few", a 5-part series on cases of police brutality in Dade County.
  - The Philadelphia Inquirer, for "Poison at Our Doorsteps", a series on irresponsible disposal of toxic waste.
  - St. Petersburg Times, for its investigation of the Church of Scientology. (Moved by the Board to the National Reporting category.)
- Local General or Spot News Reporting:
  - **Staff of The Philadelphia Inquirer**, for coverage of the Three Mile Island nuclear accident, including a 22,000-word recounting of the accident by 39 reporters and photographers.
  - Staff of the Chicago Tribune, for coverage of the worst air crash in US history and the blizzard of 1979.
  - Staff of the Greensboro Daily News (North Carolina), for coverage of the Greensboro massacre, a shooting at an anti-Ku Klux Klan rally.
- Local Investigative Specialized Reporting:
  - **Stephen A. Kurkjian, Alexander B. Hawes Jr., Nils Bruzelius, Joan Vennochi and Robert M. Porterfield of The Boston Globe**, for a 10-part exposé on mismanagement of the Massachusetts Bay Transportation Authority.
  - Carole E. Agus, Andrew V. Fetherston Jr., and Frederick J. Tuccillo of Newsday (Long Island, New York), for their investigation of a scandal at the Southwest Sewer District in Suffolk County.
  - Charles R. Cook and James S. Carlton of The Port Arthur News (Texas), for their exposé on the use of road oil contaminated with cyanide and other toxic chemicals, distributed by Browning-Ferris Industries.
  - Judy Grande and Brian Gallagher of The Journal News (Nyack, New York), for the 5-part series, "Getting Away with Murder", exposing the shoddy investigation and prosecution of murders in Rockland, New York.
  - Lewis M. Simons and Ron Shaffer of The Washington Post, for a series on fraud committed by officials of a low-income housing organization, P.I. Properties, including Marion Barry's ex-wife.
- National Reporting:
  - **Bette Swenson Orsini and Charles Stafford of the St. Petersburg Times**, for their 16-part investigation of the Church of Scientology.
  - Joseph P. Albright of Cox Newspapers, for "Our Trillion Dollar Treasure", a series on energy policy regarding oil and gas under federally owned lands.
  - George Anthan of The Des Moines Register, for "Vanishing Acres", a 7-part series on the dwindling amount of good farmland.
  - Staff of the Los Angeles Times, for a series on chemicals in the environment, "The Poisoning of America".
- International Reporting:
  - **Joel Brinkley, reporter, and Jay Mather, photographer of The Courier-Journal**, for the 4-part series, "Living the Cambodian Nightmare", about refugees from the Cambodian–Vietnamese War.
  - Peter Arnett of the Associated Press, for "The World's Homeless", a 6-part series about international refugees, with photographs by Eddie Adams.
  - Fox Butterfield of The New York Times, for dispatches from China.
  - Staff of the Los Angeles Times, for coverage of Iran.
- Feature Writing:
  - **Madeleine Blais of The Miami Herald**, for a selection of stories profiling families and individuals, particularly "Zepp's Last Stand".
  - Bonnie M. Anderson of The Miami Herald, for "The Execution of My Father", about her father's execution during the Cuban Revolution in 1961.
  - John R. Camp of the St. Paul Pioneer Press, for a series of articles about Native American culture.
  - Saul Pett of the Associated Press, for an article on the snail darter controversy.
- Commentary:
  - **Ellen H. Goodman of The Boston Globe**, for her syndicated daily column, commenting on a variety of topics.
  - Richard Reeves of Universal Press Syndicate, for his syndicated political column.
  - Carl T. Rowan of the Chicago Sun-Times and Syndicate, for his syndicated column.
- Criticism:
  - **William A. Henry III of The Boston Globe**, for critical writing about television.
  - William C. Glackin of The Sacramento Bee, for his drama and music reviews.
  - William K. Robertson of The Miami Herald, for a collection of columns and book reviews.
- Editorial Writing:
  - **Robert L. Bartley of The Wall Street Journal**, for editorials on a variety of topics.
  - John Alexander of the Greensboro Daily News (North Carolina), for editorials about the Greensboro massacre.
  - Alfred Ames and Joan Beck of the Chicago Tribune
  - Bruce C. Davidson, Thomas N. Oliphant, and Anne C. Wyman of The Boston Globe, for the 8-part series, "Search for an Energy Policy".
  - Tom Dearmore of the San Francisco Examiner, for editorials on a variety of topics.
- Editorial Cartooning:
  - **Don Wright of The Miami News**, for his cartoons, exemplified by "Florida State Prison".
  - Richard Locher of the Chicago Tribune
  - Paul Szep of The Boston Globe

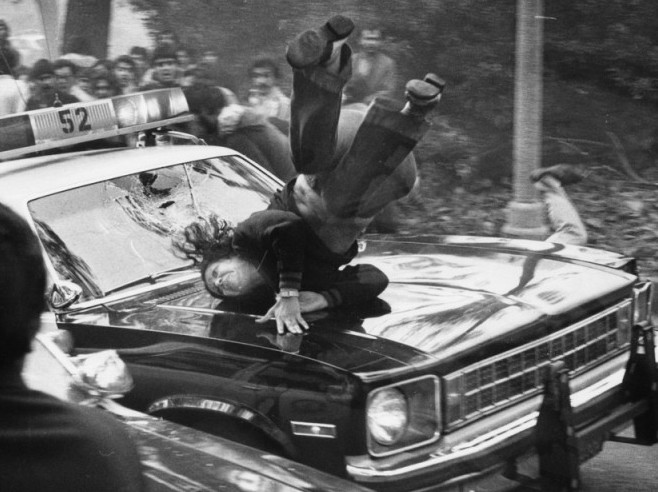
Spot News finalist photo by Michael Haering, of a protester struck by a car at a demonstration in Beverly Hills

- Spot News Photography:
  - **Anonymous, distributed by United Press International.** (In 2006, the photographer was identified as Jahangir Razmi of Ettela'at), for "Firing Squad in Iran", depicting the execution of prisoners in the 1979 Kurdish rebellion by an Iranian government firing squad.
  - Robert L. Gay of the Charleston Daily Mail (West Virginia), for a series on a crazed veteran holding 29 hostages in a church.
  - Michael Haering of the Los Angeles Herald Examiner, for a photo of a woman being struck by a car at a demonstration outside the house of the Shah of Iran's sister in Beverly Hills.
- Feature Photography:
  - **Erwin H. Hagler of The Dallas Times Herald**, for a 23-picture series documenting the life of cowboys in the Texas Panhandle.
  - David A. Kryszak of The Detroit News, for "Cambodian Exodus", a five-part photo-essay on Cambodian refugees in Thailand.
  - John J. Sunderland of The Denver Post, for photos of patients living and dying in a hospice in Lakewood, Colorado.
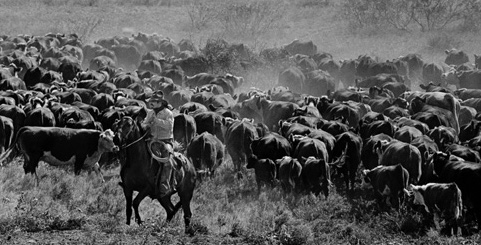
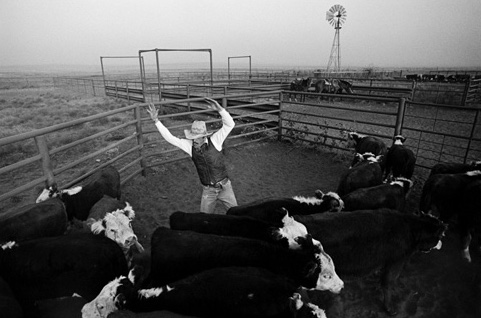
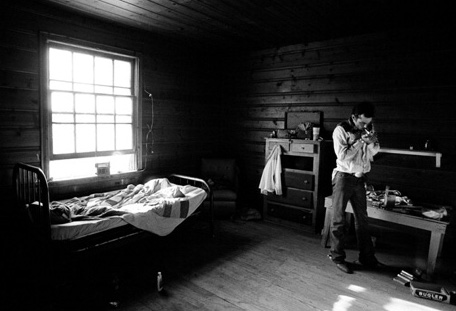
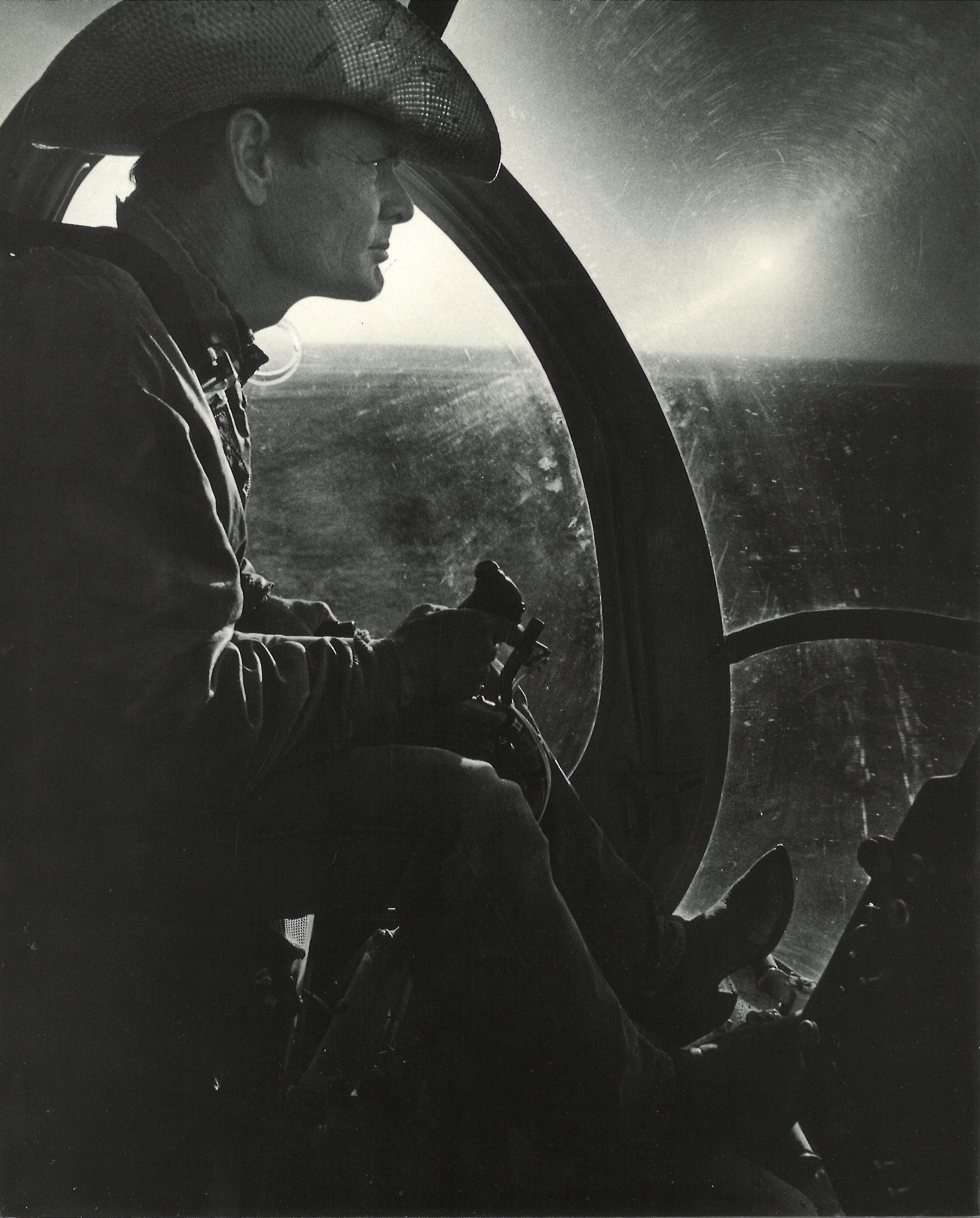
Selections of the prize-winning Feature Photography series on Texas cowboys by Erwin Hagler
The winning news organizations celebrated their prize in trade publications
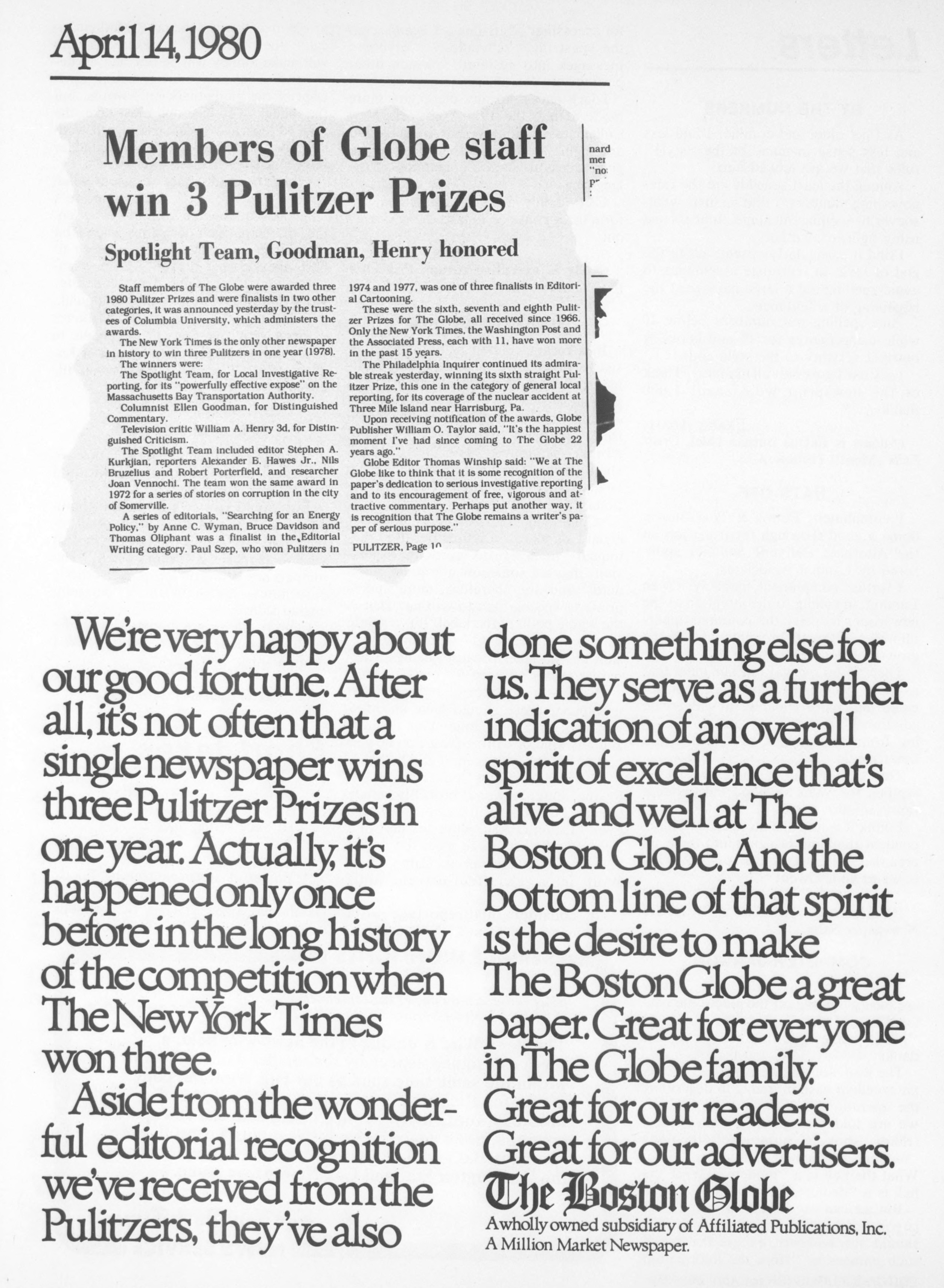
The Boston Globe

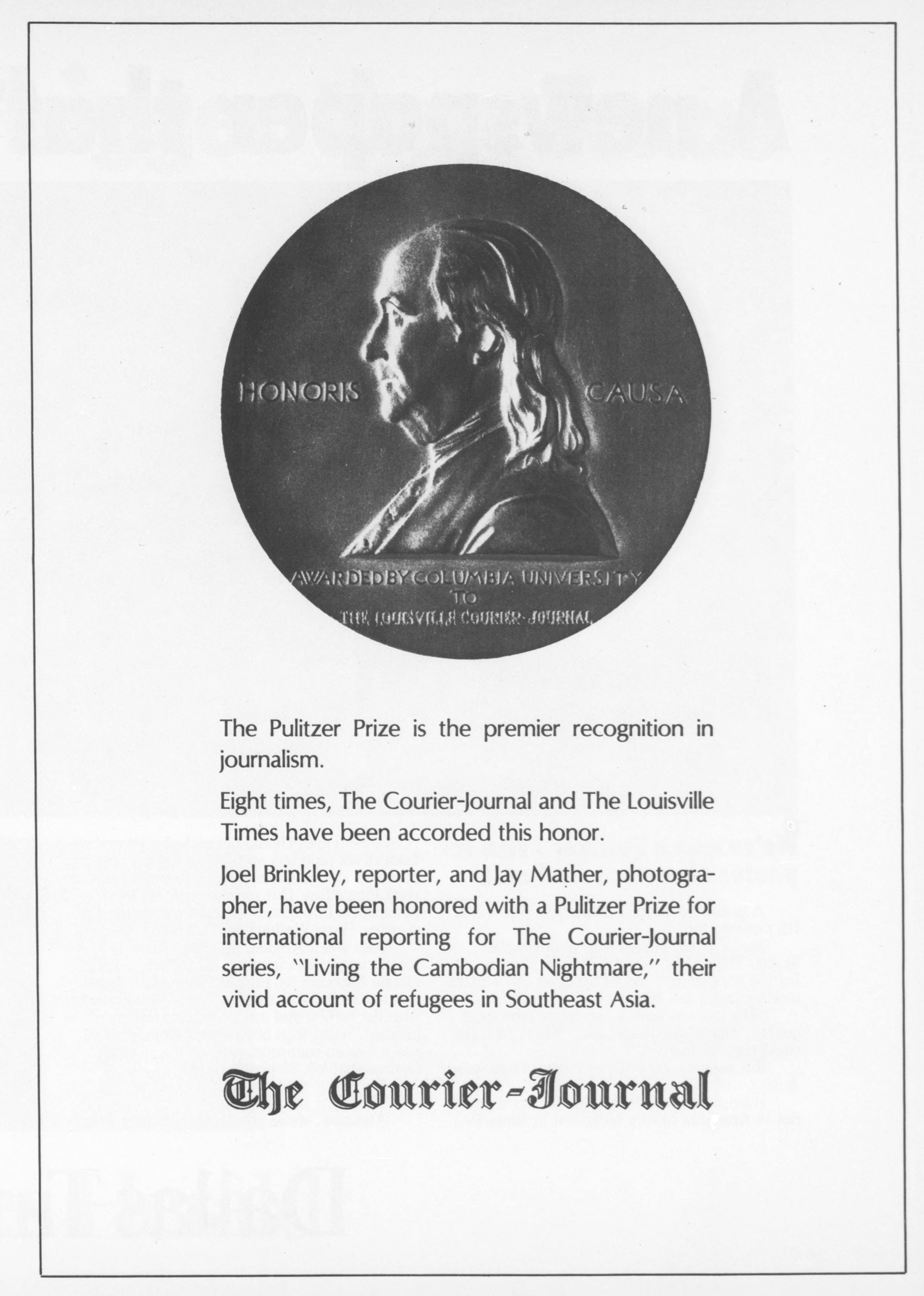
The Courier-Journal

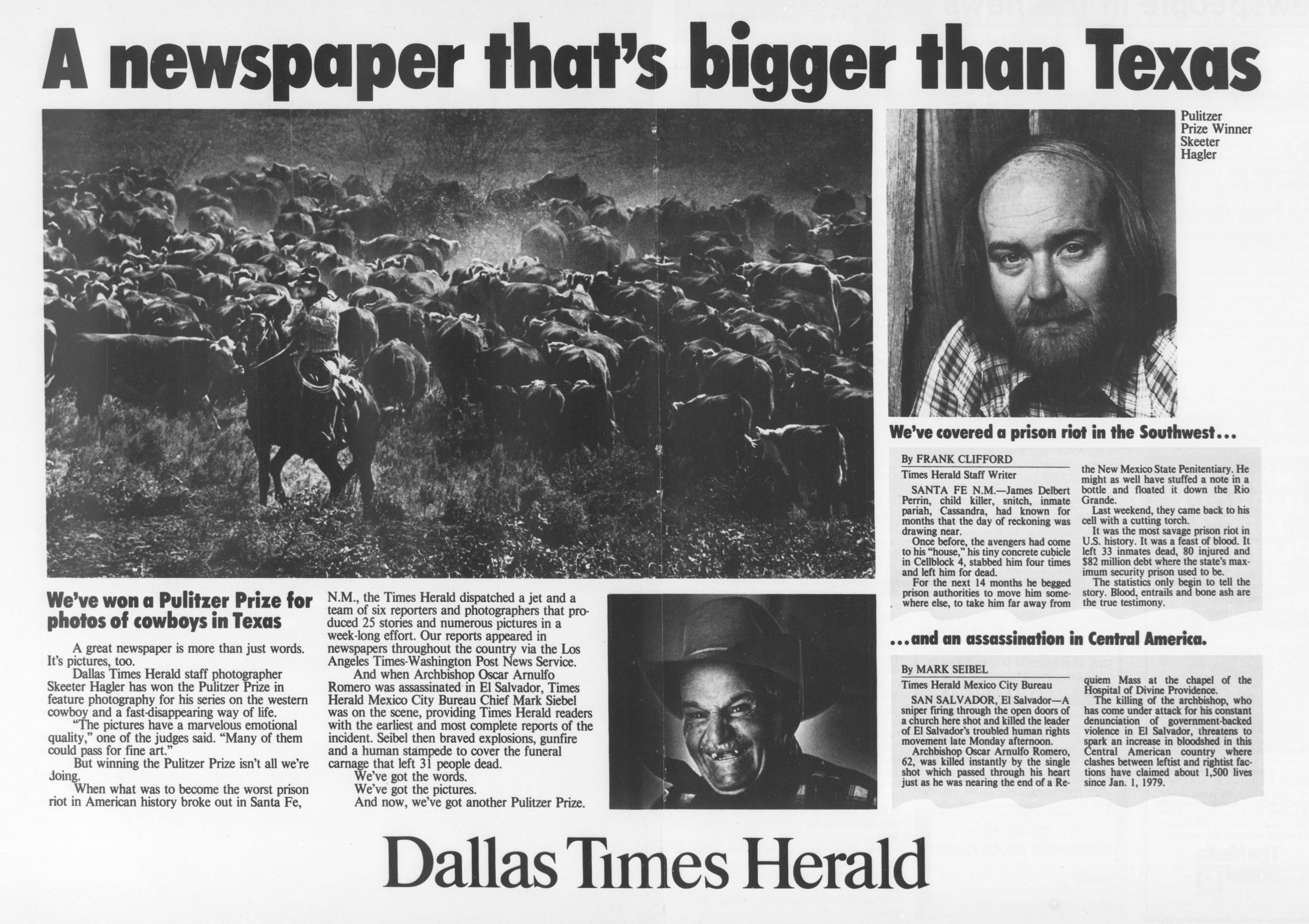
The Dallas Times Herald

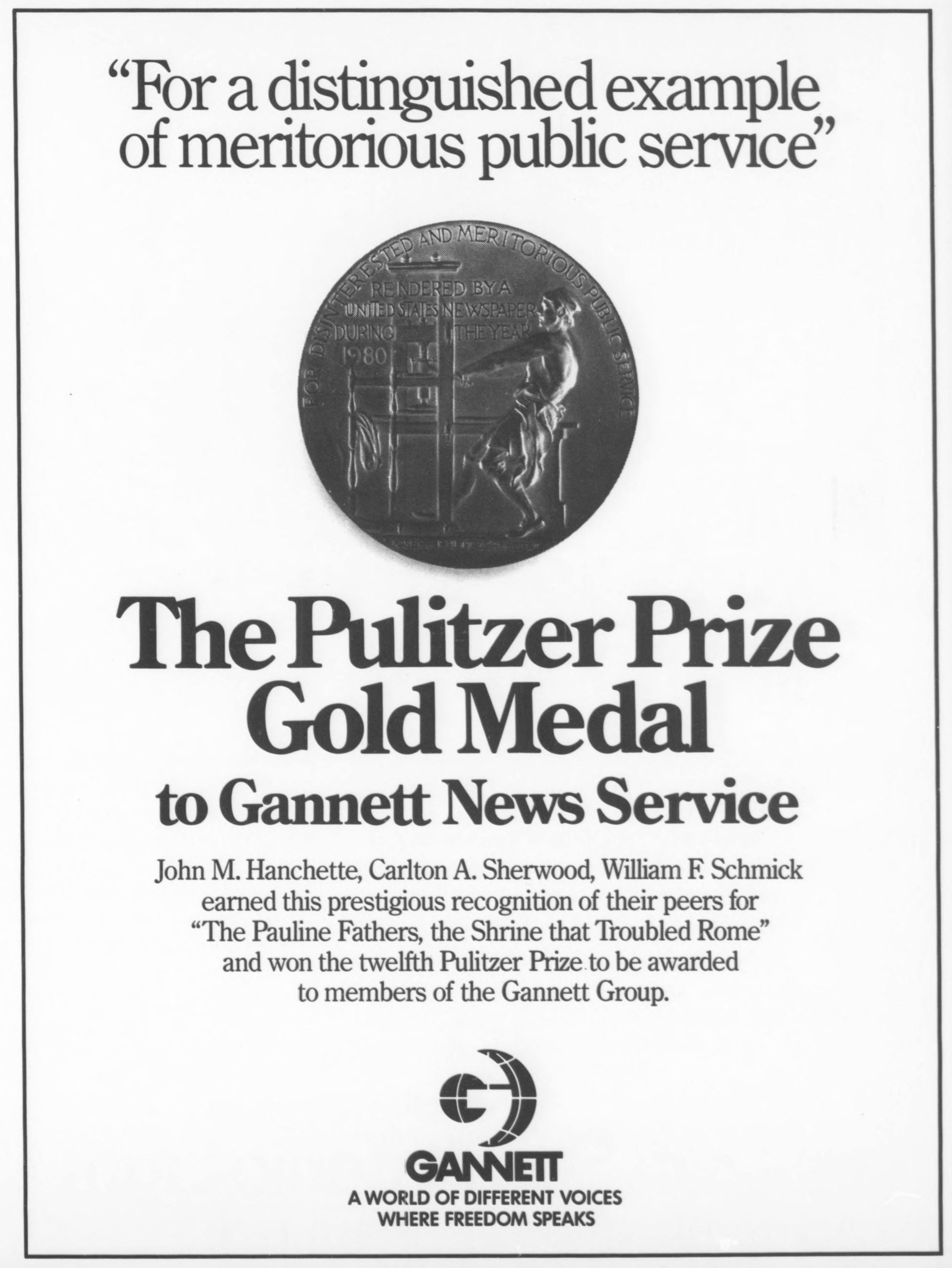
Gannett News Service

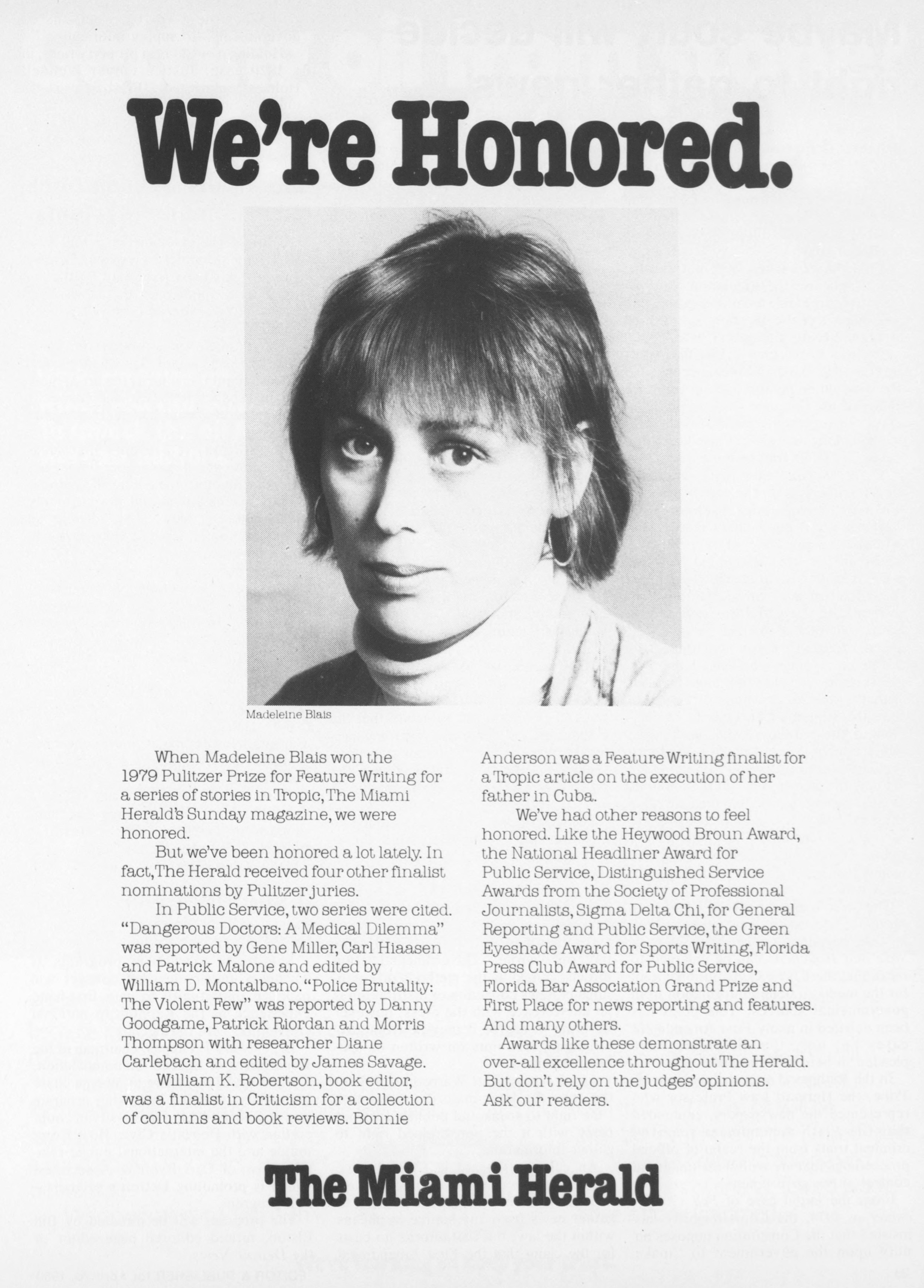
The Miami Herald

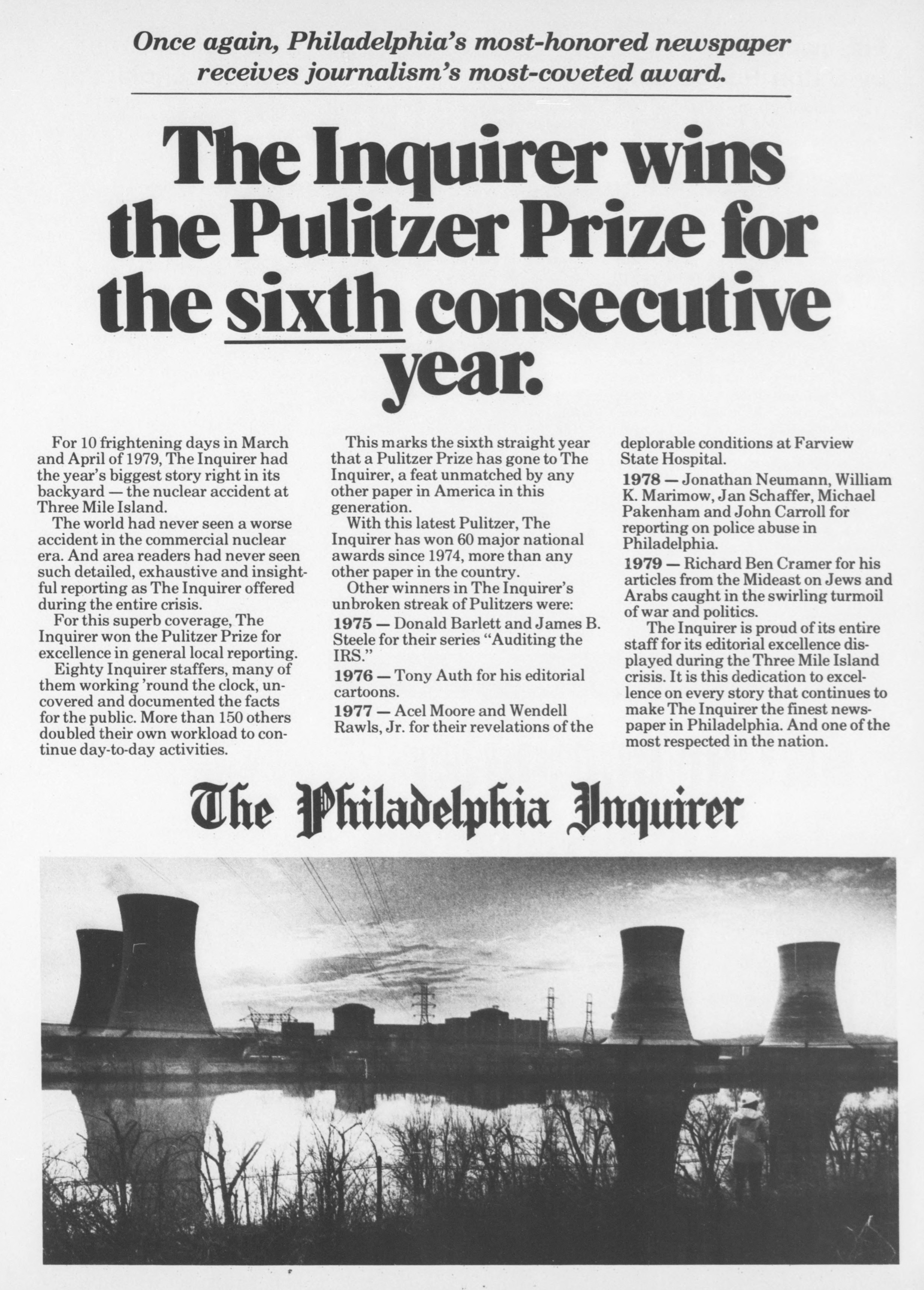
The Philadelphia Inquirer

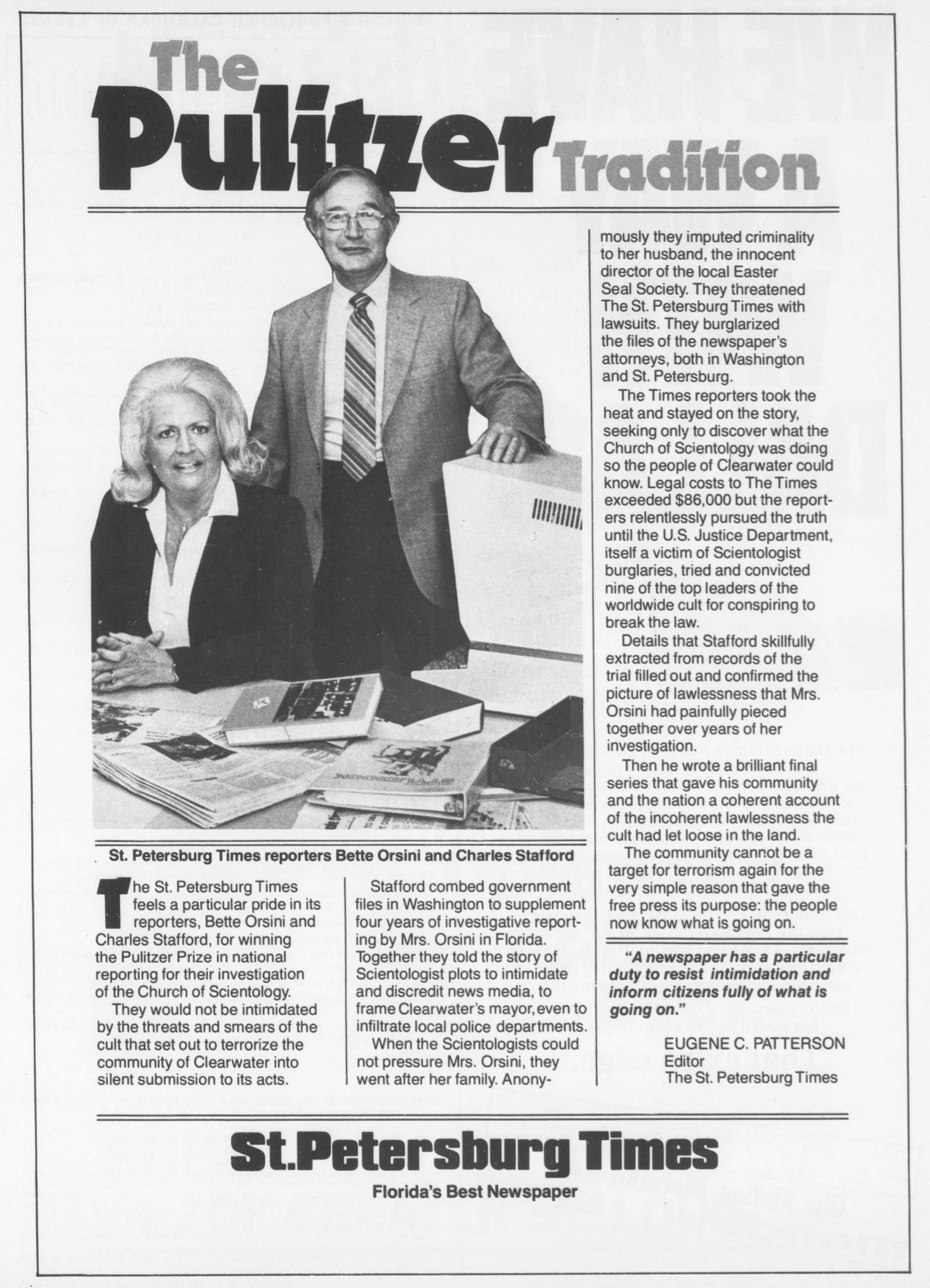
St. Petersburg Times

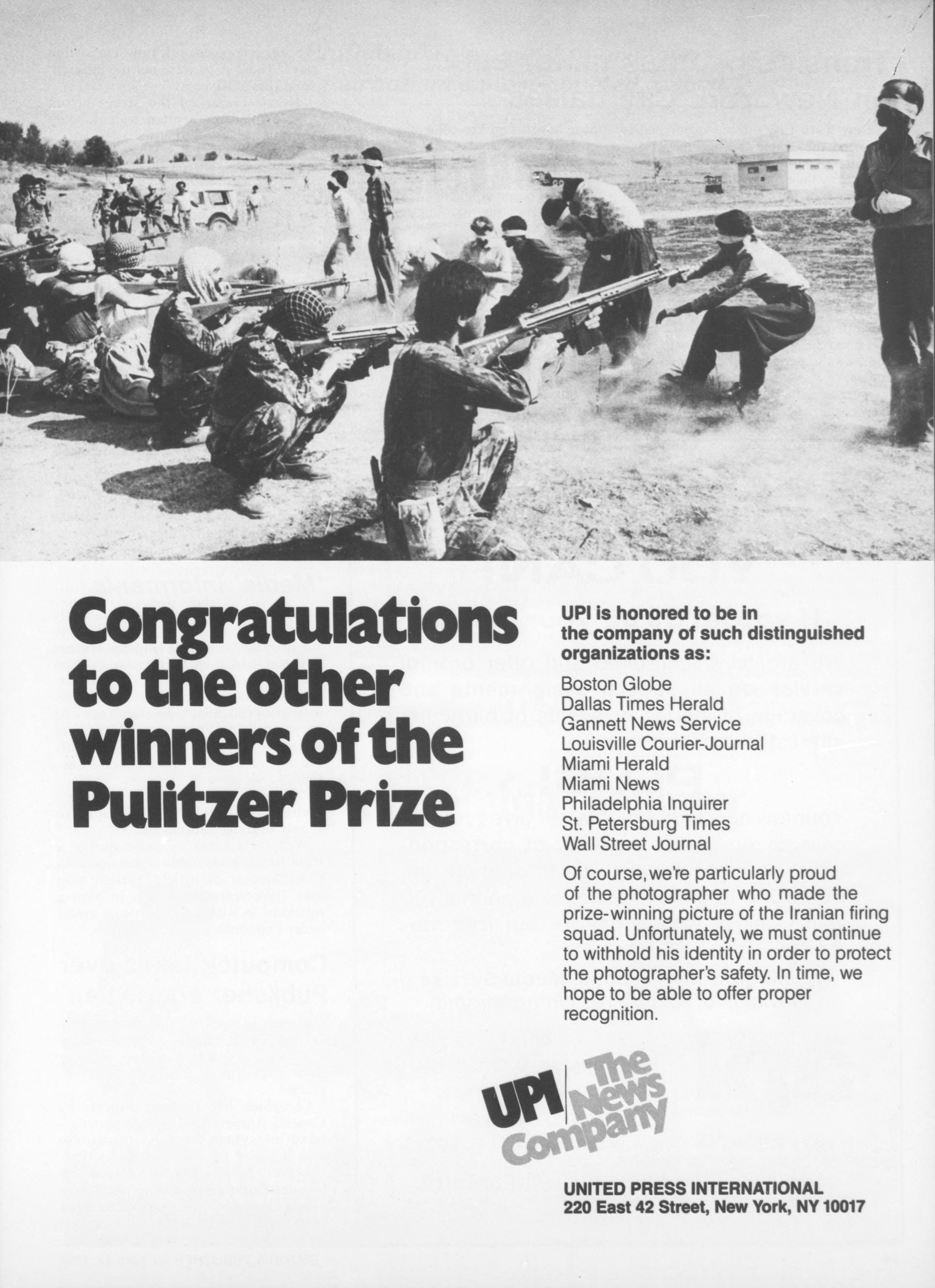
United Press International

== Letters, Drama and Music Awards ==
- Fiction:
  - **The Executioner's Song** by **Norman Mailer**
  - Birdy by William Wharton
  - The Ghost Writer by Philip Roth

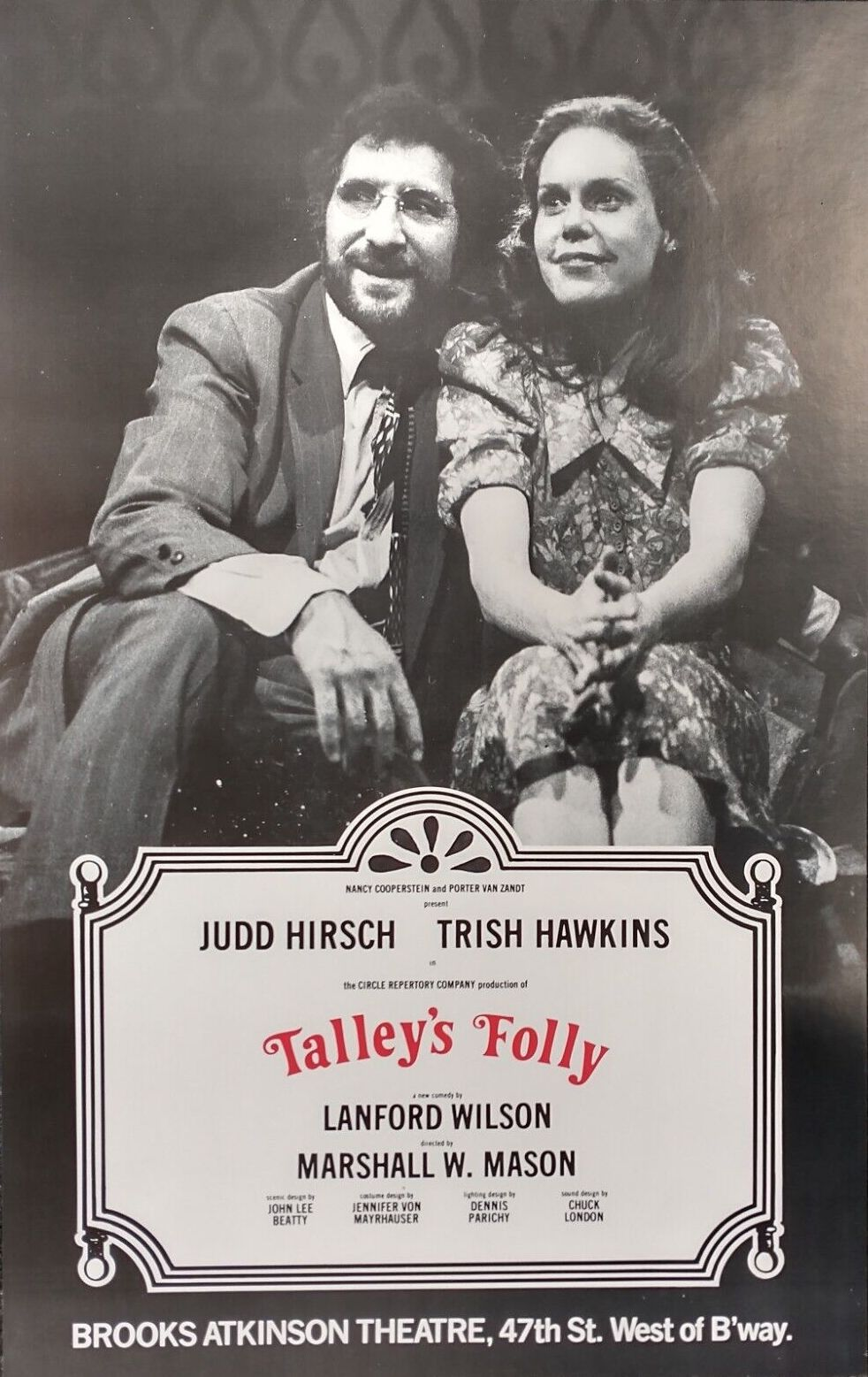
Poster for the Broadway production of the prize-winning drama, Talley's Folly

- Drama:
  - **Talley's Folly** by **Lanford Wilson**
- History:
  - **Been in the Storm So Long: The Aftermath of Slavery** by **Leon F. Litwack**
  - The Plains Across: The Overland Emigrants on the Trans-Mississippi West, 1840–60 by John D. Unruh Jr.
  - The Urban Crucible: Social Change, Political Consciousness and the Origins of the American Revolution by Gary B. Nash
- Biography or Autobiography:
  - **The Rise of Theodore Roosevelt** by **Edmund Morris**
  - Being Bernard Berenson by Meryle Secrest
  - Bernard Berenson: The Making of a Connoisseur by Ernest Samuels
  - The Duke of Deception: Memories of My Father by Geoffrey Wolff
- Poetry:
  - **Selected Poems** by **Donald Justice**
  - Goshawk, Antelope by Dave Smith
  - Selected Poems by Richard Hugo
- General Nonfiction:
  - **Gödel, Escher, Bach: an Eternal Golden Braid** by **Douglas Hofstadter**
  - The Madwoman in the Attic: The Woman Writer and the Nineteenth-Century Literary Imagination by Sandra M. Gilbert and Susan Gubar
  - The Medusa and the Snail: More Notes of a Biology Watcher by Lewis Thomas
- Music:
  - **In Memory of a Summer Day** by **David Del Tredici**
  - After the Butterfly by Morton Subotnick
  - Quintets for Orchestra by Lukas Foss
The Pulitzer Prize-winning books for 1980
The Executioner's Song

Been in the Storm So Long

The Rise of Theodore Roosevelt

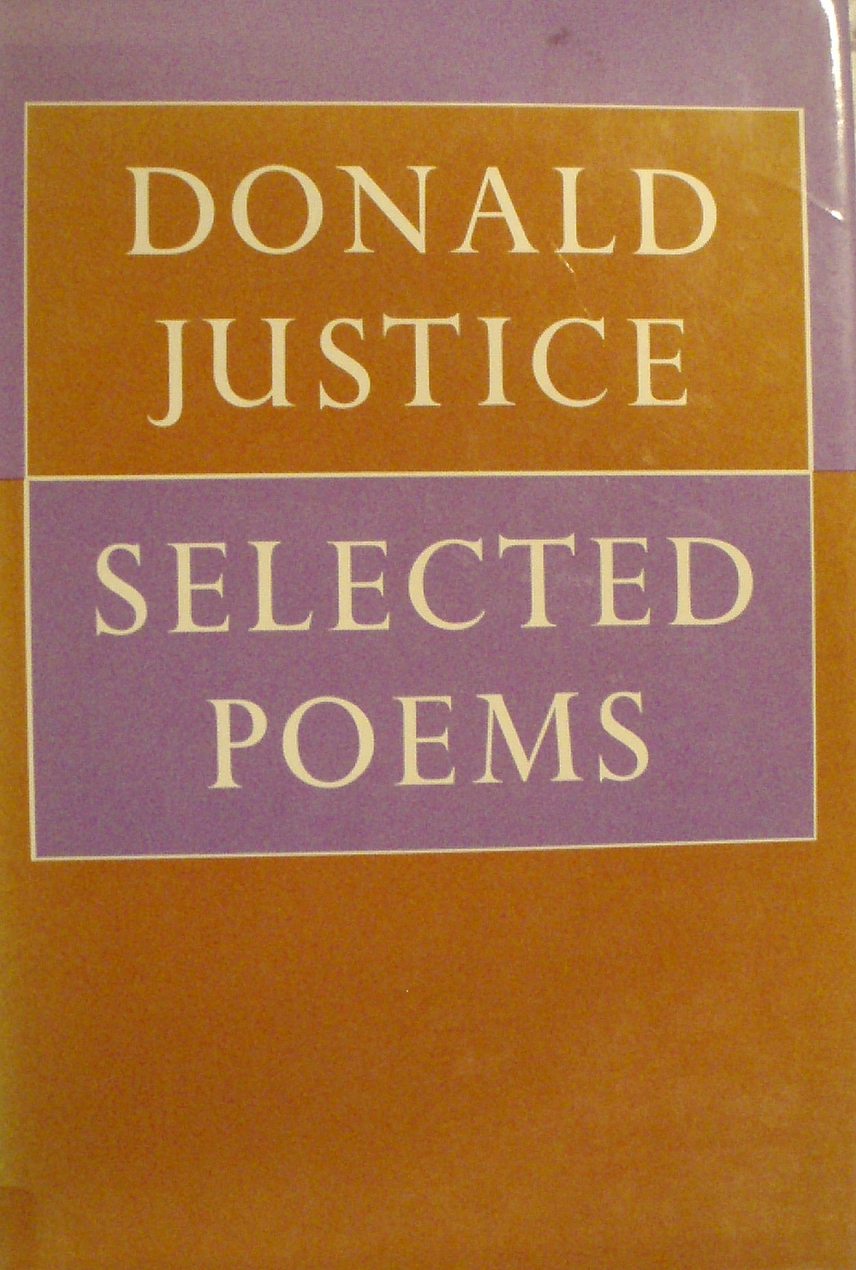
Selected Poems

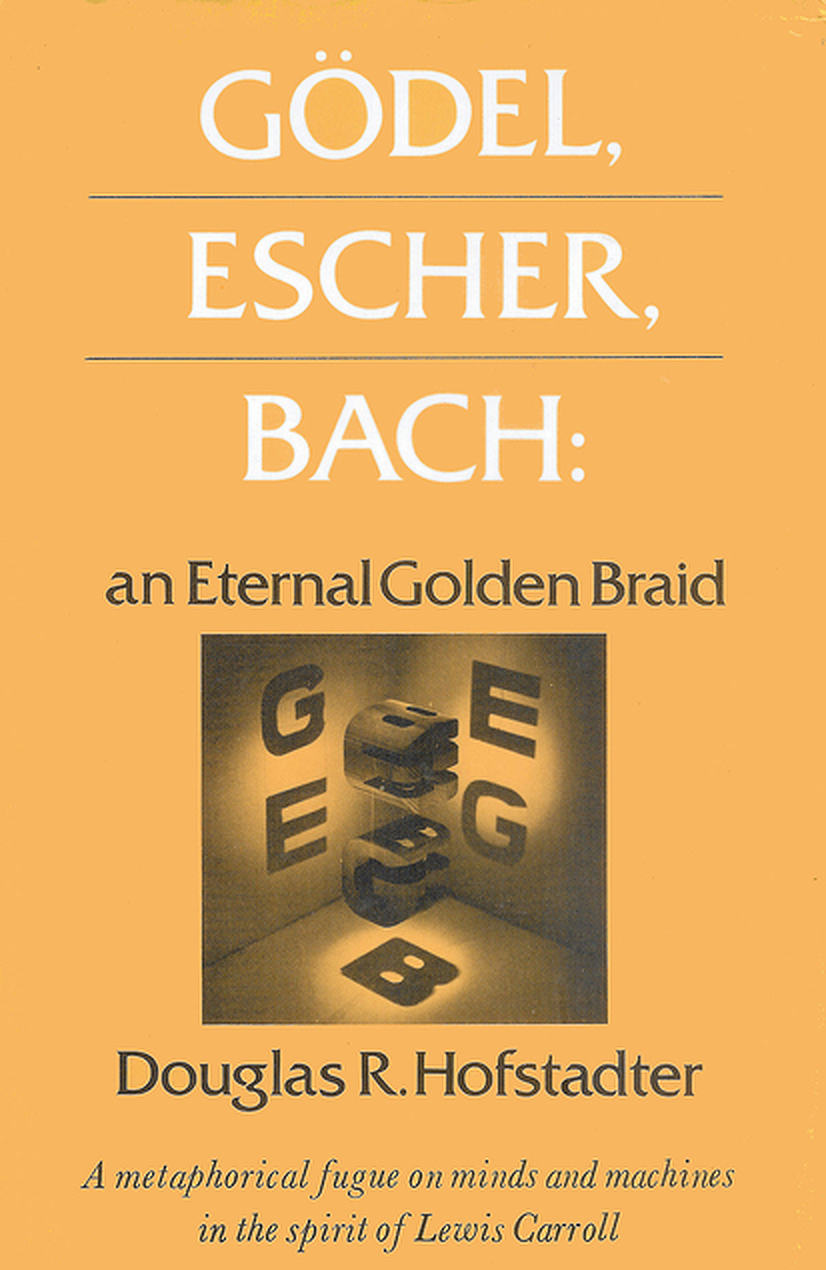
Gödel, Escher, Bach
