= Pulitzer Prize for Feature Writing =

American journalism award

The Pulitzer Prize for Feature Writing is one of the fourteen American Pulitzer Prizes that are annually awarded for Journalism. It has been awarded since 1979 for a distinguished example of feature writing giving prime consideration to high literary quality and originality.

Finalists have been announced from 1980, ordinarily two others beside the winner.

== Winners and citations ==
Year	Name(s)	Publication	Rationale
1979	Jon Franklin	The Baltimore Sun	"for an account of brain surgery."
1980	Madeleine Blais	Miami Herald	"for Zepp's Last Stand."
1980	Bonnie M. Anderson	Miami Herald	"for 'Execution of My Father.'"
1980	John Sandford (Note: Under the pseudonym John Camp.)	St. Paul Pioneer Press	"for a series on Indians."
1980	Saul Pett	Associated Press	"On the snail darter."
1981	Teresa Carpenter	The Village Voice	"for her account of the death of actress-model Dorothy Stratten." (Note: Cooke was originally announced as the winner of this award, which was revoked after her story about an 8-year-old heroin addict was determined to be fabricated. Carpenter was then announced as winner)
1981	~~Janet Cooke~~	~~The Washington Post~~	
1981	Madeleine Blais	Miami Herald	
1981	Douglas Swanson	Dallas Times Herald	
1982	Saul Pett	Associated Press	"for an article profiling the federal bureaucracy."
1982	Buzz Bissinger	St. Paul Pioneer Press	"for his account of a near air crash and its aftermath."
1982	Erik Lacitis	The Seattle Times	"for his series on abortion."
1983	Nan C. Robertson	The New York Times	"for her memorable and medically detailed account of her struggle with toxic shock syndrome."
1983	Don Colburn	The Everett Herald	"for his documentation of the work of the nation's largest burn treatment center in Seattle, Washington."
1983	James Ricci	Detroit Free Press	"for his extraordinary account of an organ donation 'Kelly's Gift,' and the effects it had on the lives of four strangers."
1984	Peter Rinearson	The Seattle Times	"for 'Making It Fly,' his account of the new Boeing 757 jetliner."
1984	Charles Bowden	Tucson Citizen	"for his stories on illegal immigrants, sexual abuse of children and the deaths of two men."
1984	Jay William Hamburg	Birmingham Post-Herald	"for a series documenting the world of a young boxer and his manager."
1984	Nancy Tracy	Hartford Courant	"for her moving account of Meg Casey, a victim of premature aging."
1985	Alice Steinbach	The Baltimore Sun	"for her account of a blind boy's world, 'A Boy of Unusual Vision.'"
1985	Scott Kraft	Associated Press	"for his story about a family's search for the man who raped their daughter."
1985	Michele Lesie	The Morning Journal	"for her story of Jennifer Brandt, teen-age suicide."
1986	John Sandford	St. Paul Pioneer Press	"for his five-part series examining the life of an American farm family faced with the worst U.S. agricultural crisis since the Depression."
1986	David Lee Preston	The Philadelphia Inquirer	"for his account of how, by means of a trip through Germany and Eastern Europe, he managed to come to terms with his father's experiences in the Holocaust."
1986	Irene Virag	Newsday	"for her elegantly written and sensitive stories about the aspirations and accomplishments of ordinary people."
1987	Steve Twomey	The Philadelphia Inquirer	"for his illuminating profile of life aboard an aircraft carrier."
1987	Barry Bearak	Los Angeles Times	"for three gracefully written stories dealing respectively with a prison lawsuit, a family murder and an aging stand-up comic."
1987	Michael Connelly	Sun Sentinel	"for 'Into the Storm: The Story of Flight 191,' a sensitive reconstruction of an airplane crash."
1987	Robert McClure	Sun Sentinel	"for 'Into the Storm: The Story of Flight 191,' a sensitive reconstruction of an airplane crash."
1987	Malinda Reink	Sun Sentinel	"for 'Into the Storm: The Story of Flight 191,' a sensitive reconstruction of an airplane crash."
1987	Alex S. Jones	The New York Times	"for 'The Fall of the House of Bingham,' a skillful and sensitive report of a powerful newspaper family's bickering and how it led to the sale of a famed media empire."
1988	Jacqui Banaszynski	St. Paul Pioneer Press	"for her moving series about the life and death of an AIDS victim in a rural farm community."
1988	John Dorschner	Miami Herald	"for richly detailed stories about a violent neighborhood feud, ethnic tensions in the Miami Police Department and Holocaust survivors in South Florida."
1988	Lynne Duke	Miami Herald	"for her powerful story about life at a housing project overrun by the drug crack."
1989	David Zucchino	The Philadelphia Inquirer	"for his richly compelling series, 'Being Black in South Africa.'"
1989	Tad Bartimus	Associated Press	"for her story about the accidental drowning of three brothers and the effect it had on their small Missouri town."
1989	Bob Ehlert	The Minnesota Star Tribune	"for his stories about a local priest accused of sexual abuse."
1989	Loretta Tofani	The Philadelphia Inquirer	"for stories about a heroin addict's pregnancy and the birth of her addicted infant."
1990	Dave Curtin	The Gazette	"for a gripping account of a family's struggle to recover after its members were severely burned in an explosion that devastated their home."
1990	Mark Kriegel	New York Daily News	"for 'The People's Court,' a detailed account of the game of basketball as it is played on New York City playgrounds."
1990	Jay Reed	Milwaukee Journal Sentinel	"for a poignant series about his return to Vietnam."
1991	Sheryl James	St. Petersburg Times	"for a compelling series about a mother who abandoned her newborn child and how it affected her life and those of others."
1991	Tad Bartimus	Associated Press	"for her moving account of her father's death from lung cancer."
1991	Wil Haygood	The Boston Globe	"for three illuminating portraits of African-American life."
1992	Howell Raines	The New York Times	"for 'Grady's Gift,' an account of the author's childhood friendship with his family's black housekeeper and the lasting lessons of their relationship."
1992	Frank Bruni	Detroit Free Press	"for his profile of a child molester that challenged many assumptions about sexual abuse."
1992	Sheryl James	St. Petersburg Times	"for her gripping account of the effort to transplant the organs of a dead boy and turn the tragedy of his death into a gift of life for others."
1993	George Lardner	The Washington Post	"for his unflinching examination of his daughter's murder by a violent man who had slipped through the criminal justice system."
1993	Hank Stuever	The Albuquerque Tribune	"for his lively and vivid reporting of the celebration of a young couple's wedding."
1993	Judith Valente	The Wall Street Journal	"for her moving story about a family brought together by AIDS."
1994	Isabel Wilkerson	The New York Times	"for her profile of a fourth-grader from Chicago's South Side and for two stories reporting on the Midwestern flood of 1993."
1994	Mark Feeney	The Boston Globe	"for his provocative profile of former President Richard Nixon."
1994	Scott Higham	Miami Herald	"for their chilling portrait of seven suburban teenagers accused of murdering a friend."
1994	April Witt	Miami Herald	"for their chilling portrait of seven suburban teenagers accused of murdering a friend."
1995	Ron Suskind	The Wall Street Journal	"for his stories about inner-city honor students in Washington, D.C., and their determination to survive and prosper."
1995	David Finkel	The Washington Post	"for his story examining middle class flight from the District of Columbia, and for two profiles: of a family that watches television 17 hours a day, and of a Rush Limbaugh fan."
1995	Anne Hull	St. Petersburg Times	"for her account of a local businessman's secret life of drug addiction and consorting with prostitutes."
1995	Fen Montaigne	The Philadelphia Inquirer	"for stories about people who enjoy the outdoors, especially those with a passion for fishing."
1996	Rick Bragg	The New York Times	"for his elegantly written stories about contemporary America."
1996	Richard Meyer	Los Angeles Times	"for 'Buried Alive,' his chilling profile of a woman's desperate attempts to communicate after being left mute and paralyzed by strokes."
1996	Hank Stuever	The Albuquerque Tribune	"for his detailed and highly personal account of returning to his hometown of Oklahoma City after the bombing there."
1997	Lisa Pollak	The Baltimore Sun	"for her compelling portrait of a baseball umpire who endured the death of a son while knowing that another son suffers from the same deadly genetic disease."
1997	Jeffrey Fleishman	The Philadelphia Inquirer	"for his versatile storytelling, notably including an account of the flight of 15 Buddhist monks from Tibet through the Himalayas."
1997	Julia Prodis	Associated Press	"for her trio of vivid stories about three teenagers on a deadly journey, a photograph from the Oklahoma City bombing, and a vacuum cleaner that catches prairie dogs."
1998	Thomas French	St. Petersburg Times	"for his detailed and compassionate narrative portrait of a mother and two daughters slain on a Florida vacation, and the three-year investigation into their murders."
1998	Steve Giegerich	Asbury Park Press	"for his startling and original story about a bond that formed between four medical students and the cadaver they studied."
1998	J. R. Moehringer	Los Angeles Times	"for 'The Champ,' an extraordinary documentation of a heavyweight boxer's glory days and his fall."
1999	Angelo Henderson	The Wall Street Journal	"for his portrait of a druggist who is driven to violence by his encounters with armed robbery, illustrating the lasting effects of crime."
1999	Tom Hallman	The Oregonian	"for his unique profile of a man struggling to recover from a brain injury."
1999	Eric Wee	The Washington Post	"for his moving account of a Washington lawyer whose collection of postcards helps to preserve his memories of a fleetingly happy childhood."
2000	J. R. Moehringer	Los Angeles Times	"for his portrait of Gee's Bend, an isolated river community in Alabama where many descendants of slaves live, and how a proposed ferry to the mainland might change it."
2000	David Finkel	The Washington Post	"for his moving account of a woman forced to choose between staying with her family in a Macedonian refugee camp, or leaving to marry a man in France."
2000	Anne Hull	St. Petersburg Times	"for her quietly powerful stories of Mexican women who come to work in North Carolina crab shacks, in pursuit of a better life."
2001	Tom Hallman Jr.	The Oregonian	"for his poignant profile of a disfigured 14-year-old boy who elects to have life-threatening surgery in an effort to improve his appearance."
2001	Robin Gaby Fisher	The Star-Ledger	"for her inspirational stories that chronicled the care and recovery of two students critically burned in a dormitory fire at Seton Hall University."
2001	Richard Meyer	Los Angeles Times	"for his elegant, insightful portrait of a Tennessee family whose son shot three people at his high school."
2002	Barry Siegel	Los Angeles Times	"for his humane and haunting portrait of a man tried for negligence in the death of his son, and the judge who heard the case."
2002	Ellen Barry	The Boston Globe	"for her empathetic and illuminating portrait of teenaged Sudanese boys resettled in the U.S. who must engage with American culture."
2002	David Maraniss	The Washington Post	"for his moving and textured reconstruction of the tragic events of September 11th, described through the actions of several key participants."
2003	Sonia Nazario	Los Angeles Times	"for 'Enrique's Journey,' her touching, exhaustively reported story of a Honduran boy's perilous search for his mother who had migrated to the United States."
2003	Connie Schultz	The Plain Dealer	"for her moving story about a wrongfully convicted man who refused to succumb to anger or bitterness."
2003	David Stabler	The Oregonian	"for his sensitive, sometimes surprising chronicle of a teenage prodigy's struggle with a musical talent that proved to be both a gift and a problem."
2004	No award		
2004	Robert Hotz	Los Angeles Times	"for his lucid story on the efforts to unravel the mystery of why the Columbia space shuttle fell from the sky."
2004	Anne Hull	The Washington Post	"for their intimate exploration of the lives of wounded soldiers returning from Iraq."
2004	Tamara Jones	The Washington Post	"for their intimate exploration of the lives of wounded soldiers returning from Iraq."
2004	Patricia Wen	The Boston Globe	"for her story chronicling more aggressive efforts by states to terminate the rights of parents."
2005	Julia Keller	Chicago Tribune	"for her gripping, meticulously reconstructed account of a deadly 10-second tornado that ripped through Utica, Illinois."
2005	Robin Gaby Fisher	The Star-Ledger	"for her exhaustive look inside the lives of students at an alternative high school, shattering stereotypes and delineating memorable characters."
2005	Anne Hull	The Washington Post	"for her clear, sensitive, tirelessly reported stories on what it means to be young and gay in modern America."
2006	Jim Sheeler	Rocky Mountain News	"for his poignant story on a Marine major who helps the families of comrades killed in Iraq cope with their loss and honor their sacrifice."
2006	Dan Barry	The New York Times	"for his rich portfolio of pieces capturing slices of life in hurricane-battered New Orleans as well as his own New York City."
2006	Mary Schmich	Chicago Tribune	"for her intimate and compelling story about a federal judge whose husband and mother were murdered by an angry former plaintiff."
2007	Andrea Elliott	The New York Times	"for her intimate, richly textured portrait of an immigrant imam striving to find his way and serve his faithful in America."
2007	Christopher Goffard	St. Petersburg Times	"for his fresh and compelling stories about a young public defender and his daily challenges."
2007	Inara Verzemnieks	The Oregonian	"for her witty and perceptive portfolio of features on an array of everyday topics."
2008	Gene Weingarten	The Washington Post	"for his chronicling of a world-class violinist who, as an experiment, played beautiful music in a subway station filled with unheeding commuters."
2008	Thomas Curwen	Los Angeles Times	"for his vivid account of a grizzly bear attack and the recovery of the two victims."
2008	Kevin Vaughan	Rocky Mountain News	"for his sensitive retelling of a school bus and train collision at a rural crossing in 1961 that killed 20 children."
2009	Lane DeGregory	St. Petersburg Times	"for her moving, richly detailed story of a neglected little girl, found in a roach-infested room, unable to talk or feed herself, who was adopted by a new family committed to her nurturing."
2009	John Barry	St. Petersburg Times	"for his concise, captivating story about a rescued baby dolphin that needed a new tail and became a famous survivor, illuminating the mysterious connection between human beings and animals."
2009	Amy Ellis Nutt	The Star-Ledger	"for her poignant, deeply reported story of a chiropractor who suffered a severe stroke following brain surgery and became a wildly creative artist, in many ways estranged from his former self."
2009	Diane Suchetka	The Plain Dealer	"for her harrowing tale of a mechanic whose arms were reattached after being severed in an accident, a disciplined narrative that takes readers on the man's painful personal and physical journey to recover."
2010	Gene Weingarten	The Washington Post	"for his haunting story about parents, from varying walks of life, who accidentally kill their children by forgetting them in cars."
2010	Dan Barry	The New York Times	"for his portfolio of closely observed pieces that movingly capture how the Great Recession is changing lives and relationships in America."
2010	Sheri Fink	The New York Times Magazine	"for a story that chronicles the urgent life-and-death decisions made by one hospital's exhausted doctors when they were cut off by the floodwaters of Hurricane Katrina." (Note: Moved by the Pulitzer board to the Investigative Reporting category.)
2010	Sheri Fink	ProPublica	"for a story that chronicles the urgent life-and-death decisions made by one hospital's exhausted doctors when they were cut off by the floodwaters of Hurricane Katrina."
2011	Amy Ellis Nutt	The Star-Ledger	"for her deeply probing story of the mysterious sinking of a commercial fishing boat in the Atlantic Ocean that drowned six men."
2011	Tony Bartelme	The Post and Courier	"for his engaging account of a South Carolina neurosurgeon's quest to teach brain surgery in Tanzania, possibly providing a new model for health care in developing countries."
2011	Michael M. Phillips	The Wall Street Journal	"for his portfolio of deftly written stories that provide war-weary readers with fresh perspective on the conflict in Afghanistan."
2012	Eli Sanders	The Stranger	"for his haunting story of a woman who survived a brutal attack that took the life of her partner, using the woman's brave courtroom testimony and the details of the crime to construct a moving narrative."
2012	John Branch	The New York Times	"for his deeply reported story of Derek Boogaard, a professional hockey player valued for his brawling, whose tragic story shed light on a popular sport's disturbing embrace of potentially brain-damaging violence."
2012	Corinne Reilly	The Virginian-Pilot	"for her inspiring stories that bring the reader side-by-side with the medical professionals seeking to save the lives of gravely injured American soldiers at a combat hospital in Afghanistan."
2013	John Branch	The New York Times	"for his evocative narrative about skiers killed in an avalanche and the science that explains such disasters, a project enhanced by its deft integration of multimedia elements."
2013	Kelley Benham	Tampa Bay Times	"for her searing personal account of the survival of her premature baby, born barely viable at 1 pound, 4 ounces, and her exploration of the costs and ethics of extreme medical intervention."
2013	Eli Saslow	The Washington Post	"for his moving portrait of a struggling swimming pool salesman that illustrates the daily emotional toll of the nation's economic downturn."
2014	No award		
2014	Scott Farwell	The Dallas Morning News	"for his story about a young woman's struggle to live a normal life after years of ghastly child abuse, an examination of human resilience in the face of depravity."
2014	Christopher Goffard	Los Angeles Times	"for his account of an ex-police officer's nine-day killing spree in Southern California, notable for its pacing, character development and rich detail."
2014	Mark Johnson	Milwaukee Journal Sentinel	"for his meticulously told tale about a group of first-year medical students in their gross anatomy class and the relationships they develop with one another and the nameless corpse on the table, an account enhanced by multimedia elements."
2015	Diana Marcum	Los Angeles Times	"for her dispatches from California's Central Valley offering nuanced portraits of lives affected by the state's drought, bringing an original and empathic perspective to the story."
2015	Jennifer Gonnerman	The New Yorker	"for a taut, spare, devastating re-creation of the three-year imprisonment of a young man at Rikers Island, much of it spent in solitary confinement, after he was arrested for stealing a backpack."
2015	Sarah Schweitzer	The Boston Globe	"for her masterful narrative of one scientist's mission to save a rare whale, a beautiful story fortified by expansive reporting, a quiet lyricism and disciplined use of multimedia."
2016	Kathryn Schulz	The New Yorker	"for an elegant scientific narrative of the rupturing of the Cascadia fault line, a masterwork of environmental reporting and writing."
2016	N. R. Kleinfield	The New York Times	"for the layered and riveting account of the last days of a Queens man, part detective story, part eulogy and part exploration of a city's bureaucracy of death."
2016	Eli Saslow	The Washington Post	"for three humane and topical feature stories exploring lives affected by a natural disaster, gun violence and a frayed social safety net."
2017	C. J. Chivers	The New York Times	"for showing, through an artful accumulation of fact and detail, that a Marine's postwar descent into violence reflected neither the actions of a simple criminal nor a stereotypical case of PTSD."
2017	Devlin Barrett	The Wall Street Journal	"for 'The Last Diplomat,' a multilayered thriller that took readers inside the rarely seen intersection of diplomacy and national security, telling the story of one woman's professional ruin after years of service to her country."
2017	Adam Entous	The Wall Street Journal	"for 'The Last Diplomat,' a multilayered thriller that took readers inside the rarely seen intersection of diplomacy and national security, telling the story of one woman's professional ruin after years of service to her country."
2017	Eli Saslow	The Washington Post	"for a nuanced and empathetic portrait of America created through human stories that chronicled the fissures, resentments, failures and disappointments that marked a divided and restive body politic."
2018	Rachel Kaadzi Ghansah	GQ	"for an unforgettable portrait of murderer Dylann Roof, using a unique and powerful mix of reportage, first-person reflection and analysis of the historical and cultural forces behind his killing of nine people inside Emanuel AME Church in Charleston, South Carolina."
2018	John Woodrow Cox	The Washington Post	"for a gripping portfolio of stories rendered with keen observation and graceful yet simple writing that presents the horror of gun violence from an entirely new perspective: through the eyes of children."
2018	Norimitsu Onishi	The New York Times	"for a literary masterwork of observation that painted a portrait of the last days of Japan's isolated elders, who are housed in iconic apartment complexes where they prepare for deaths they hope will be noticed and tended to by their quiet neighbors."
2019	Hannah Dreier	ProPublica	"for a series of powerful, intimate narratives that followed Salvadoran immigrants on New York's Long Island whose lives were shattered by a botched federal crackdown on the international criminal gang MS-13."
2019	Jennifer Berry Hawes	The Post and Courier	"for a deeply moving examination of racial injustice in South Carolina that led to the execution of a 14-year-old black boy wrongfully convicted of killing two white girls, and that ultimately exonerated him seven decades after his death."
2019	Deanna Pan	The Post and Courier	"for a deeply moving examination of racial injustice in South Carolina that led to the execution of a 14-year-old black boy wrongfully convicted of killing two white girls, and that ultimately exonerated him seven decades after his death."
2019	Elizabeth Bruenig	The Washington Post	"for eloquent reflections on the exile of a teen sexual assault victim in the author's Texas hometown, delving with moral authority into why the crime remained unpunished."
2020	Ben Taub	The New Yorker	"for a devastating account of a man who was kidnapped, tortured and deprived of his liberty for more than a decade at the Guantanamo Bay detention facility, blending on-the-ground reporting and lyrical prose to offer a nuanced perspective on America's wider war on terror."
2020	Ellen Barry	The New York Times	"for a beautifully written tale of an Indian 'prince' whose story concealed deeper truths rooted in the violence and trauma of the Partition of India."
2020	Chloé Cooper Jones	The Verge	"for her gripping portrait of Ramsey Orta, who recorded the NYPD killing of Eric Garner, using restrained yet powerful language and courageous reporting to show the police retribution endured by a forgotten figure in a story that horrified the nation."
2020	Nestor Ramos	The Boston Globe	"for a sweeping yet intimate story about how climate change is drastically reshaping Cape Cod, locally illustrating the urgent global crisis."
2021	Nadja Drost	The California Sunday Magazine	"for a brave and gripping account of global migration that documents a group's journey on foot through the Darién Gap, one of the most dangerous migrant routes in the world."
2021	Mitchell S. Jackson	Runner's World	"for a deeply affecting account of the killing of Ahmaud Arbery that combined vivid writing, thorough reporting and personal experience to shed light on systemic racism in America."
2021	Greg Jaffe	The Washington Post	"for deeply reported stories that powerfully depict the suffering and dislocation endured by Americans who lost their jobs after the sudden collapse of South Florida's tourist economy in the pandemic."
2022	Jennifer Senior	The Atlantic	"for an unflinching portrait of a family's reckoning with loss in the 20 years since 9/11, masterfully braiding the author's personal connection to the story with sensitive reporting that reveals the long reach of grief."
2022	Ken Armstrong	ProPublica	"for their enterprising and empathetic account of 11 Black children in Tennessee who were arrested for a crime that doesn't exist."
2022	Meribah Knight	WPLN	"for their enterprising and empathetic account of 11 Black children in Tennessee who were arrested for a crime that doesn't exist."
2022	Anand Gopal	The New Yorker	"for his account, published shortly after the U.S. announced its departure from Afghanistan, of Afghan women who have been forgotten in the dominant narrative about the war."
2023	Eli Saslow	The Washington Post	"for evocative individual narratives about people struggling with the pandemic, homelessness, addiction and inequality that collectively form a sharply-observed portrait of contemporary America."
2023	Elizabeth Bruenig	The Atlantic	"for exposing the tortuous last hours of inmates awaiting execution on Alabama's death row and the efforts by the state to conceal the suffering, which led to a temporary moratorium on executions."
2023	Janelle Nanos	The Boston Globe	"for her decade-long investigation of a woman's quest to confirm her childhood sexual abuse that finally uncovered evidence that seemed to verify the horrors."
2024	Katie Engelhart	The New York Times	"for her fair-minded portrait of a family's legal and emotional struggles during a matriarch's progressive dementia that sensitively probes the mystery of a person's essential self."
2024	Keri Blakinger	The Marshall Project	"for her insightful, humane portrait, reported with great difficulty, of men on death row in Texas who play clandestine games of Dungeons and Dragons, countering their extreme isolation with elaborate fantasy."
2024	Keri Blakinger	The New York Times Magazine	"for her insightful, humane portrait, reported with great difficulty, of men on death row in Texas who play clandestine games of Dungeons and Dragons, countering their extreme isolation with elaborate fantasy."
2024	Jennifer Senior	The Atlantic	"for her exquisitely rendered account of her disabled aunt, who was institutionalized as a small child, and the lasting effects on her family, told in the context of present-day care and intervention that make different outcomes possible."
2025	Mark Warren	Esquire	"for a sensitive portrait of a Baptist pastor and small town mayor who died by suicide after his secret digital life was exposed by a right-wing news site."
2025	Anand Gopal	The New Yorker	"for a deeply reported narrative of a woman's life before and after she is imprisoned at an isolated detention camp in Eastern Syria, illustrating how love and family intersect with larger geopolitical concerns."
2025	Joe Sexton	The Marshall Project	"for his exclusive inside account of a legal team's efforts to spare the Parkland high school shooter from the death penalty, a saga of moral complexity, constitutional law and shattering trauma for those involved."
2026	Aaron Parsley	Texas Monthly	"for his extraordinary personal account of survival and loss written days after the historic Central Texas floods that tore the writer's house out from under him and his family, taking the life of his nephew."
2026	Rachel Aviv	The New Yorker	"for an extraordinary exploration of how some patients diagnosed with schizophrenia actually have autoimmune conditions–and what happens after they're treated."
2026	Emily Baumgaertner Nunn	The New York Times	"for her deeply and sensitively reported narrative that chronicles the explosion of child sex trafficking in Los Angeles."
