= 2015 Pulitzer Prize =

Awards for journalism and related fields

The 2015 Pulitzer Prizes were awarded by the Pulitzer Prize Board for work during the 2014 calendar year. Prize winners and nominated finalists were announced on April 20, 2015.

== Prizes ==
=== Journalism ===
Public Service
The Post and Courier "for 'Till Death Do Us Part,' a riveting series that probed why South Carolina is among the deadliest states in the union for women and put the issue of what to do about it on the state's agenda."
The Boston Globe "for its stories, videos, photos and graphics exposing a poorly regulated, profit-driven housing system that subjected thousands of college students in Boston to unsafe, and even deadly, conditions."
The Wall Street Journal "for 'Deadly Medicine,' a stellar reporting project that documented the significant cancer risk to women of a common surgery and prompted a change in the prescribed medical treatment."

Breaking News Reporting
The Seattle Times staff "for its digital account of a landslide that killed 43 people and the impressive follow-up reporting that explored whether the calamity could have been avoided."
The Buffalo News staff "for a superbly reported and written account of a lake-effect snowstorm, using human detail to illuminate the story and multimedia elements to help readers through the storm."
Los Angeles Times staff "for a quick but thoughtful response to a shooting spree, beginning with minute-by-minute digital storytelling and evolving into print coverage that delved into the impact of the tragedy."

Investigative Reporting
Eric Lipton of The New York Times "for reporting that showed how the influence of lobbyists can sway congressional leaders and state attorneys general, slanting justice toward the wealthy and connected."
The Wall Street Journal staff "for 'Medicare Unmasked,' a pioneering project that gave Americans unprecedented access to previously confidential data on the motivations and practices of their health care providers." The team included John Carreyrou, Chris Stewart, Rob Barry, Tom McGinty, Martin Burch, Jon Keegan and Stuart Thompson.
David Jackson, Gary Marx and Duaa Eldeib of the Chicago Tribune "for their exposé of the perils faced by abused children placed in Illinois's residential treatment centers."

Explanatory Reporting
Zachary R. Mider of Bloomberg News "for a painstaking, clear and entertaining explanation of how so many U.S. corporations dodge taxes and why lawmakers and regulators have a hard time stopping them."
John Ingold, Joe Amon and Lindsay Pierce of The Denver Post "for an intimate and troubling portrayal of how Colorado's relaxed marijuana laws have drawn hundreds of parents to the state to seek miracle cures for desperately ill children."
Joan Biskupic, Janet Roberts and John Shiffman of Reuters "for using data analysis to reveal how an elite cadre of lawyers enjoy extraordinary access to the U.S. Supreme Court, raising doubts about the ideal of equal justice."

Local Reporting
Rob Kuznia, Rebecca Kimitch and Frank Suraci of the Daily Breeze "for their inquiry into widespread corruption in a small, cash-strapped school district, including impressive use of the paper's website."
Joe Mahr, Joseph Ryan and Matthew Walberg of the Chicago Tribune "for their probe into government corruption in a Chicago suburb, using public records, human stories and shoe-leather reporting to lay out the consequences."
Ziva Branstetter and Cary Aspinwall of the Tulsa World "for courageous reporting on the execution process in Oklahoma after a botched execution – reporting that began a national discussion."

National Reporting
Carol D. Leonnig of The Washington Post "for her smart, persistent coverage of the Secret Service, its security lapses and the ways in which the agency neglected its vital task: the protection of the President of the United States."
Marisa Taylor, Jonathan Landay and Ali Watkins of McClatchy Newspapers "for timely coverage of the Senate Intelligence Committee's report on CIA torture, demonstrating initiative and perseverance in overcoming government efforts to hide the details."
Walt Bogdanich and Mike McIntire of The New York Times "for stories exposing preferential police treatment for Florida State University football players who are accused of sexual assault and other criminal offenses."

International Reporting
The New York Times staff "for courageous front-line reporting and vivid human stories on Ebola in Africa, engaging the public with the scope and details of the outbreak while holding authorities accountable." This coverage was coordinated by Greg Winter.
Richard Marosi and Don Bartletti of the Los Angeles Times "for reporting on the squalid conditions and brutal practices inside the multibillion dollar industry that supplies vegetables from Mexican fields to American supermarkets."
Ned Parker and a team from Reuters "for intrepid reports of the disintegration of Iraq and the rise of ISIS, linking the developing catastrophe to a legacy of sectarianism, corruption and violence seeded by the U.S. invasion."

Feature Writing
Diana Marcum of the Los Angeles Times "for her dispatches from California's Central Valley offering nuanced portraits of lives affected by the state's drought, bringing an original and empathic perspective to the story."
Sarah Schweitzer of The Boston Globe "for her masterful narrative of one scientist's mission to save a rare whale, a beautiful story fortified by expansive reporting, a quiet lyricism and disciplined use of multimedia."
Jennifer Gonnerman of The New Yorker "for a taut, spare, devastating re-creation of the three-year imprisonment of a young man at Rikers Island, much of it spent in solitary confinement, after he was arrested for stealing a backpack."

Commentary
Lisa Falkenberg of the Houston Chronicle "for vividly-written, groundbreaking columns about grand jury abuses that led to a wrongful conviction and other egregious problems in the legal and immigration systems."
David Carr of The New York Times "for columns on the media whose subjects range from threats to cable television's profit-making power to ISIS's use of modern media to menace its enemies."
Matthew Kaminski of The Wall Street Journal "for columns from Ukraine, sometimes reported near heavy fighting, deepening readers’ insights into the causes behind the conflict with Russia and the nature and motives of the people involved."

Criticism
Mary McNamara of the Los Angeles Times "for savvy criticism that uses shrewdness, humor and an insider's view to show how both subtle and seismic shifts in the cultural landscape affect television."
Manohla Dargis of The New York Times "for film criticism that rises from a sweeping breadth of knowledge – social, cultural, cinematic – while always keeping the viewer front and center."
Stephanie Zacharek of The Village Voice "for film criticism that combines the pleasure of intellectual exuberance, the perspective of experience and the transporting power of good writing."

Editorial Writing
Kathleen Kingsbury of The Boston Globe "for taking readers on a tour of restaurant workers’ bank accounts to expose the real price of inexpensive menu items and the human costs of income inequality."
Tony Messenger and Kevin Horrigan of the St. Louis Post-Dispatch "for editorials that brought insight and context to the national tragedy of Ferguson, MO, without losing sight of the community's needs."
Jill Burcum of the Star Tribune, Minneapolis, "for well-written and well-reported editorials that documented a national shame by taking readers inside dilapidated government schools for Native Americans."

Editorial Cartooning
Adam Zyglis of The Buffalo News "who used strong images to connect with readers while conveying layers of meaning in a few words."
Kevin Kallaugher of The Baltimore Sun "for simple, punchy cartoons with a classic feel lampooning the hypocrisy of not just his subjects but also his readers."
Dan Perkins, drawing as Tom Tomorrow, of Daily Kos "for cartoons that create an alternate universe -- an America frozen in time whose chorus of conventional wisdom is at odds with current reality."

Breaking News Photography
St. Louis Post-Dispatch photography staff "for powerful images of the despair and anger in Ferguson, MO, stunning photojournalism that served the community while informing the country."
Mauricio Lima, Sergey Ponomarev and Uriel Sinai of The New York Times "for photographs that portrayed the conflict in Ukraine in an intimate way, showing how the battle for power crushed the lives of people."
Tyler Hicks, Sergey Ponomarev and Wissam Nassar of The New York Times "for capturing key moments in the human struggle in Gaza and providing a fresh take on a long, bloody conflict."

Feature Photography
Daniel Berehulak, freelance photographer, The New York Times "for his gripping, courageous photographs of the Ebola epidemic in West Africa."
Bülent Kiliç of Agence France-Presse in Washington, D.C., "for his compelling photographs of Kurds fleeing ISIS attacks in small Kurdish towns on the Syrian-Turkish border."
Bob Owen, Jerry Lara and Lisa Krantz of the San Antonio Express-News "for chilling photographs that document the hard road Central American migrants must follow to seek refuge in the United States."

=== Letters, Drama, and Music ===
Fiction
All the Light We Cannot See by Anthony Doerr, "an imaginative and intricate novel inspired by the horrors of World War II and written in short, elegant chapters that explore human nature and the contradictory power of technology."
Let Me Be Frank with You by Richard Ford, "an unflinching series of narratives, set in the aftermath of Hurricane Sandy, insightfully portraying a society in decline."
The Moor's Account by Laila Lalami, "a creative narrative of the ill-fated 16th Century Spanish expedition to Florida, compassionately imagined out of the gaps and silences of history."
Lovely, Dark, Deep by Joyce Carol Oates, "a rich collection of stories told from many rungs of the social ladder and distinguished by their intelligence, language and technique."

Drama
Between Riverside and Crazy by Stephen Adly Guirgis, "a nuanced, beautifully written play about a retired police officer faced with eviction that uses dark comedy to confront questions of life and death."
Marjorie Prime by Jordan Harrison, "a sly and surprising work about technology and artificial intelligence told through images and ideas that resonate."
Father Comes Home from the Wars (Parts 1, 2, 3) by Suzan-Lori Parks, "a distinctive and lyrical epic about a slave during the Civil War that deftly takes on questions of identity, power and freedom with a blend of humor and dignity."

History
Encounters at the Heart of the World: A History of the Mandan People by Elizabeth A. Fenn "an engrossing, original narrative showing the Mandans, a Native American tribe in the Dakotas, as a people with a history."
Empire of Cotton: A Global History by Sven Beckert, "a work of staggering scholarship arguing that slavery was crucial to the dynamism of the industrial revolution."
An Empire on the Edge: How Britain Came to Fight America by Nick Bunker, "a bifocal perspective on the countdown to the American Revolution, placing the war within a broader crisis of globalization."

Biography or Autobiography
The Pope and Mussolini: The Secret History of Pius XI and the Rise of Fascism in Europe by David I. Kertzer, "an engrossing dual biography that uses recently opened Vatican archives to shed light on two men who exercised nearly absolute power over their realms."
Louis Armstrong: Master of Modernism by Thomas Brothers, "the masterfully researched second volume of a life of the musical pioneer, effectively showing him in the many milieus where he lived and worked in the 1920s and 1930s."
Stalin: Volume I: Paradoxes of Power, 1878-1928 by Stephen Kotkin, "a superbly researched tour de force of pre- and post-revolutionary Russian history told through the life of Joseph Stalin."

Poetry
Digest by Gregory Pardlo, "clear-voiced poems that bring readers the news from 21st Century America, rich with thought, ideas and histories public and private."
Reel to Reel by Alan Shapiro, "finely crafted poems with a composure that cannot conceal the troubled terrain they traverse."
Compass Rose by Arthur Sze, "a collection in which the poet uses capacious intelligence and lyrical power to offer a dazzling picture of our inter-connected world."

General Nonfiction
The Sixth Extinction: An Unnatural History by Elizabeth Kolbert, "an exploration of nature that forces readers to consider the threat posed by human behavior to a world of astonishing diversity."
No Good Men Among the Living by Anand Gopal, "a remarkable work of nonfiction storytelling that exposes the cascade of blunders that doomed America's misbegotten intervention in Afghanistan."
Age of Ambition: Chasing Fortune, Truth, and Faith in the New China by Evan Osnos, "the story of a vast country and society in the grip of transformation, calmly surveyed, smartly reported and portrayed with exacting strokes."

Pulitzer Prize for Music
Anthracite Fields by Julia Wolfe premiered in Philadelphia on April 26, 2014 by the Bang on a Can All-Stars and the Mendelssohn Club Chorus, "a powerful oratorio for chorus and sextet evoking Pennsylvania coal-mining life around the turn of the 20th Century."
Xiaoxiang by Lei Liang, premiered in Boston on March 28, 2014 by the Boston Modern Orchestra Project, "a concerto for alto saxophone and orchestra, inspired by a widow's wail and blending the curious sensations of grief and exhilaration."
The Aristos by John Zorn, premiered in New York City on December 21, 2014, "a parade of stylistically diverse sounds for violin, cello and piano that create a vivid demonstration of the brain in fluid, unpredictable action."
