= When a Witness Recants =

2026 documentary film by Dawn Porter

- Release poster
- Directed by: Dawn Porter
- Based on: "When a Witness Recants" by Jennifer Gonnerman
- Produced by: Dawn Porter; Miriam Weintraub; Jennifer Oko
- Cinematography: Bryan Gentry
- Edited by: Jessica Congdon
- Music by: Osei Essed
- Production companies: HBO Documentary Films; Maceo-Lyn; Trilogy Films; Sony Pictures Television—Nonfiction
- Distributed by: HBO Documentary Films
- Release dates: January 27, 2026 (Sundance); November 17, 2026 (United States)
- Running time: 112 minutes
- Country: United States
- Language: English

When a Witness Recants is a 2026 American documentary film directed and produced by Dawn Porter, and executive produced by author Ta-Nehisi Coates. Based on a 2021 New Yorker article by Jennifer Gonnerman, the film examines the wrongful convictions of Andrew Stewart, Ransom Watkins, and Alfred Chestnut—known as the Harlem Park Three—who were convicted as teenagers and spent 36 years in prison for the 1983 murder of 14-year-old DeWitt Duckett at Harlem Park Junior High in Baltimore, a crime they did not commit.

The film premiered in the Premieres section of the 2026 Sundance Film Festival on January 27, 2026, and is distributed by HBO Documentary Films. It received positive reviews from critics.

== Premise ==
In November 1983, 14-year-old DeWitt Duckett was shot and killed inside Harlem Park Junior High, a Baltimore public school, during a robbery for his jacket. Three 16-year-old graduates of the school—Alfred Chestnut, Andrew Stewart, and Ransom Watkins—who happened to have visited that day were convicted of the murder and sentenced to life in prison. The convictions rested on coerced testimony from child witnesses Ron Bishop and Edward Capers, who were threatened with violence and imprisonment by lead investigator Donald Kincaid if they did not corroborate the police's theory. Porter has said that the three men's combined sentences represent the longest wrongful conviction in American history.

In June 2019, Baltimore's Conviction Integrity Unit received long-suppressed exculpatory evidence in the case after Chestnut's years-long pursuit of sealed police reports. Bishop's formal recantation of his testimony helped fast-track the overturning of the convictions, and the three men were released in time for Thanksgiving 2019, having spent 36 years behind bars. Former Baltimore State's Attorney Marilyn Mosby was instrumental in securing the exonerations.

The film follows Coates, who grew up in West Baltimore and remembered the original case from childhood, as he revisits its impact alongside Porter. It interweaves new interviews with the Harlem Park Three, deposition videos from their 2022 federal lawsuit against the Baltimore Police Department (which resulted in a landmark settlement), archival news footage, and expressive black-and-white graphic animations by comic book artist Dawud Anyabwile that depict the events from a child's perspective. The film examines not only the wrongful convictions themselves but the psychological toll of decades of incarceration, the disorientation of reentry, and the experiences of the child witnesses whose fabricated testimony sealed the men's fate.

== Production ==
The film was produced by Trilogy Films in association with HBO Documentary Films, Maceo-Lyn, and Sony Pictures Television—Nonfiction. Porter and Coates were both drawn to the project after reading Gonnerman's 2021 New Yorker article.

Because the men were incarcerated at age 16 and spent over three decades in prison, little photographic or video documentation of their lives existed. Porter turned to Anyabwile's graphic novel–style illustrations as a creative solution, which she has said also helped make the film more accessible to younger audiences. The film moves beyond the scope of Gonnerman's original article to incorporate excerpts from 2022 depositions taken as part of the men's federal lawsuit against the Baltimore Police Department. Neither lead investigator Donald Kincaid nor trial judge Robert Bell agreed to be interviewed for the film, and prosecutor Jonathan Shoup died in 2016.

== Release ==
When a Witness Recants premiered at the 2026 Sundance Film Festival on January 27, 2026, at the Library Center Theatre in Park City, Utah, with additional screenings through February 1. Stewart, Watkins, and Chestnut attended the premiere and received a standing ovation. The film was acquired for distribution by HBO Documentary Films. It will be released on HBO Max on November 17.

== Reception ==
On the review aggregator website Rotten Tomatoes, 100% of 17 critics' reviews are positive, with an average rating of 7.6/10. Metacritic, which uses a weighted average, assigns the film a score of 82 out of 100, based on 6 critics, indicating "generally favorable" reviews.

The film received strongly positive reviews from critics at Sundance. Sheri Linden of The Hollywood Reporter called it "wrenching, illuminating and full of heart," praising Porter's measured approach to the case. Siddhant Adlakha of Variety described it as "a powerful documentary" and "a thorough and affecting work of nonfiction cinema."
