= Bonnie Anderson =

Bonnie Anderson may refer to:

- Bonnie Anderson (Episcopalian), former president of the House of Deputies in the Episcopal Church in the United States
- Bonnie Anderson (singer) (born 1994), Australian singer/songwriter
- Bonnie M. Anderson (born 1955), American news journalist
- Bonnie Anderson (Toy Story), a character in the film Toy Story 3
