= Hank Stuever =

American journalist

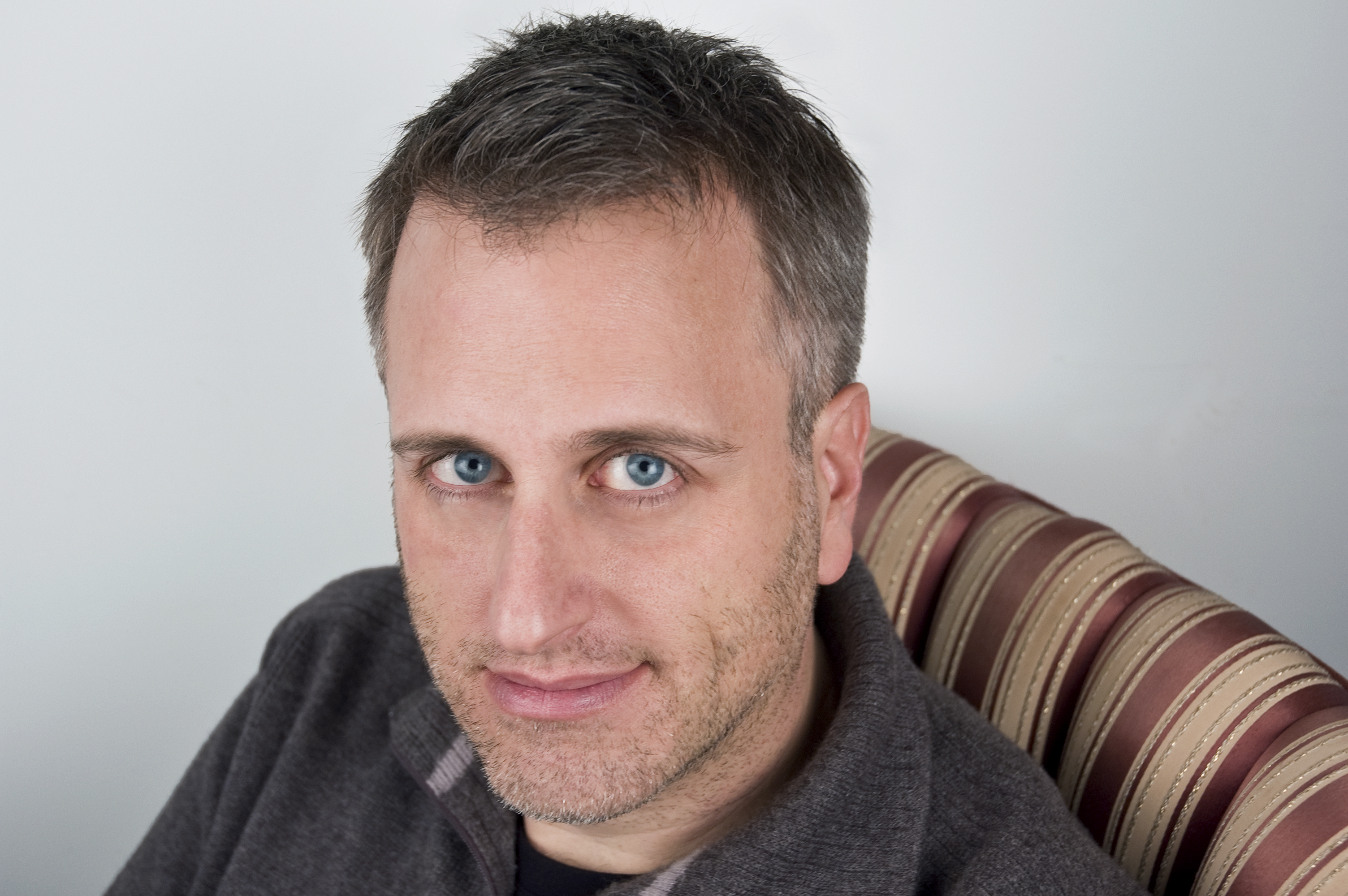
- Born: 1968 (age 57–58); Oklahoma City, Oklahoma, U.S.
- Education: Loyola University New Orleans (BA)
- Occupation: Journalist
- Employer: The Washington Post

Hank Stuever (born 1968) is an American journalist who served as an editor and writer for 26 years at The Washington Post.

== Early life and education ==
Stuever was born and raised in Oklahoma City, where he attended Bishop McGuinness Catholic High School. Stuever earned a Bachelor of Arts degree from Loyola University New Orleans in 1990.

== Career ==
In 2009, Stuever became the paper's TV critic. He was a finalist for the Pulitzer Prize for Feature Writing in 1993 and 1996. His book of articles and essays, Off Ramp: Adventures and Heartache in the American Elsewhere, was published in 2004. Entertainment Weekly called Off Ramp "Razor sharp...a master class in top-notch journalism."

In 2009, Stuever released his second book, Tinsel: A Search for America's Christmas Present. It looks at the lives of three families in Frisco, Texas, during three consecutive Christmas seasons and the holiday's effects on modern culture and the consumer economy.

Earlier in his career, Stuever was a reporter for The Albuquerque Tribune and the Austin American-Statesman.

== Personal life ==
Stuever lives in Washington, D.C.
