= Nan C. Robertson =

American journalist and educator (1926–2009)

- Born: July 11, 1926; Chicago, Illinois, U.S.
- Died: October 13, 2009 (aged 83); Rockville, Maryland, U.S.
- Occupations: Journalist, instructor in journalism
- Notable credit(s): The New York Times; The Girls in the Balcony: Women, Men, and The New York Times (book)
- Spouse(s): Allyn Baum (divorce); Stanley Levey (d. 1971); William Warfield Ross (d. 2006)
- Children: 5 stepchildren

Nan C. Robertson (July 11, 1926 – October 13, 2009) was an American journalist, author and instructor in journalism. Her awards included a Pulitzer Prize for Feature Writing.

== Five decades in journalism ==
Born in Chicago, Illinois, Robertson attended Northwestern University, where she was a member of Alpha Phi sorority until she graduated in 1948. She traveled to Europe and was a reporter for Stars and Stripes in Germany (1948–49) and a fashion publicist in Paris (1950). From 1951 to 1953, she was a correspondent in Germany for the Milwaukee Journal and a feature writer and columnist — based in Paris, Berlin, Frankfurt and London — for the New York Herald Tribune from 1952 to 1953. Robertson also reported for the London American Daily from 1953 to 1954.

Robertson joined the staff of The New York Times in 1955, beginning as a general assignment reporter for the city desk and women's news.

From 1963 to 1972, Robertson was a Washington correspondent, focusing on the White House, Congress, presidential campaigns and voting and campus political trends across the United States. From 1972 to 1975, she was based in Paris, covering France, neighboring countries and the Turkish invasion of Cyprus. From 1975 to 1982, Robertson reported for the Living and Style sections.

In 1983, Robertson won the Pulitzer Prize for Feature Writing for Toxic Shock, her medically detailed account of her struggle with toxic shock syndrome, a cover story for The New York Times Magazine that at that time became the most widely syndicated article in Times history.

She formally retired from the Times in 1988 (serving her last five years as a reporter on the cultural news desk), but continued to write for the paper until 1996.

In 1994, Robertson became the first Eugene L. Roberts Visiting Professor of Journalism at the University of Maryland.

She died in Rockville, Maryland, at the age of 83.

== Other awards ==
In addition to her Pulitzer Prize, Robertson is a recipient of the following:

- 1962 - Newswomen's Club of New York - Feature Writing Award
- 1980 - Newswomen's Club of New York - Best Feature Front Page Award
- 1981 and 1983 - Fellowship at the MacDowell Colony
- 1982 - Newswomen's Club of New York - Special Award for Excellence for "Toxic Shock"
- 1983 - Newspaper Guild of New York - Page One Award
- 1983 - Woodrow Wilson National Fellowship
- 1991 - Northwestern University Alumnae Award
- 1992 - Northwestern University - honorary degree, Doctor of Humane Letters
- 1993 - International Women's Media Foundation - Lifetime Achievement Award
- 2009 - Washington Press Club - Lifetime Achievement Award
- 2009 - Foremother Award from the National Center for Health Research

== Publications ==
External videos
- Booknotes interview with Robertson on The Girls in The Balcony: Women, Men, and The New York Times, March 29, 1992, C-SPAN

- Getting Better: Inside Alcoholics Anonymous. New York: William Morrow. 1988. ISBN 0-688-06869-3.
- The Girls in the Balcony: Women, Men, and The New York Times. New York: Random House. 1992. ISBN 0-394-58452-X.
