= Days of Love and Rage =

2026 non-fiction book by Anand Gopal

Days of Love and Rage: A Story of Ordinary People Forging a Revolution
- Author: Anand Gopal
- Language: English
- Subject: Syrian revolution
- Genre: Narrative nonfiction
- Publisher: Simon & Schuster
- Publication date: 2026
- Publication place: United States
- Media type: Print

Days of Love and Rage: A Story of Ordinary People Forging a Revolution is a 2026 non-fiction book by the journalist Anand Gopal. It is his second book, following No Good Men Among the Living (2014), which was a finalist for the Pulitzer Prize and the National Book Award. The book covers six decades of Syrian history, from the rise of the Ba'ath Party to the fall of Bashar al-Assad in December 2024, with the Syrian revolution of 2011 in the city of Manbij as its central narrative. It was longlisted for the 2026 Baillie Gifford Prize for non-fiction.

== Summary ==
Based on more than 2,000 interviews conducted over eight years, the book follows Syrians from Manbij, in northern Syria, who took part in an eighteen-month period of self-government after overthrowing local Ba'athist control in 2012. Gopal tells the story through several central figures, including two friends whose friendship is broken by political division and a woman who challenges male authority within her community. The book also covers the Islamic State's later takeover of the area and the eventual fall of the Assad government.

== Reception ==
The New York Times Book Review called it a masterpiece and praised its account of ordinary Syrians who fought against authoritarian rule. Kirkus Reviews described it as an authoritative work of journalism, noting its street-level reporting inside homes and businesses in Manbij during the uprising. Writing for The New Yorker, Patrick Radden Keefe called it an astonishing book about the limits of fear and the search for meaning in personal sacrifice. The book was longlisted for the 2026 Baillie Gifford Prize for non-fiction.
