= Jon Sarkin =

American painter (1953-2024)

- Born: April 27, 1953; Newark, New Jersey
- Died: July 19, 2024 (aged 71); Gloucester, Massachusetts
- Education: Self-taught
- Known for: Art
- Movement: Outsider Art, Neo-expressionism

Jon Sarkin (April 27, 1953 – July 19, 2024) was a self-taught contemporary American artist.

He created elaborate drawings and paintings filled with words and images, among other artistic endeavors. Sarkin had been painting for over 20 years. His work has been featured in The New Yorker, The New York Times, ABC Primetime, This American Life, GQ, ARTnews, and galleries in New York City, Los Angeles, and around the world. He lived and worked in Cape Ann, Massachusetts.

== Early life ==
Born in 1953 in Newark, New Jersey, and raised in Hillside, New Jersey, Jon Sarkin was the middle child of Stanley Sarkin and Elaine Sarkin Zheutlin. He graduated in 1971 from the Pingry School in Elizabeth, New Jersey (since moved to Martinsville, New Jersey). His father, a dentist in Elizabeth, New Jersey, died of a heart attack in 1972 at age 49.

In 1975, he graduated with a BA degree in Biology from the University of Pennsylvania, and received his MS degree in Environmental Science from Rutgers University in 1977. He received his DC (Doctor of Chiropractic) from Palmer College of Chiropractic in 1980. His older brother, Richard, was a pediatrician, while his younger sister, Jane, is features editor for Vanity Fair. In 1982, Sarkin opened a chiropractic office in South Hamilton, Massachusetts. In 1986 he married Kim Richardson.

== Transition to artist ==
In 1988 at the age of 35, Sarkin suddenly developed tinnitus, a ringing in the ears caused by a blood vessel in his head pushing against an acoustic nerve, as well as hyperacusis, an over-sensitivity to certain frequency ranges of sound. In 1989, to alleviate the condition, he underwent surgery after which he suffered a massive hemorrhagic stroke. Sarkin awoke from the surgery deaf in one ear, his vision splintered, and his balance permanently skewed. Neurologists told him his brain had been permanently changed through the surgery, with parts sliced and removed to alleviate the condition. The neurons that were left had to make new connections and find new meaning.

As a result, it became increasingly difficult to maintain the semblance of his former life. Sarkin became obsessed with drawing, but different from the kinds of focused sketches he had made before the stroke. Instead of the visual jokes and puns he drew before, his new works were akin to distorted cartoon faces with symbols that sometimes overlapped the features, much like Jean Giraud's Moebius strips. Influenced by comics and popular culture, the images kept coming, spilling out of some dark unknown place in his brain.

== Professional art career ==
Sarkin has been featured in Vanity Fair, ABC Medical Mysteries Discovery Channel documentary “Tormented by Genius,” GQ, ARTnews, and the American Visionary Art Museum. In addition, he has been featured in Art New England, 2011. Sarkin's artwork typically sells in the $10,000 USD range or more.

Sarkin created the album art for the Guster album, Easy Wonderful, and he also created art for (and appears in) their music video/single "Do You Love Me?" Tom Cruise's production company optioned his life story for a movie, but the project was put on hold and has yet to be made. In 2011, Pulitzer Prize winning author Amy Ellis Nutt wrote a book about him titled Shadows Bright as Glass, for which she and Jon were interviewed by Terry Gross of NPR's Fresh Air.

On December 6, 2021, Sarkin signed an exclusive representation deal with the Henry Boxer Gallery, which has specialized in outsider and visionary art since the 1970s.

== Death ==
Sarkin was found dead in his studio in the afternoon of July 19, 2024 at the age of 71 years, pen in hand.
