= George Lardner =

American journalist (1934–2019)

- Born: George Edmund Lardner Jr. August 10, 1934; New York City, U.S.
- Died: September 21, 2019 (aged 85); Aldie, Virginia, U.S.
- Education: Marquette University
- Occupation: Journalist
- Spouse: Rosemary Schalk (m. 1957; died 2007)
- Children: 5

George Edmund Lardner Jr. (August 10, 1934 – September 21, 2019) was an American journalist for The Washington Post who won the Pulitzer Prize for Feature Writing in 1993. Lardner wrote a book about the murder of his daughter Kristin, called The Stalking of Kristin: A Father Investigates the Murder of His Daughter.
