= Robert Hilder =

American judge (1949–2017)

Robert Keith Hilder
- Born: 1949 May 15; Sydney, Australia
- Died: 2017 April 26
- Education: B.S in Political Science, University of Utah
- Occupations: Attorney, Judge

Robert K. Hilder (May 15, 1949 – April 26, 2017) was a Third Judicial District Court Judge in Utah. The Third District consists of Salt Lake, Summit, and Tooele counties. He was elected Summit County attorney and was sworn in on January 5, 2015. Prior to that he did extensive mediation and arbitration work.

== Early life and education ==
Hilder immigrated to the United States in 1977 from Sydney. Adelaide, Australia. He graduated from law school in 1984, the same year he became a U.S. citizen. Charles Dickens' A Tale of Two Cities inspired Hilder and sparked his interest in law. Hilder knew he wanted to become a judge from an early age and despite a rough childhood growing up. He held a variety of jobs growing up in Australia including working in the banks, mines and as a bouncer in a local pub.

Hilder received his bachelor's degree from the University of Utah where he was elected to Phi Beta Kappa. In 1984 he received his J.D. degree from the University of Utah College of Law, where he served on the Utah Law Review.

== Legal career ==
Hilder worked part-time at the Salt Lake City law firm of Christensen & Jensen as a clerk during law school. After graduating he joined the firm practicing civil litigation and eventually working his way up to managing director of the law firm. Hilder teaches pretrial practice as an adjunct professor at the S.J. Quinney College of Law.

== Judicial career ==
Hilder was appointed to the Third Judicial District Court on August 1, 1995, by Governor Michael O. Leavitt.

Hilder has been called "one of the kindest, most compassionate, gentlest people to sit on the bench."

Hilder has served as the Presiding Judge of the Third District since 2007. He has also served on the Judicial Performance Evaluation Committee, the Utah Judicial Council and the Administrative Governing Body of the Utah Court System.

Hilder was nominated in 2008 by Governor Jon M. Huntsman Jr. to be appointed to the Utah Court of Appeals. Hilder's appointment was actively opposed by the Utah gun lobby because of a decision he made in a case involving the ability of the University of Utah to regulate the carrying of concealed weapons on campus. Hilder sided with the university and the legislature subsequently mooted his decision by amending the law. Although the Senate Judicial Confirmation Committee recommended confirmation on a 3–2 vote, the full Senate declined to confirm him on a 16–12 vote against confirmation. The Utah State Bar actively supported Hilder's appointment and the matter generated considerable public controversy.

Hilder was re-elected in the 2010 retention election 151,876 to 54,350. Prior to the 2010 election, Hilder was certified by the Utah Judicial Council as having successfully passed his Judicial Performance Evaluations by attorneys, jurors and staff.

In 2010 the Utah State Bar awarded Hilder with the 2010 Judge of the Year Award.

=== Rulings ===
Hilder ruled that the University of Utah could prohibit guns on its campus. As a result, his proposed appointment to the Court of Appeals was opposed by gun lobbyists. One of the leaders of the opposition to his appointment was Michael G. Waddoups, who was a major advocate of guns on university campuses.

Hilder also heard the case involving Paul Wayment, and sentenced him to jail even though the prosecutor had not asked for such. Wayment committed suicide due to apparent remorse at the accidental death of his son. Hilder's involvement in the Wayment case was profiled in Barry Siegel's feature story "A Father's Pain, a Judge's Duty, and a Justice Beyond Their Reach," which won the Pulitzer Prize for Feature Writing.

== Death ==
Hilder died on April 26, 2017, of esophageal cancer.

== Sources ==
- Utah State Courts http://www.utcourts.gov/judgesbios/showGallery.asp?dist=3&ct_type=D
- Richard Piatt. "Supreme Court Says University of Utah Can't Ban Guns." KSL. September 8, 2006. http://www.ksl.com/index.php?nid=148&sid=478103
- Thomson, Linda (November 25, 2008). "Hilder thinks people will hesitate to apply for Utah judgeships". Deseret News. Salt Lake City. Archived from the original on October 25, 2012 – via HighBeam Research.
