= Katie Engelhart =

Canadian journalist

Katie Engelhart is a Canadian journalist. She is a contributing writer for The New York Times.

In 2021, she published The Inevitable: Dispatches on The Right to Die which explores the right to die movement.

She won the 2024 Pulitzer Prize for Feature Writing "for her fair-minded portrait of a family’s legal and emotional struggles during a matriarch’s progressive dementia that sensitively probes the mystery of a person’s essential self."
