= Angelo Henderson =

American journalist

Angelo B. Henderson (c. 1962 – February 15, 2014) was an American journalist, radio broadcaster and minister from Detroit, MI. In 1999, Henderson won the Pulitzer Prize for Distinguished Feature Writing. Henderson remains the only African American journalist to win the Pulitzer Prize for The Wall Street Journal.

As part of Henderson's advocacy efforts to encourage Detroit citizens to embrace civic involvement, he co-founded The Detroit 300, a citizen's patrol group aiding Detroit police; the Angelo B. Henderson Community Commitment Award has since been established in his name.
