= Bette Swenson Orsini =

American journalist

Bette Swenson Orsini (December 2, 1925 – March 26, 2011) was an American journalist for the St. Petersburg Times. In 1980, she won the Pulitzer Prize for National Reporting with Charles Stafford for an investigation of the Church of Scientology.

== Biography ==
Orsini was born on December 2, 1925, in St. Petersburg, Florida. After attending both St. Petersburg High School and St. Petersburg Junior College, she attended the University of Florida, and graduated with a Bachelor of Arts in psychology. Afterwards, Orsini worked for the St. Petersburg Times, the Arkansas Democrat-Gazette, and the Richmond News Leader. Orsini spent forty-one years working at the St. Petersburg Times, beginning in 1946. That year, she placed second in a national contest for the "best-looking newspaperwoman". Orsini was also a body double for Lizabeth Scott in Dead Reckoning (1947). She was also a marathon waterskier. By 1963, she was the education reporter for the paper. The following year, she was involved in a marathon ski run from St. Petersburg to New York City for the 1964 New York World's Fair. Over 28 days, a ten-person group skied the 1,400 miles (2,300 km) to New York. For her reporting, Orsini received the American Political Science Association Public Affairs Reporting award (1967) and a National Headliners Award (1970). In 1974, after an exposé of a scandal involving Floyd T. Christian, she received a Scripps Howard Foundation Award.

Orsini began investigating the Church of Scientology and its expansion into Clearwater, Florida, in the middle of the 1970s. Over three years of investigating, she and Stafford published fourteen stories that criticized the church, investigating its belief system and corrupt practices. By 1976, a church memo was issued that deemed Stafford and Orsini 'enemies' of the church, and stated that their ranks should be infiltrated. In an obituary published in the Tampa Bay Times, she was called the "prime source of stories about Scientology's financial and social structure". The church repeatedly attempted to get Orsini fired, and otherwise attempted to stop her reporting. For this series of articles, she won the Pulitzer Prize for National Reporting in 1980. She died on March 26, 2011.
