= Sheryl James =

American journalist and author (born 1951)

- Born: Sheryl Teresa James; October 7, 1951 (age 75); Detroit, Michigan, U.S.
- Education: Eastern Michigan University (B.S.)
- Occupations: Journalist, Author
- Spouse: Eric Vigmostad
- Writing career
- Language: English
- Notable awards: Pulitzer Prize for Feature Writing

Sheryl Teresa James (born October 7, 1951) is an American Pulitzer Prize-winning journalist and author. She won the Pulitzer Prize for Feature Writing in 1991 for a series she wrote in the St. Petersburg Times about a mother who deserted her baby. Her reporting has also been in the Detroit Free Press, the Greensboro News and Record, and City Magazine in Lansing, Michigan.

== Early life ==
James was born on October 7, 1951, to Reese and Dava James in Detroit, Michigan. After growing up in the area, she attended Eastern Michigan University, where she received a B.S. in English in 1973.

== Journalism career ==
In 1979, James got her first job in journalism at City Magazine in Lansing, Michigan. She worked there as a staff writer and editor for three years, before moving to North Carolina after being hired by the Greensboro News and Record in 1982. She went on to join the St. Petersburg Times as a feature writer in 1986.

During her time in St. Petersburg, Florida, James also worked for the Poynter Institute as a consultant, and provided instruction for high school newspapers in the area.

James was the recipient of the 1991 Pulitzer Prize for Feature Writing for her series "A Gift Abandoned," which the Pulitzer board called "a compelling series about a mother who abandoned her newborn child and how it affected her life and those of others."

The following year, James was a finalist in the same category for her series "Life From Death," which was described by the Pulitzer board as a "gripping account of the effort to transplant the organs of a dead boy and turn the tragedy of his death into a gift of life for others."

James returned to Michigan in 1991 to work as a staff writer for the Detroit Free Press, where she remained for over a decade.

Since 1999, James has written two books about the history of Michigan, which range in subject matter from a biography of local artist Gwen Frostic to the state's folk heritage.

James currently works as a freelance journalist for publications including Michigan Today and the Toledo Blade. She has also worked as a specialist in public relations for the University of Michigan's School of Information.

== Personal life ==
James identifies as Roman Catholic. She married her husband, Eric Vigmostad, in 1974. They have two children, named Teresa and Kelsey. As of 2017, James and Vigmostad lived in Brighton, Michigan.

== Books ==
- The Life and Wisdom of Gwen Frostic (1999)
- Michigan Legends: Folktales and Lore from the Great Lakes State (2013)
