= Anand Gopal =

American journalist

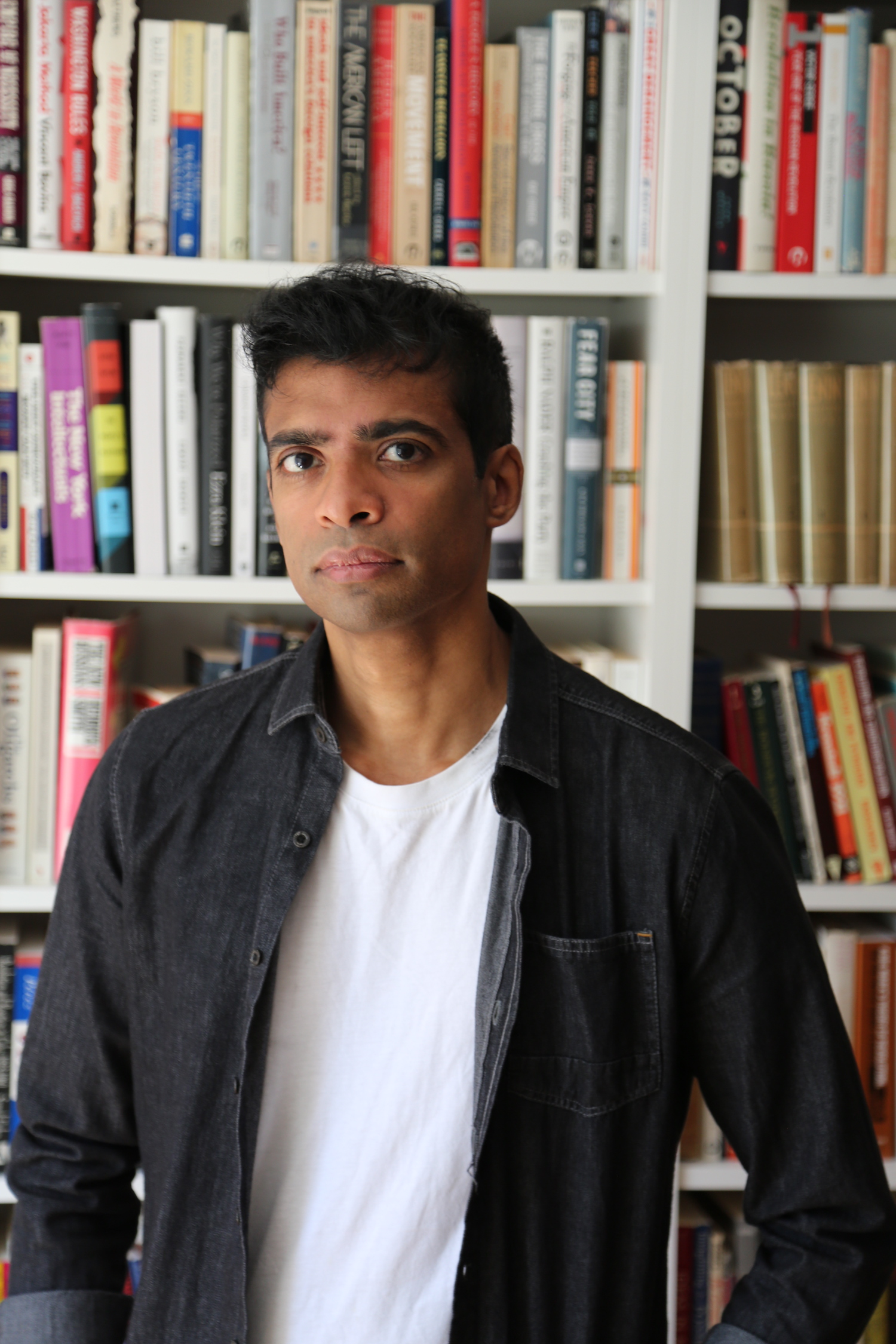
- Gopal in 2022
- Occupation: Journalist
- Known for: Coverage of the Middle East

Anand Gopal is an American writer who contributes to The New Yorker and the author of Days of Love and Rage: A Story of Ordinary People Forging a Revolution, a work of narrative nonfiction about a group of revolutionaries who overthrew a dictator. He is also the author of No Good Men Among the Living: America, the Taliban and the War through Afghan Eyes, which describes the travails of three Afghans caught in the war on terror. It was a finalist for the 2015 Pulitzer Prize for General Nonfiction and the 2014 National Book Award for Nonfiction. He has won many major journalism prizes, including the National Magazine Award, for his writing on conflict and the Middle East. Gopal is a professor of practice at Arizona State University, affiliated with the Center for the Study of Religion and Conflict, School of Politics and Global Studies, and Future Security Initiative.

== Career ==
Gopal is notable for his writing on conflict and revolutions. In 2017, writing for The New York Times Magazine, he helped expose the vast number of civilians killed by US aerial campaigns in Iraq and Syria. He has reported extensively from those countries, including a feature on the crimes of anti-ISIS militias for The Atlantic, which won a George Polk Award.

He is believed to be one of the few Western journalists to have embedded with the Taliban, an experience that forms part of the basis of No Good Men Among the Living, In 2012 Gopal reported for Harper's Magazine on the town of Taftanaz in Syria, which suffered a massacre at the hands of the regime of Bashar al-Assad. In 2014 he reported for Harper's on a murderous US-backed police chief in Kandahar, Afghanistan. In January 2010, Gopal published a story about secret prisons in Afghanistan run by US Joint Special Operations Command. That same year, Gopal also conducted a rare interview via email with Gulbuddin Hekmatyar, the reclusive leader of one of the Taliban's most important allies.

Gopal was a resident of Manhattan when terrorists attacked the World Trade Center on September 11, 2001.

== Awards ==
His book was a finalist for the 2015 Pulitzer Prize for General Nonfiction, the 2014 National Book Award for Nonfiction, and the 2015 Helen Bernstein Award. It was awarded the 2015 Ridenhour Prize for demonstrating "why the United States' emphasis on counterterrorism at the expense of nation-building and reconciliation inadvertently led to the Taliban's resurgence after 2001."

== Bibliography ==
=== Books ===
- Days of Love and Rage : A Story of Revolution. New York: Simon and Schuster. 2026.
- No Good Men Among the Living : America, the Taliban, and the War through Afghan Eyes. New York: Metropolitan Books. 2014.

=== Essays and reporting ===
- "Clean hands : in Raqqa, U.S. bombs killed many Syrians. No Americans died. Is this moral?". The Critics. Books. The New Yorker. 96 (41): 74–77. December 21, 2020. (Note: Online version is titled "America's war on Syrian civilians".)
- "The Other Afghan Women". A Reporter at Large. The New Yorker. 97 (28): 34–47. September 13, 2021.
- "Invisible City". A Reporter at Large. The New Yorker. 100 (5): 34–47. March 18, 2024.
