= Murder of Kristin Lardner =

1992 murder in Boston, Massachusetts

- Location: Commonwealth Avenue, Boston, Massachusetts, U.S.
- Date: May 20, 1992; 34 years ago
- Attack type: Murder by shooting, murder-suicide, stalking
- Deaths: 2 (including the perpetrator)
- Victim: Kristin Lardner
- Perpetrator: Michael Cartier

On May 30, 1992, 21-year-old Kristin Lardner was murdered in Boston, Massachusetts, by her ex-boyfriend Michael Cartier, who later killed himself.

The incident was also known as the Brookline murder. Cartier stalked and shot Lardner, who had a restraining order against him, before shooting himself.

Lardner's father George later released a book about the murder, called The Stalking of Kristin: A Father Investigates the Murder of His Daughter, receiving a Pulitzer Prize.

Cartier was a punk rock enthusiast who, a month prior to the murder, had tried to attack Kathleen Hanna of Bikini Kill at a show. He was described as "a nightclub bouncer with a short fuse".

== See also ==
- List of homicides in Massachusetts
