= Diana Marcum =

American writer

- Born: 1963; Sonoma County, California, U.S.
- Died: August 9, 2023 (age 60); Fresno, California, U.S.
- Occupations: Writer, journalist

Diana Marcum (1963 – August 9, 2023) was an American writer and journalist, focused especially on California's Central Valley. She was a 2018 Nieman Fellow, and won the 2015 Pulitzer Prize for Feature Writing, for her series "Scenes from California's Dust Bowl".

== Early life and education ==
Marcum was born in Sonoma County, California. She attended but did not graduate from Crafton Hills College.

== Career ==
Marcum worked as an assistant at The San Bernardino Sun as a young woman, then became a reporter. She was a reporter and a columnist at The Fresno Bee, and was on the staff of the Los Angeles Times from 2011 to 2022. She often wrote about California's Central Valley and the people and communities who live there, but she also wrote two book-length travel memoirs, about the Azores and Belize.

Marcum won the Pulitzer Prize for Feature Writing in 2015, for "offering nuanced portraits of lives affected by the state's drought, bringing an original and empathic perspective to the story" in her Los Angeles Times series "Scenes from California's Dust Bowl". She was awarded a Nieman Fellowship in 2018. "If we only write about the bad, that’s not a complete picture.There is a lot of perseverance and faith and friendship and humor. There’s everything. It’s a big, complex world of good and bad. And the good counts", she explained about her storytelling in 2015.

== Publications ==
=== Books ===
- The Tenth Island: Finding Joy, Beauty, and Unexpected Love in the Azores (2018)
- The Fallen Stones: Chasing Butterflies, Discovering Mayan Secrets, and Looking for Hope Along the Way (2021)

=== Articles and essays ===
- "On the front lines" (1994, about medical emergency personnel in the aftermath of the Northridge earthquake)
- "Bruised, not broken, by trek" (2006)
- "Closure of historic temple in Fresno dismays Japanese American community" (2011)
- "Orange food stand to be reborn" (2012)
- "Scenes from California's Dust Bowl" (2014)
- "Let the Interlopers In" (2016)
- "An American Road Trip Through Troubled Times" (2021)
- "In the Ashes of the Devastating Sierra Fire, A Flower Farm Blooms" (2022)
- "A Cambodian American police officer helps his community heal and look forward" (2022)

== Personal life ==
Marcum died in 2023, at the age of 60, in Fresno, California, after surgery to remove a brain tumor.
