= Amy Ellis Nutt =

American journalist and author

- Born: April 26, 1955 (age 71); Staten Island, New York, U.S.
- Education: Columbia University Graduate School of Journalism (M.S.) Massachusetts Institute of Technology (M.S.) Smith College (B.A.)
- Occupations: Journalist, Author
- Writing career
- Language: English
- Notable awards: Pulitzer Prize for Feature Writing

Amy Ellis Nutt is a Washington, D.C.–based journalist and a New York Times bestselling author. She was the recipient of the 2011 Pulitzer Prize for Feature Writing for her reporting at The Star-Ledger on the 2009 wreck of the Lady Mary fishing vessel. She has also worked as a health and science writer for The Washington Post and a writer-reporter at Sports Illustrated.

== Early life ==
Nutt was born on April 26, 1955, to David and Grace Nutt in Staten Island, New York, and subsequently grew up in central New Jersey, where she was the third of five children. Raised in Scotch Plains, New Jersey, Nutt attended Scotch Plains-Fanwood High School, where she graduated in 1973; Nutt was inducted into the school's hall of fame in 2018.

She attended Smith College, where she received a B.A. in English and Philosophy in 1977, before eventually matriculating to MIT, where she earned a Master of Science in Philosophy in 1985. Afterward, she briefly worked as a philosophy instructor at Tufts University and the University of Massachusetts.

== Journalism career ==
After receiving her M.S., Nutt enrolled in Ph.D. programs at both Boston College and MIT, but lost interest and did not complete them. Afterward, she took a fact-checking job at Sports Illustrated during the 1988 Summer Olympics. She remained with Sports Illustrated for nine years thereafter, eventually being promoted to a reporting position.

During her time at Sports Illustrated, Nutt pursued a Master of Science in Journalism from the Columbia University Graduate School of Journalism, and has worked intermittently as an adjunct professor at the university since her graduation in 1995.

In 1997, Nutt joined The Star-Ledger in New Jersey as a staff writer, where she remained until 2014. During her tenure at the newspaper, she was a Nieman Fellow at Harvard University from 2004 to 2005, and a Ferris Professor of Journalism at Princeton University from 2013 to 2014.

Nutt was a finalist for the 2009 Pulitzer Prize in Feature Writing for her series "The Accidental Artist," and won the 2011 Pulitzer Prize in the same category for her story "The Wreck of the Lady Mary."

In 2014, she joined the national staff of the Washington Post, writing for the health, science and environment team through 2018.

Amy Ellis Nutt contributed to numerous while she was employed by The Washington Post, covering subjects including autism, suicide, and brain research, among others.

She has published three books, two of which have become New York Times bestsellers. Her 2015 book, Becoming Nicole: The Transformation of an American Family, was a finalist for the Lambda Literary Award for Transgender Nonfiction. She has received a contract for a fourth book.

== Books ==
- Shadows Bright as Glass: The Remarkable Story of One Man's Journey from Brain Trauma to Artistic Triumph (2011) ISBN 1439143102
- The Teenage Brain: A Neuroscientist's Survival Guide to Raising Adolescents and Young Adults (2015, with Frances E. Jensen)
- Becoming Nicole: The Transformation of an American Family (2015)
