= The Plains Across =

1979 history book by John D. Unruh, Jr.

The Plains Across: The Overland Emigrants on the Trans-Mississippi West, 1840–60
- First edition
- Author: John D. Unruh, Jr.
- Language: English
- Genre: Non-fiction
- Publisher: University of Illinois Press
- Publication date: 1979
- Publication place: United States

The Plains Across: The Overland Emigrants on the Trans-Mississippi West, 1840–60 is a 1979 history book by John D. Unruh, Jr., first published by the University of Illinois Press, about on overland travel across the Great Plains prior to the Civil War. It was a finalist for the 1980 Pulitzer Prize for History.

The book was a revised doctoral dissertation written at the University of Kansas under George L. Anderson and Clifford S. Griffin. It covers mainly the Oregon, California, and Mormon Trails.

== Chapters ==
Introduction: The Historians and the Overlanders
1. Public Opinion, 1840-48
2. Public Opinion, 1849-60
3. Motivations and Beginnings
4. Emigrant Interaction
5. Emigrant-Indian Interaction
6. The Federal Government
7. Private Entrepreneurs, 1840-49
8. Private Entrepreneurs, 1850-60
9. The Mormon "Halfway House"
10. West Coast Assistance
11. The Overlanders in Historical Perspective.

== Evaluations ==
The evaluations by professional historians had been highly favorable. Wilbur Jacobs says:

This volume is unquestionably a major contribution, a tour de force, in the corpus of scholarship on the American West. Any careful reader cannot help but be impressed with the author's persistence in sifting a massive data base to bring us an original, revisionist study on a subject that has occupied generations of able historians of the frontier. Although there is a wealth of detail on almost every one of its five hundred pages, the book still has clarity of style, and a meaningful argument in interpreting the facts.

Martin Ridge says:

Unruh read the secondary literature from anthologies to pot boilers, combed the newspapers of the great era of the trail-1840-1860-for accounts and perceptions of the West, and analyzed more than ten score diaries, both published and unpublished. Conflicting statements were reconciled; numerical data were corrected; and reminiscences were tested against facts-all with revisionist results, for myths tumble like ten pins in Unruh's retelling of the trail narrative. The nature of Indian-white contact, for example, is less a tale of violence and theft on the plains and more a case of cooperation and assistance by the tribes and diffidence and abuse by whites, especially in the 1840s. Indian violence shrinks in scale as does, for that matter, the level of violence in general within Unruh's double decade paradigm....In all, Unruh concludes, there were more Indians killed by whites than whites killed by Indians.

Earl Pomeroy says:

His great themes are that emigration was more significantly collective process than individual adventure and that from year to year emigrants depended in- creasingly on the help and experience of others.

== Editions ==
- Champaign: University of Illinois Press, 1979. LoC 78-9781. ISBN 0-252-00698-4
- John David Unruh (1993). The Plains Across: The Overland Emigrants and the Trans-Mississippi West, 1840-60. University of Illinois Press. ISBN 978-0-252-06360-2.
