= William A. Henry III =

American cultural critic and author (1950–1994)

- Born: William Alfred Henry; January 24, 1950; South Orange, New Jersey, US
- Died: June 28, 1994 (aged 44); Maidenhead, Berkshire, England
- Education: Yale University (BA)
- Occupation: Cultural critic

William Alfred Henry III (January 24, 1950 – June 28, 1994) was an American cultural critic and Pulitzer Prize-winning author.

== Career ==
Henry lived in North Plainfield, New Jersey as a young man. He graduated from Yale in 1971 and began his career in journalism in Boston, writing for the Boston Globe. His coverage of school desegregation in Boston won a Pulitzer Prize in 1975. He also wrote on the arts for the Globe, winning a second Pulitzer for his television criticism in 1980.

In the 1980s he worked as an arts critic for Time magazine, while pursuing his interests in cultural criticism and in American politics. Among his articles for Time was a story critical of the Hollywood trade newspapers in their cozy relationship in an industry town. In 1984, he wrote Visions of America, an account of the American presidential campaign of that year. His 1990 video documentary of Bob Fosse, Steam Heat, won an Emmy. He also wrote a 1992 biography of Jackie Gleason, The Great One.

His final book was In Defense of Elitism, a work of social and cultural criticism that argued that societies and cultures might be ranked on a spectrum ranging from 'egalitarianism' to 'elitism', and that the contemporary United States had moved too far away from the latter; a view he defended with reference to college education, multiculturalism, and other topics. He died of a heart attack on June 28, 1994, while the book was coming to press.

== Publications ==
- Henry, William A. (1985). Visions of America : how we saw the 1984 election. Boston: Atlantic Monthly Press. ISBN 9780871130129. OCLC 564291516.
- Henry, William A. (1992). The Great One: The Life and Legend of Jackie Gleason. Doubleday. ISBN 978-0-385-41533-0. OCLC 651898009 – via Internet Archive.
- Henry, William A. (1994). In Defense of Elitism. New York: Doubleday. ISBN 978-0-385-47943-1. OCLC 30155600.
