= Jennifer Gonnerman =

American Writer

Jennifer Gonnerman is an American journalist who has been a staff writer for The New Yorker since 2015. Prior to joining The New Yorker, Gonnerman was a staff writer for The Village Voice.

== "Before the Law" ==
Gonnerman's 2015 piece in The New Yorker, "Before the Law", reported on the 2010-2013 imprisonment of Kalief Browder at Rikers Island Prison (with most of that time spent in solitary confinement) for allegedly stealing a backpack. Browder would be released from prison in 2013 without being charged with any crimes. Browder later died by suicide in 2015. Before the Law was a finalist for the 2015 Pulitzer Prize for Feature Writing.

== Life on the Outside ==
Gonnerman's 2004 book Life on the Outside: The Prison Odyssey of Elaine Bartlett was a finalist for the 2004 National Book Award for Nonfiction. Life on the Outside details the arrest and imprisonment of Elaine Bartlett for drug charges, as well as her difficulties re-integrating into society after her release from prison 16 years later. Bartlett, living in financial hardship, had travelled from New York City to Albany, New York with her boyfriend to sell cocaine. Unbeknownst to her, the drug dealer who provided her with the potential buyer in Albany was a police informant and Bartlett sells the cocaine to an undercover police officer. Gonnerman explains how the draconian Rockefeller Drug Laws (named after New York governor Nelson Rockefeller) imposed minimum sentences of at least 20 years in prison (also known as "20 years to life") even for attempting to sell relatively small amounts of drugs. Many other states soon adopted similarly punitive anti-drug laws. Despite this being Bartlett's first drug offense (and despite having four children at the time of conviction, aged 10, 6, 3 and 1), she was sentenced to 20 years in prison. She was later pardoned after serving 16 years of her sentence. Most of the book details Bartlett's struggles to re-integrate into society upon her release from prison in 2000 including finding housing, a job and rejoining her family. All of which Gonnerman argues are severely difficult for ex-convicts in American society. Bartlett also protested against strict drug laws in the United States after her release. Writing for The New York Times, Brent Staples stated that the piece is a "moving and well-reported book".
