= Bonnie M. Anderson =

American journalist

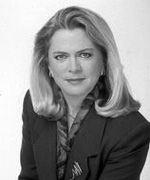
- Born: October 22, 1955 (age 71); Cuba
- Education: Northwestern University's Medill School of Journalism, University of Barcelona in Spain

Bonnie M. Anderson (born October 22, 1955) is a veteran news reporter. Anderson got her start covering Latin America and the Miami Hispanic community for El Miami Herald in Miami. After a year reporting for WPLG-TV in Miami, the ABC affiliate, she worked for NBC News as one of the network's two Latin America correspondents. She later served as a correspondent for the network posted in Beirut and Rome, before joining The Miami News as a columnist. Just prior to joining CNN in 1992, Anderson served a four-year stint with WTVJ in Miami.

Her first position at CNN was a national correspondent, where she covered such top breaking news stories as the Oklahoma City bombing in 1995, the Los Angeles earthquake in 1994, Pope John Paul II's 1995 visit to Denver, Hurricane Andrew in South Florida in 1992 and the Branch Davidian stand-off in Waco, Texas, in 1993. She also produced numerous documentaries on cutting-edge topics such as incest and priest pedophilia. Anderson was one of the first female war correspondents in the industry and has reported from over 100 countries. During her time with NBC and CNN she was shot at – and wounded while reporting.

Anderson served as an anchor and as an international war correspondent before rising to the position of managing editor of CNN en Español, CNN's fledgling 24-hour Spanish language news network. She formed part of the core group that developed, launched and supervised the network for the first three years. During her final years with CNN, Anderson acted as vice president in charge of recruiting and talent development for the CNN News Group. In 2002 Anderson was unceremoniously terminated from CNN for refusing to comply with a hiring policy she considered “unethical, unprincipled, immoral, and potentially illegal.” She filed suit against CNN in August 2003.

== Awards ==
- Seven Emmy Awards
- Being named as a finalist for the Pulitzer Prize for Feature Writing
- She was inducted into the Medill School of Journalism Hall of Achievement in November 2000
- She was nominated for the Maria Coors Cabot Lifetime Achievement Award – sponsored by Columbia University.

== Early life ==
Bonnie Anderson was born, in Cuba, on October 22, 1955, to Howard and Dorothy Anderson and is the youngest of four children. She lived in Cuba for only five years before her family was moved to Miami, Florida. She was raised primarily in Colombia and is fluent in Spanish and English. In addition to her journalism degree from Northwestern's Medill School of Journalism, she has studied at the University of Barcelona in Spain.

== Family history ==
Howard F. Anderson moved his wife and, at the time, his only child to Cuba in 1947, where he ran a small string of family-owned gas stations, factories and a Jeep distributorship. After Fidel Castro took power of the Cuban government in 1959 anti-American sentiment began to grow as the political climate became increasingly volatile. Charged with smuggling arms into Cuba, Howard Anderson was taken into custody by Cuban military forces in March 1961. His summary trial began on April 17, 1961 – the day that the Bay of Pigs invasion was launched. Howard Anderson was sentenced to death less than two hours into his trial, and was the first American to be executed by Fidel Castro’ forces. He died by firing squad on April 19, 1961. He was survived by his wife, Dorothy, and his four children; Gary, Marc, Lee and Bonnie.

== Other work ==
In 2004 she authored the book, “News Flash – Journalism, Infotainment, and the Bottom-Line Business of Broadcast News.” The book garnered national attention for exposing illegal hiring practices, political cheerleading and ethnocentric coverage in the network news industry. She details how the news networks, in their pursuit of market share and increased profits, favor “infotainment” programming over substantive journalism. She argues that passing infotainment off as news is detrimental to the American public. She offers that integral journalism enables “Americans to make well-informed decisions about how to exercise their rights and responsibilities as citizens.”

After leaving CNN, Anderson established The Anderson Media Agency, Inc. which offered a broad range of media-related services for individuals, corporations, government officials and journalists. There, she specialized in coaching in voice control and inflection, pacing, breath control, TelePrompTer reading, confidence building techniques, script writing, anchoring, audio tracking and on-camera performance.

An avid angler, Ms. Anderson set a world record on April 4, 2009, when she landed a 151-pound Atlantic Blue Marlin with a 16-pound tippet off the coast of the Dominican Republic.

Anderson currently resides in St. Croix US Virgin Islands.
