= 2026 Pulitzer Prize =

Awards for journalism and related fields

The 2026 Pulitzer Prizes were awarded on May 4, 2026 by the Pulitzer Prize Board for works created during the 2025 calendar year.

== Prizes ==
=== Journalism ===
Public Service
The Washington Post "For piercing the veil of secrecy around the Trump administration's chaotic overhaul of federal agencies and chronicling in rich detail the human impacts of the cuts and the consequences for the country."
The Wall Street Journal, for work led by Khadeeja Safdar and Joe Palazzolo, "Revelatory and forensic stories that helped provoke the release of millions of Justice Department files about Jeffrey Epstein’s powerful network."
Chicago Tribune "For its powerful coverage of the Trump administration’s militarized immigration sweep of the city that described in vivid, muscular prose how the siege-like incursion of ICE agents unified Chicagoans in resistance." (Moved by the Board to the Local Reporting category.)

Breaking News Reporting
Staff of The Minnesota Star Tribune "For its coverage of a shooting at a back-to-school Mass at a Catholic school that left two children dead and 28 wounded, powerful stories marked by thoroughness and compassion."
Staff of the The Wall Street Journal, "For their comprehensive and compelling coverage of deadly Texas flooding, including the failures and technical errors that led to the tragedy and heartrending narratives of its impact."
Staff of the Southern California News Group, "For their coverage of the unrelenting wildfires that ravaged Los Angeles communities and killed 31 people, reporting that included the fires’ immediate aftermath and accountability-driven analysis."
Staff of The Seattle Times, "For its coverage of catastrophic flooding from a major storm system that remained over the Pacific Northwest for days, work that in real time warned residents, relayed the stories of affected communities and explained how weather and geography combined to cause the devastation."

Investigative Reporting
Staff of The New York Times, "For deeply reported stories that exposed how President Trump has shattered constraints on conflicts of interest and exploited the moneymaking opportunities that come with power, enriching his family and allies."
Debbie Cenziper, Megan Rose, and Brandon Roberts of ProPublica, "For exposing how the Food and Drug Administration allowed the import of generic drugs from foreign factories that violated safety standards – with potentially lethal consequences for unsuspecting Americans."
Cynthia Dizikes and Joaquin Palomino of the San Francisco Chronicle, "For their meticulous and heart-wrenching reporting on California’s psychiatric hospitals that put profits over patients and endangered some of the state’s most vulnerable citizens."

Explanatory Reporting
Susie Neilson, Megan Fan Munce, and Sara DiNatale of the San Francisco Chronicle, "For their series “Burned,” which showed how insurance companies using algorithmic tools have failed Californians who lost their homes to fire by systematically undervaluing their properties, denying claims and making it impossible for them to rebuild."
Brett Murphy and Anna Maria Barry-Jester of ProPublica, "For an authoritative and consequential examination of the Trump administration’s freeze of humanitarian aid through the U.S. Agency for International Development, coverage that illuminated how the dismantling of the agency placed hundreds of thousands of people at risk, contradicted official assurances that lifesaving programs remained active and led to preventable deaths."
Staff of Bloomberg, "For reporting on a new generation of so-called “revolutionary” cancer drugs that revealed how pharmaceutical companies, lobbyists and medical entrepreneurs have reaped huge profits while failing to show that the drugs have extended people's lives."

Beat Reporting
Jeff Horwitz and Engen Tham of Reuters, "For inventive and revelatory reporting on Meta that detailed the technology company’s willingness to expose users, including children, to scams and AI manipulation."
Nick Miroff of The Atlantic "For his sustained and vigorous coverage of the Trump administration’s immigration crackdown, which included reporting on a deportee sent to El Salvador’s Terrorism Confinement Center and on immigration enforcement officers facing daily deportation quotas."
Hamed Aleaziz of The New York Times, "For deeply moving and insightful immigration coverage that held powerful federal agencies to account and revealed the agonizing choices faced by migrants whose lives were upended by the Trump administration’s policies."

Local Reporting
Dave Altimari and Ginny Monk of The Connecticut Mirror and Sophie Chou and Haru Coryne of ProPublica, "For an impressive series exposing how the state’s unique towing laws favored unscrupulous companies that overcharged residents, prompting swift and meaningful consumer protections."
Staff of the Chicago Tribune, "For its powerful coverage of the Trump administration’s militarized immigration sweep of the city that described in vivid, muscular prose how the siege-like incursion of ICE agents unified Chicagoans in resistance." (Moved by the Board from the Public Service category, where it was originally entered and nominated.)
Liz Bowie, Greg Morton, Ryan Little and Allan James Vestal of The Baltimore Banner, "For coverage, including datasets and immersive storytelling, that showed how Baltimore’s transit system forces long commutes on students, exposing them to potential dangers and causing them to miss classes, reporting that inspired a community search for solutions."
Staffs of the Miami Herald and WLRN, "For a dynamically illustrated, data-driven series that exposed the human cost behind the high-speed Brightline railroad, which has killed more people per mile than any other passenger rail system, reporting that triggered the release of safety funding and new crossing standards."

National Reporting
Staff of Reuters, notably Ned Parker, Linda So, Peter Eisler and Mike Spector, "For documenting how the president used the U.S. government and the influence of his supporters to expand executive power and exact vengeance on his foes."
Staff of Bloomberg, "For coverage of the Trump administration’s deregulation of cryptocurrencies, which revealed conflicts of interest within a complex industry filled with unusual characters."
Staff of The Washington Post, "For reporting that tracked the impact of the Trump administration’s mass deportation campaign, following it from a Chicago park to the White House, a tent encampment in Texas and a Salvadoran prison."

International Reporting
Dake Kang, Garance Burke, Byron Tau, Aniruddha Ghosal and Yael Grauer of Associated Press, "For an astonishing global investigation into state-of-the-art tools of mass surveillance, created in Silicon Valley, advanced in China and spreading worldwide before returning to America for secret new uses by the U.S. Border Patrol."
Stephanie Nolen of The New York Times, "For cataloging in devastating detail the harm caused to vulnerable people across the developing world by the Trump administration’s abrupt dismantling of U.S. humanitarian aid, which had fought disease and promoted good health for decades."
Staff of The Wall Street Journal, notably Jared Malsin, "For its intimate, humanizing reporting that laid bare the Assad regime’s atrocities against the Syrian people over 13 years of revolution and war."

Feature Writing
Aaron Parsley of Texas Monthly "For his extraordinary personal account of survival and loss written days after the historic Central Texas floods that tore the writer’s house out from under him and his family, taking the life of his nephew."
Emily Baumgaertner Nunn of The New York Times, "For her deeply and sensitively reported narrative that chronicles the explosion of child sex trafficking in Los Angeles."
Rachel Aviv of The New Yorker, "For an extraordinary exploration of how some patients diagnosed with schizophrenia actually have autoimmune conditions—and what happens after they’re treated."

Criticism
Mark Lamster of The Dallas Morning News, "For his rigorous and passionate architecture criticism, using wit and expertise to amplify his opinions and advocate for city residents."
Michael J. Lewis of The Wall Street Journal, "For informed and insightful writing about architecture that brings the inanimate to life and reflects a deep understanding that buildings are at once visual and civic spaces."
Vinson Cunningham of The New Yorker, "For sophisticated, accessible essays on the media, with an emphasis on television, that address shifts in culture, politics and American life with clear-eyed authority."

Opinion Writing
M. Gessen of The New York Times, "For an illuminating collection of reported essays on rising authoritarian regimes that draw on history and personal experience to probe timely themes of oppression, belonging and exile."
Nicholas Kristof of The New York Times, "For a wrenching and impactful series of columns imploring Americans to face the deadly consequences of the Trump administration’s cuts to the U.S. Agency for International Development."
Gustavo Arellano of the Los Angeles Times, "For passionate, vivid commentary on the cruelty endured by families and communities in the Los Angeles area targeted by federal mass deportation policy."

Illustrated Reporting and Commentary
Anand RK and Suparna Sharma, contributors, and Natalie Obiko Pearson of Bloomberg, "For “trAPPed,” a riveting account of a neurologist in India held under “digital arrest” by her phone, reporting that uses visuals and words to cast light on the growing global challenges of surveillance and digital scams."
Ivan Ehlers, freelancer, "For an impressive collection addressing contemporary issues, including economics, climate and immigration, that shows extraordinary range, deft artistry and powerful commentary from an emerging visual journalist."
Peter Kuper, freelancer, "For a portfolio of vibrant and wordless political cartoons on the climate crisis, politics and emerging technology rendered with a fresh perspective and a unique approach to visual storytelling."
Adolfo Arranz, Poppy McPherson, Devjyot Ghoshal and Han Huang of Reuters, "For “Scammed into Scamming,” an insightful and beautifully rendered visual narrative depicting a multibillion-dollar digital scamming industry staffed with victims of global human trafficking."

Breaking News Photography
Saher Alghorra, contributor, The New York Times, "For his haunting, sensitive series showing the devastation and starvation in Gaza resulting from the war with Israel."
Photography Staff of the Los Angeles Times, "For images capturing the deadliest urban wildfires in Los Angeles history, revealing the chaos, destruction, and human toll as flames tore through communities."
Photography Staff of Reuters, "For coverage of wide-ranging immigration enforcement actions across the United States, a portfolio distinguished by its breadth, power and immediacy." (Moved by the jury from Feature Photography, where it was originally entered.)

Feature Photography
Jahi Chikwendiu of The Washington Post, "For a heart-wrenching and achingly beautiful photo essay on a young family welcoming the birth of their first child as the father is slowly dying from cancer."
Photography Staff of The New York Times, "For an in-depth report on the ubiquitous, deadly drone warfare devastating Ukraine." (Moved by the jury from the Breaking News Photography category, where it was originally entered.)
Gabrielle Lurie of the San Francisco Chronicle, "For a deeply intimate and sensitive series illustrating the brutal reality of the fentanyl crisis in America through three people affected by it."

Audio Reporting
Staff of Pablo Torre Finds Out, "For a pioneering and entertaining form of live podcast journalism that investigated how the Los Angeles Clippers seemingly evaded the NBA’s salary cap rules by funneling money to a star player through an environmental startup."
Azeen Ghorayshi and Austin Mitchell of The New York Times, For “The Protocol,” their comprehensive investigation of youth gender medicine, exploring its origins and uses, helping to illuminate one of the most controversial policy debates of our time."
Valerie Bauerlein, Heather Rogers, Colin McNulty, Nathan Singhapok, and Rachel Humphreys of The The Wall Street Journal, "For “Camp Swamp Road,” which uses extraordinary archival audio to investigate a 2023 fatal shooting and the flawed implementation of stand-your-ground laws."

=== Books, drama, and music ===
Fiction
Angel Down, by Daniel Kraus (Atria Books)
Audition, by Katie Kitamura (Riverhead Books)
Stag Dance: A Quartet, by Torrey Peters (Random House)

Drama
Liberation, by Bess Wohl,
Bowl EP, by Nazareth Hassan
Meet the Cartozians, by Talene Monahon

History
We the People: A History of the U.S. Constitution, by Jill Lepore (Liveright)
King of Kings: The Iranian Revolution: A Story of Hubris, Delusion and Catastrophic Miscalculation, by Scott Anderson (Doubleday)
Born in Flames: The Business of Arson and The Remaking of the American City, by Bench Ansfield (W.W. Norton & Company)

Biography
Pride and Pleasure: The Schuyler Sisters in an Age of Revolution, by Amanda Vaill (Farrar, Straus and Giroux)
True Nature: The Pilgrimage of Peter Matthiessen, by Lance Richardson (Pantheon)
The Life and Poetry of Frank Stanford, by James McWilliams (University of Arkansas Press)

Memoir or Autobiography
Things in Nature Merely Grow, by Yiyun Li (Farrar, Straus and Giroux)
Clam Down: A Metamorphosis, by Anelise Chen (One World)
Bibliophobia: A Memoir, by Sarah Chihaya (Random House)
I'll Tell You When I'm Home: A Memoir, by Hala Alyan (Avid Reader Press/Simon & Schuster)

Poetry
Ars Poeticas, by Juliana Spahr (Wesleyan University Press)
I Imagine I Been Science Fiction Always, by Douglas Kearney (Wave Books)
The Intentions of Thunder: New and Selected Poems, by Patricia Smith (Scribner)

General Nonfiction
There Is No Place for Us: Working and Homeless in America, by Brian Goldstone (Crown)
A Flower Traveled in My Blood: The Incredible True Story of the Grandmothers Who Fought to Find a Stolen Generation of Children, by Haley Cohen Gilliland (Avid Reader Press/Simon & Schuster)
Mother Emanuel: Two Centuries of Race, Resistance, and Forgiveness in One Charleston Church, by Kevin Sack (Crown)

Music
Picaflor: A Future Myth, by Gabriela Lena Frank (G. Schirmer, Inc.)
American Descent, by Andrew Rindfleisch
In the Arms of the Beloved, by Billy Childs
