= Nacha Pop =

Spanish pop/rock group

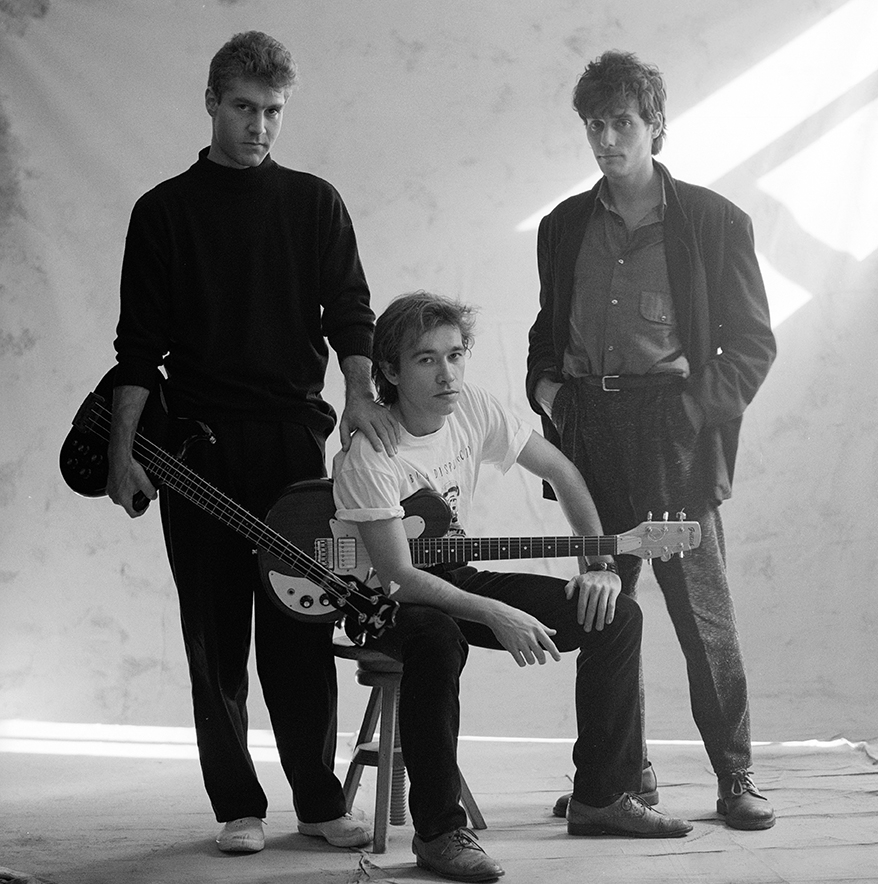
- Nacha Pop in 1988

Background information
- Origin: Spain
- Genres: Pop rock
- Years active: 1978-1988; 2007-2009; 2012-present
- Members: Nacho García Vega; Carlos Villalta "Carlos Brooking"; Antonio Martín Caruana "Ñete"
- Past members: Antonio Vega
- Website: www.nachapop.es

Nacha Pop was a Spanish pop-rock band that emerged in the 1980s, during the early years of the Madrid scene known as La Movida Madrileña. The original lineup consisted of Antonio Vega and Nacho García Vega (guitars and vocals), Carlos Brooking (bass), and Ñete (drums). The group was formed in 1978 following the dissolution of Uhu Helicopter. Nacha Pop disbanded in 1988 but reunited in 2007 before disbanding again in 2009 following the death of Antonio Vega.

== History ==
Nacha Pop released their debut self-titled album in 1980. Produced by Teddy Bautista for Hispavox and recorded at the company's studios on Torrelaguna Street in Madrid, the album featured "Chica de ayer," which became one of the band's most iconic tracks and a staple of Spanish pop music. Their second album, Buena disposición (1982), was self-produced and solidified their status as a leading band in Spain. This success led them to open for notable acts such as the Ramones and Siouxsie and The Banshees.

In 1983, they signed with the label DRO and released Más números, otras letras, recorded by Jesús N. Gómez at Doublewtronics studio in Madrid. The album included tracks like "Luz de cruce" and "Agárrate a mí," and was followed by a maxi-single featuring "Una décima de segundo." The band signed with Polydor in 1985 and recorded Dibujos animados at their Madrid studios. This album produced their first number 1 hit on the radio program Los 40 Principales with the song "Grité una noche," composed by Nacho García Vega. Ñete left the band after this album for personal reasons and continued his career with other Spanish artists.

In 1987, the band released El momento, also with Polydor and produced by Carlos Narea. The album featured tracks such as "Lucha de gigantes," "Desordenada habitación," "No se acaban las calles," and "Persiguiendo sombras." The album was recorded in Spain as well as in London, Brussels, and Bochum. Nacha Pop performed at the Plaza de Toros México in Mexico City in 1988. Later that year, they recorded the live album 80-88 at the Jácara Plató nightclub in Madrid. This album served as a farewell and became their best-selling release.

Following the band's dissolution, Nacho García Vega and Carlos Brooking, along with bassist and producer Fernando Illán, formed the group Rico, which released three albums before disbanding. Nacho García Vega released solo albums in 1995 and 2001, while Antonio Vega embarked on a successful solo career with labels including Pasión, Polydor, and EMI-Capitol.

In late 2004, a DVD was released featuring the band's last concert from sixteen years earlier. Additionally, CD reissues of Dibujos animados, El momento (previously unreleased on CD), and 80-88 were made available.

On May 8, 2007, Nacha Pop announced a reunion tour starting on June 30 in Ávila and concluding on October 26 in Madrid. The reunited band featured Antonio Vega and Nacho García Vega, supported by musicians they had worked with post-dissolution, including Goar Iñurrieta (guitar), Fernando Illán (bass), Angie Bao (drums), and Basilio Marti and Nacho Lesco (keyboards).

In 2009, Nacho García Vega and Antonio Vega began recording material for a new studio album. Although some tracks, such as "Hazme el favor," were recorded, the album was not completed due to Antonio Vega's illness.

Antonio Vega died on May 12, 2009, from lung cancer. In 2010, Nacho García Vega, Ñete, and Carlos Brooking reunited for a tribute concert to Antonio Vega at the Palacio de los Deportes in Madrid.

== Recent activity (2012–present) ==
In 2012, Nacho García Vega revived the band with new members and continued to perform the group's classic hits. In 2015, they began recording their final studio album, Efecto Inmediato, which included tracks recorded by Antonio Vega before his death, as well as contributions from Nacho García Vega and Carlos Brooking. The album was released in 2017.

== In popular culture ==
In 2000, Alejandro González Iñárritu used the Nacha Pop song "Lucha de Gigantes" in the film Amores Perros.

The song appears as a central element in the book Liliana's Invincible Summer, by Cristina Rivera Garza.

== Discography ==
- Nacha Pop (EMI-Hispavox, 1980)
- Buena disposición (EMI-Hispavox, 1982)
- Más números, otras Letras (DRO, 1983)
- Una décima de segundo (DRO, 1984), Maxi-single
- Dibujos animados (Polydor, 1985)
- El momento (Polydor, 1987)
- 80-88 (Polydor, 1988)
- Efecto Inmediato (Cera Real Discos, 2017)

=== Compilations ===
- Bravo (1996).
- Lo mejor de Nacha Pop - Rico - Antonio Vega (1997)
- Un día cualquiera: colección de canciones (2003)
- La Más Completa Colección Nacha Pop (2005)
