= Pulitzer Prize for Memoir or Autobiography =

American award for distinguished memoirs and autobiographies

The Pulitzer Prize for Memoir or Autobiography is one of the seven American Pulitzer Prizes annually awarded for Letters, Drama, and Music. The award honors "a distinguished and factual memoir or autobiography by an American author." Winners receive US$15,000.

== Recipients ==
Pulitzer Prize for Memoir or Autobiography winners and finalists
Year	Author	Title	Publisher	Rationale
2023	Hua Hsu	Stay True	Doubleday	"An elegant and poignant coming of age account that considers intense, youthful friendships but also random violence that can suddenly and permanently alter the presumed logic of our personal narratives."
2023	Chloé Cooper Jones	Easy Beauty: A Memoir	Avid Reader Press	"A spellbinding and brutally honest memoir drawing on art, travel, cultural observation and philosophical scholarship to convey the full experience of life as a disabled person whose view of humanity becomes increasingly compassionate."
2023	Chloé Cooper Jones	Easy Beauty: A Memoir	Simon and Schuster	"A spellbinding and brutally honest memoir drawing on art, travel, cultural observation and philosophical scholarship to convey the full experience of life as a disabled person whose view of humanity becomes increasingly compassionate."
2023	Ingrid Rojas Contreras	The Man Who Could Move Clouds: A Memoir	Doubleday	"A lyrical personal account that reclaims a family legacy of indigenous practices, beliefs, and narratives to challenge Western notions of history and memory."
2024	Cristina Rivera Garza	Liliana's Invincible Summer: A Sister's Search for Justice	Hogarth	"A genre-bending account of the author's 20-year-old sister, murdered by a former boyfriend, that mixes memoir, feminist investigative journalism and poetic biography stitched together with a determination born of loss."
2024	Andrew Leland	The Country of the Blind: A Memoir at the End of Sight	Penguin Press	"An emotionally resonant account by an author losing his eyesight from a rare genetic disorder, a memoir that explores the physical and conceptual experience of blindness, and that explains honestly how ableism fueled his reticence to accept his diagnosis."
2024	Jonathan Rosen	The Best Minds: A Story of Friendship, Madness, and the Tragedy of Good Intentions	Penguin Press	"An account of the author's brilliant childhood best friend and fellow student who was diagnosed as schizophrenic before fatally stabbing his girlfriend, a tragedy used to explore mental illness and the history of institutionalization."
2025	Tessa Hulls	Feeding Ghosts: A Graphic Memoir	MCD	"An affecting work of literary art and discovery whose illustrations bring to life three generations of Chinese women—the author, her mother and grandmother—and the experience of trauma handed down with family histories."
2025	Alexandra Fuller	Fi: A Memoir of My Son	Grove	"An elegiac meditation on motherhood and grief, written from the rage and pain of losing a child, but in a voice that ultimately resonates with beauty and hard-won acceptance."
2025	Lucy Sante	I Heard Her Call My Name: A Memoir of Transition	Penguin Press	"A questioning yet clear-eyed narrative of the author's journey to become who she is from who she once was, set against a vanished New York City that is profoundly part of her past."
2026	Yiyun Li	Things in Nature Merely Grow	Farrar, Straus and Giroux	"A writer's deeply moving and revelatory account of losing her younger son to suicide a little more than six years after her older son died in the same manner, an austere and defiant memoir of acceptance that focuses on facts, language and the persistence of life."
2026	Hala Alyan	I'll Tell You When I'm Home: A Memoir	Avid Reader Press	"A memoir that reimagines diaspora and the long consequences of war with literary clarity, in which the author's experiences with infertility and then motherhood are juxtaposed with an intergenerational family history."
2026	Hala Alyan	I'll Tell You When I'm Home: A Memoir	Simon and Schuster	"A memoir that reimagines diaspora and the long consequences of war with literary clarity, in which the author's experiences with infertility and then motherhood are juxtaposed with an intergenerational family history."
2026	Anelise Chen	Clam Down: A Metamorphosis	One World	"An experimental and deeply original memoir in which the writer reimagines herself as a clam, using humor and tenderness to explore a fraught relationship with her father and the pressures of being a first-generation daughter of immigrant parents."
2026	Sarah Chihaya	Bibliophobia: A Memoir	Random House	"An incisive account that illustrates how literary devotion can sustain but also endanger the self, since literature contains ideas that are perilous and revolutionary as well as restorative."
