= The Iliac Crest =

2002 novel by Cristina Rivera Garza

- Author: Cristina Rivera Garza
- Original title: La Cresta de Ilión
- Translator: Sarah Booker
- Language: Spanish
- Published: 2002 (Tusquets Editores)
- Publication date: 2017 (The Feminist Press) (English Translation)
- ISBN: 1558614354

The Iliac Crest is a novel written by Mexican novelist Cristina Rivera Garza and translated into the English language by Sarah Booker. The book was originally published in the Spanish language in 2002 before being translated into English in 2017. The book follows an unnamed narrator as he struggles with gender identity, personal identity, and the ideas of sanity, desire, fear, and freedom. It focuses on the unnamed narrator as he deals with three women who tell him he is a woman, but he attempts to debunk this idea. The novel has been met with positive reception by reviewers.

== Plot ==
The novel opens to an unnamed man reflecting on why he let a woman into his house on a dark and stormy night. The woman introduces herself as Amparo Dávila, and the narrator takes particular interest in her prominent hip bone, though he cannot remember this bone's name. Amparo approaches the narrator and claims that he used to be a tree, which greatly confuses him. Later that night, the narrator reveals that he was actually waiting for a different woman, who he refers to as the Betrayed; they were planning to end their relationship for good that night. The Betrayed shows up late and faints immediately upon arrival. Amparo begins to care for her and unpacks the Betrayed's possessions, saying that she will need to stay there for her recovery.

After a few days at the narrator's house, the narrator notices that Amparo is writing something, which she says is about her own disappearance. He begins to observe the two women and comes to the conclusion that they have created their own language structured around the word "glu." Amparo eventually asks him about his work at Serenity Shores Sanatorium, increasing his suspicions. One night, he decides to drug her in order to try to get answers out of her. She reveals that she is looking for information on a man who could have stolen a manuscript for her. The narrator recalls that the man tried to organize the terminally ill patients to demand death rather than life at the hospital, and he eventually committed suicide. Amparo says that she has not truly written since the day the man stole her manuscript. The narrator later goes to work and makes a deal with two women that he will give them a ride on a later night in exchange for permission to search through the records. He finds the man's files, which name him Juan Escutia. The narrator also stumbles upon Amparo's lost manuscript in the archives but does not reveal this to Amparo.

Later, Amparo approaches the narrator and tells him that she knows his secret: he is actually a woman. The narrator's paranoia and uncertainty about his own body and existence grow after this conversation, and he begins to constantly verify that he is a man.

The narrator follows through on his promise to give the two women in charge of the archives a ride. He accompanies them to a party and has sex with them. After leaving the party, he has the idea to look up Amparo in a phone book. He wants to contact the real Amparo and expose the false Amparo. He later calls her, and she agrees to meet with him. When he arrives at the true Amparo's house, he gains some memories of his life as a tree. After recovering from this experience, he begins to speak with Amparo, whom he calls the True One. He hands her the manuscript and describes the False One to her, and she claims that the False One must be one of the Emissaries. She gives him the manuscript back and tells him to give it to the False One, which he has no intention of doing.

One morning, a hospital security guard arrives at the narrator's house. The narrator is taken to the office of the Director, who confronts him about his illegal trips to the archives. To his own confusion, the narrator confesses to this transgression and is taken to the infirmary. He is released and returns home after being questioned. He later begins to spy on himself and on others and notices that people do not fit into his expectations of them. The female workers and patients do not fit into his ideas of femininity. He continues to investigate Juan Escutia, and the Director catches him searching through the files again. The Director then confronts him about his guests, which are unacceptable by the hospital's standards. The narrator explains some of the circumstances of the arrival of the women and asks the Director if he wants to meet them. The Director accepts this invitation. When he arrives, the narrator is shocked to learn that the Director knows the “glu” language. He begins to converse with the women in this language, leaving the narrator confused.

The True One calls the narrator and tells him to come over, addressing him as a woman. The next morning, the False One breaks down and claims that without True Amparo's writing, her work is useless. She acknowledges that she is not the real Amparo, but she says that the one whom the narrator calls the True One is also false. The narrator decides to visit the True One, who seems to have forgotten inviting him. The True One asks why it even matters if she is the real Amparo and claims that she does not know whether she is or not. She then confuses the narrator by saying that "he" will kill himself without specifying who "he" is, and she claims that she is “the only one left.” The narrator then realizes that he is before the Disappearance. He remembers reading her manuscript but has no memories of its contents. He runs outside to his jeep, which has disappeared along with Amparo's manuscript. He then goes to walk along the coast before eventually being discovered by the Betrayed. She says something in the mysterious language, and the narrator understands her and responds.

The narrator ends up in the hospital and is released. Upon returning home, the False One greets him and tells him that they are the only ones left. The narrator goes down to the beach with False Amparo and she utters the same expression about "him" killing himself, and a pelican inexplicably commits suicide. False Amparo gets up to leave and encourages the narrator to accompany her, but he refuses.

Later, the narrator can no longer remember the False One's face, but he does remember the name of her hip bone: the Ilium. He thinks that the Emissaries should have realized that this is the best way to discover the sex of a person in order to discover his secret.

== Characters ==
- The Narrator - The unnamed narrator is a doctor at Serenity Shores Sanatorium and lives in employee housing on the oceanside. The narrator self-identifies as a male. According to Amparo Dávila he was a tree in a past life, which he can vaguely recall at various moments in the work. He is an older man, though still thin and toned, with gray hair, wrinkles, and green eyes. He describes himself as having problematic past relationships with women whom he either left quickly or quickly forgot about; he struggles between feelings of fear and feelings of desire in his interactions with women. The Betrayed and the Betrayer are two of his ex-lovers, and he had relations with a man (referred to as "Someone") in the early years of his adolescence. The narrator also has sexual relations with the Magpies. At the end of the novel he confesses to a secret, but the reader is not informed what the secret is.
- Amparo Dávila, the False One - Amparo has a catlike face with enormous eyes, finely arched eyebrows, high cheekbones, a wild mane of hair, and prominent hip bones, and she appears not much older than twenty-five. She incites feelings of fear in the narrator, although he initially confuses these feelings with desire. She is a feminist who seeks to preserve the words of the real Amparo Dávila, and she has found the narrator in hopes of obtaining a manuscript from the record of Juan Escutia at the hospital. She informs the narrator that she knows he is a woman and claims to have known him from the days when he was a tree. She acts as if she is the real Amparo Dávila and becomes upset when she learns the narrator has spoken with the True One. Every day, she wakes up, takes a shower, and makes breakfast. She sleeps in the same room as the Betrayed and cares for the Betrayed during her illness. Amparo and the Betrayed share a secret language.
- The Betrayed - The Betrayed is the narrator's ex-lover whose visit he expects on the night Amparo Dávila arrives at his doorstep. For a large amount of the first half of the book, the Betrayed is ill and Amparo is caring for her. The Betrayed and Amparo develop a secret language and grow close during the time they are staying in the narrator's house. The narrator can not get over the Betrayed. Their relationship began by only meeting on Thursdays, eventually changing into seeing each other every day, which lead to the narrator cheating with the Betrayer. Eventually, they mend their relationship, but the narrator fears he will betray her again; subsequently, he moves to the coast to start his job at the sanatorium without telling the Betrayed he has left. The Betrayed has some form of relationship with the General Director.
- Juan Escutia - Juan is a former patient of the Serenity Shores Sanatorium from the first few years of the narrator's tenure there; he was also called the Impetuous Man and the new/modern Prometheus because he incited protests among the terminally ill patients and encouraged them to rise up against the doctors. Before his time in various facilities, Juan lived in South City and was primarily a journalist. Juan was described as being muscular with brown eyes and a scruffy beard. One day, he used a mallet to smash a window at the sanatorium and killed himself by jumping out of the window.
- Amparo Dávila, the True One - The narrator refers to this Amparo as the True One. He meets with her to exchange the manuscript, hoping to gain answers about the False Amparo. Instead, the meeting with the True Amparo causes him to recall more memories of his time as a tree, and the strangeness surrounding his meetings with the True Amparo causes his sanity to unravel as the novel progresses. She is described as looking approximately the same as the False Amparo, albeit older. She informs the narrator about the emissaries, including the False Amparo.
- The Director - He is the General Director at the Serenity Shores Sanatorium who is forced to investigate the narrator after the narrator is found to be reading past records that he is not allowed access to and harboring women in his home. The General Director drinks nice whiskey—according to the narrator's tastebuds—and smokes cigars. He visits the narrator's house and speaks the secret language of the two women, and he has some sort of relationship with the Betrayed as she visits him at the hospital every day.
- The Betrayer - The Betrayer is an ex-lover of the narrator whom he still desires. She flirts with him flippantly one day when they meet in a coffee shop, and they share a kiss that consumes the narrator with a passion that lasts for three years. She threatens the narrator, throws plates at him, cries excessively, and argues endlessly. She leaves the narrator in search of something new, whereupon he realizes he dedicated all his energy, time, and space to her.
- The Magpies - The Magpies are two women who work with the narrator, although in the records department. He agrees to drive them to a party in return for access to the records, especially those of Juan Escutia. They live in one of the hospital-assigned apartments. They wear garish makeup and outdated glasses. On the night they meet with the narrator, they wear dressy clothes as they are going to their nephew's wedding. The narrator fantasizes about them in the car, and they ultimately engage in a threesome at the end of the evening.

== Development ==
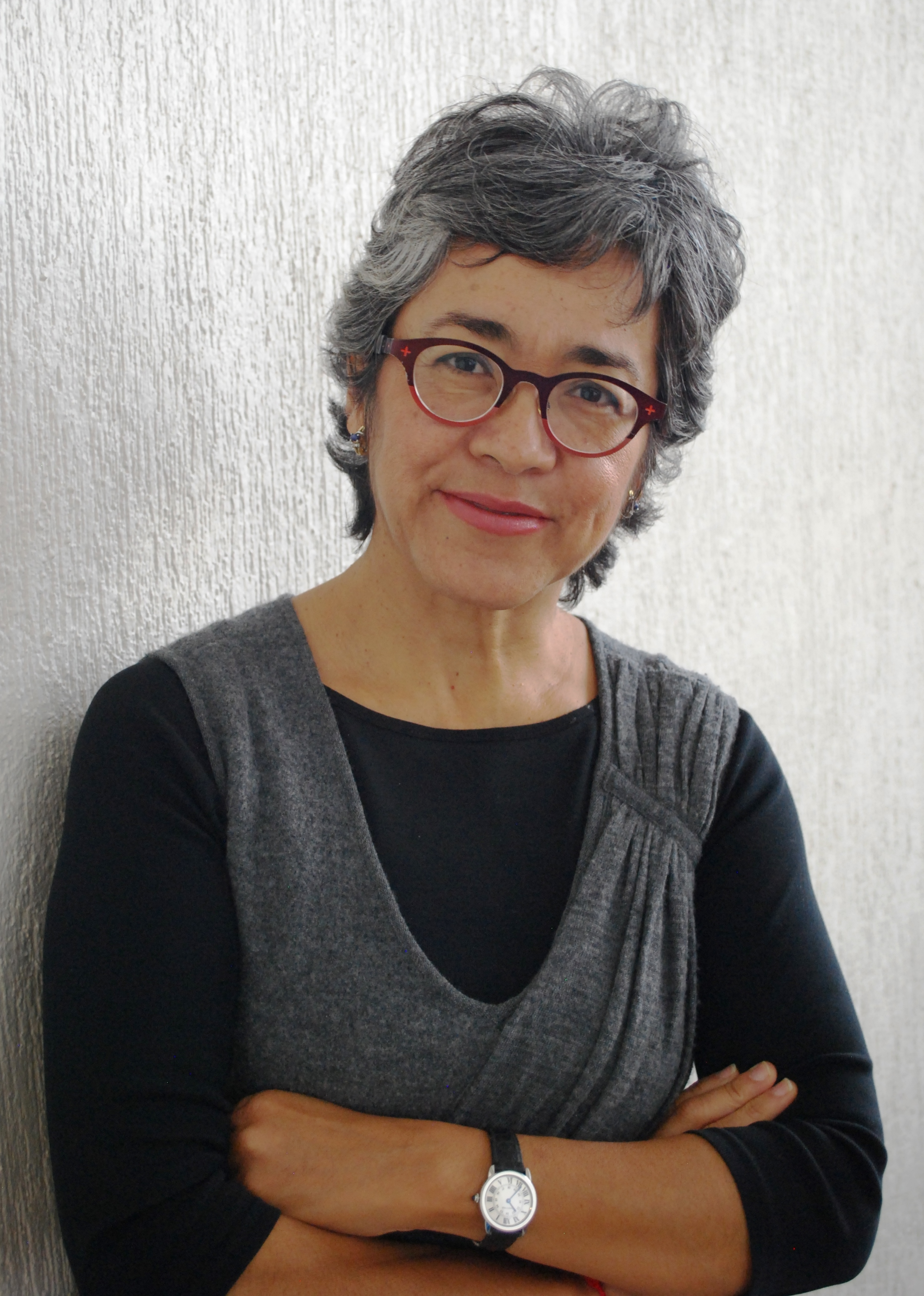
Cristina Rivera Garza, the author of The Iliac Crest.

Cristina Rivera Garza is currently a professor of writing at the University of California at San Diego, and she received her PhD from the University of Houston. Rivera Garza stated in an interview that she spent years analyzing the files of a large insane asylum in preparation for her earlier novel No One Will See Me Cry, and this studying lead to her use of language to show the dichotomy between insanity and sanity demonstrated in The Iliac Crest. She said that a major reason for writing the novel was to explore and question the boundaries and categories into which humans divide themselves. Rivera Garza stated in another interview that "writing should attempt to cross borders of genre and language while also highlighting the politics of borders between cities, genders, and definitions of sanity." In The Iliac Crest, Rivera Garza goes beyond whether someone is a man or a woman and instead focuses on how gender can be determined and why it's important.

A unique feature of The Iliac Crest is its inclusion of Amparo Dávila, a real life writer. Rivera Garza stated that Amparo Dávila's short story "The Guest" convinced Rivera Garza to make Dávila a character in her novel. Dávila's writing is described as ambiguous and unsettling, which allows the character to fit in with Rivera Garza's questioning of the status quo.

== Translation ==
The Iliac Crest was translated into English by Sarah Booker in 2017. Booker is a PhD student at University of North Carolina at Chapel Hill. She translates Spanish and Portuguese books to English. She acknowledged some of the challenges that came with translating the novel to English and explained that a few details were more easily communicated in Spanish. She said in an interview that, as Spanish is a heavily gendered and English is not, some aspects of the gender themes were lost in translation. She noted that the other characters in the story frequently used feminine language to refer to and address the narrator, while the narrator used masculine language to describe himself.

The book was also translated into the Italian language in 2010 by translator R. Schenardi.

== Themes ==
- Ocean - The narrator frequently looks towards the ocean to calm himself. In fact, multiple characters look towards the ocean for their freedom while being constrained inside. The ocean introduces the idea of borders and finality to the book. In this sense, some reviewers have considered the ocean a character in its own right. The ocean also represents the narrator's urge to give up the need for control, as he says the ocean is where he can "stop believing in reality".
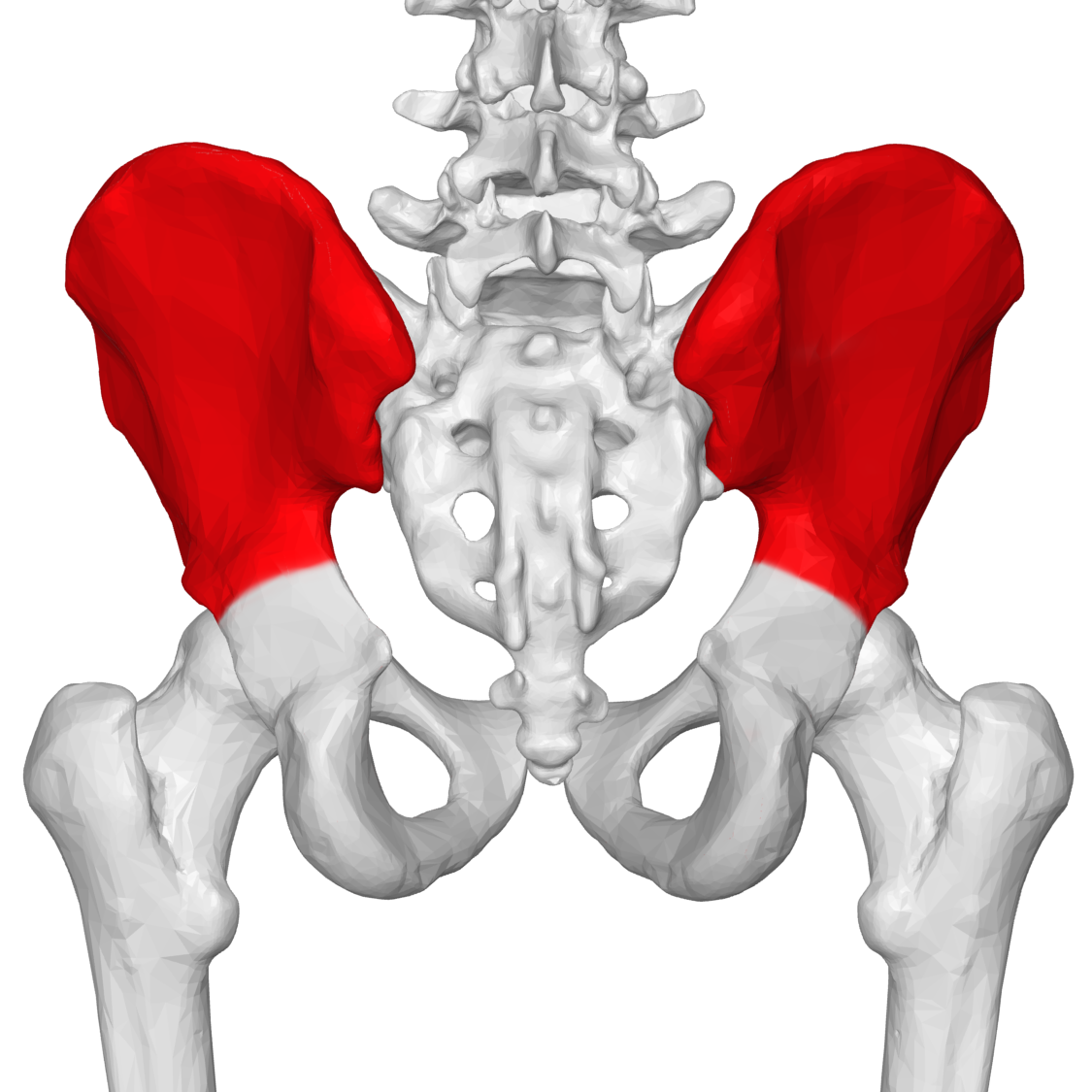
- The ilium
  Iliac Crest and Gender Binary - The iliac crest—also called the ilium or hip bones—is a portion of the pelvic region that can provide insight as to one's age or gender. In this novel, the narrator focuses heavily on the hip bones of the False One. At the end of the novel, he states that if the women had paid attention to his hip bones, they would have guessed his secret. This all leads into the themes of the gender binary prevalent throughout the novel. Multiple times, the narrator analyzes what makes a man a man and what makes a woman a woman, but he always returns to the hip bones, especially the prominent ones of the False One. Rivera Garza delves into why this gender binary is important and what exactly it is that divides the genders; this is ultimately the main commentary of the work.
- Secret Language - The false Amparo and the Betrayed (and eventually the General Director) communicate through a secret language heavily dependent on the syllable "glu". Rivera Garza said that this sound is supposed to mimic the sound of dripping water; she stated in an interview that "the liquid tonality of these letters and, especially, vowels, is central to it--convey both their intimacy and their complicity--can you have one without the other?" In this way, the secret language represents supposedly feminine qualities, such as intimacy and complicity, and the narrator is unable to understand this language until he experiences a new openness in gender identity. The sound of dripping water relates to the idea of the ocean theme; the narrator can understand the language once he gives himself the freedom to express his identity, effectively stopping his belief in the reality he knew.

== Reception ==
The Iliac Crest has been generally praised by reviewers. Rivera Garza's writing and storytelling has been described as "haunting and otherworldly" with a focus on the erasure of female writers. The novel was also praised for its psychological themes and explorations. Her analysis and criticism of binaries throughout the novel drew notice and praise from reviewers as well. The novel also drew support for its intriguing plot and clever incorporation of Amparo Dávila and the themes from her work into the story.

The Iliac Crest was the runner-up for the Rómulo Gallegos Iberoamerican Award in 2003.
