= Isako Isako =

2018 debut poetry collection by Mia Ayumi Malholtra

- Author: Mia Ayumi Malhotra
- Language: English
- Genre: Poetry
- Publisher: Alice James Books
- Publication date: September 4, 2018
- Pages: 100
- ISBN: 978-1-938584-94-7

Isako Isako is a 2018 debut poetry collection by Mia Ayumi Malhotra, published by Alice James Books. It won the 2017 Alice James Award.

== Background ==
The book is based on the experiences of Malhotra's grandmother, who lived in Japan during World War II and the subsequent American occupation before immigrating to the United States.

In a 2018 interview with Wildness, Malhotra said it took eight years to write, a period spanning the death of her grandmothers, the completion of her MFA, and the birth of two of her children. She specifically stated that her maternal grandmother's illness emboldened her to inherit and write about her family.

== Reception ==
Publishers Weekly described the book as "a chilling debut based on the linked lives of four generations of Japanese and Japanese-American women," lauding Malhotra for basing it in "documents and firsthand accounts of state-sanctioned terror."

The Japan Times described it as "a carefully controlled whirlwind of ideas and impressions" that demonstrates how trauma and violence can reverberate across generations.

Ingrid Rojas Contreras, in KQED, called it "heartrending" and commended how Malholtra handled different voices and perspectives which "echo each other and, finally, run aground into the same voice, the same story."

Hyphen called the collection a defense against the forces of "fascism and systemic racism."

RHINO Poetry noted that the collection's pantoums, persona poems, and prose poems are "deceptively quiet" interrogations of the past's effects on the present.

The Mercury News described it as weaving together the lives of generations of Asian American women into poetry.
