= Chloe Cooper Jones =

American journalist, memoirist, and academic

- Born: Bangkok, Thailand
- Education: Emerson College (BA); University of Kansas (MA, PhD); City University of New York (PhD)
- Notable work: Easy Beauty

Chloé Cooper Jones is a Thailand-born American memoirist, academic, and journalist. Her work has appeared in publications including the New York Times, GQ, The Verge, VICE, Bookforum, New York Magazine and The Believer.

== Biography ==
Jones was born in Bangkok, Thailand, and grew up in Tonganoxie and Lawrence, Kansas. She earned a bachelor's degree at Emerson College and a master's degree and doctorate from the University of Kansas. She was awarded a second PhD at City University of New York Graduate Center.

In 2020, Jones was a finalist for the Pulitzer Prize in feature writing for her profile of Ramsey Orta, the man who filmed the NYPD's killing of Eric Garner. The profile appeared in The Verge. She is also the recipient of the 2020 Whiting Foundation Creative Nonfiction Grant, and a 2021 Howard Foundation Grant from Brown University, both for Easy Beauty.

She was born with sacral agenesis, a congenital disorder that impacts her walk and shortens her stature. Jones' memoir, Easy Beauty, which is about her quest to both understand beauty and to challenge our assumptions and standards of it, was published by Avid Reader/Simon & Schuster in April 2022. A review in Ms.Magazine described Easy Beauty as "a memoir of motherhood and disability, of bodily presence and difference depicted by talent that is both staggering and undeniable." It was named a best book of the year by publications including The Washington Post, the Los Angeles Times, USA Today, Time, Publishers Weekly, Booklist and The New York Times. Jones was a finalist for the 2023 Pulitzer Prize for Memoir or Autobiography.
