= Antonio Vega (singer) =

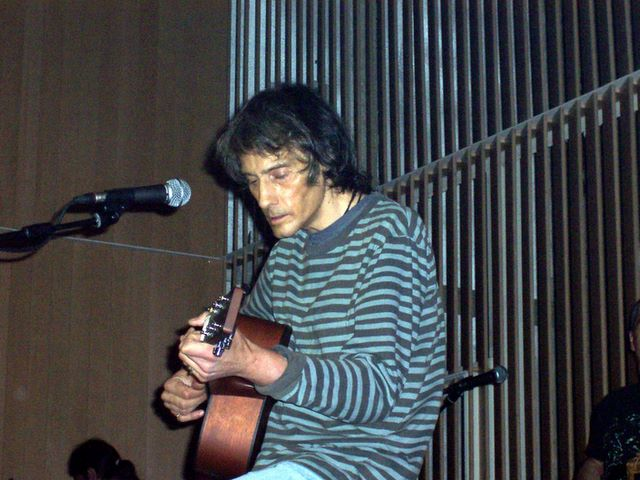
- Antonio Vega performing

Background information
- Born: Antonio Vega Tallés; 16 December 1957
- Died: 12 May 2009 (aged 51) Madrid, Spain
- Genres: Alternative rock; indie pop; indie rock
- Instruments: Guitar; vocals

Antonio Vega Tallés (a.k.a. Antonio Vega) (16 December 1957 – 12 May 2009) was a Spanish pop singer-songwriter.

== Biography ==
He was born in Madrid. In a psychologist test he scored 168 IQ. He studied at the Liceo Francés de Madrid, where he acted for the first time at aged 14.

Antonio Vega has been considered one of the fundamental composers of Spanish pop since the beginning of democracy. The intimacy of his songs and his sensitivity earned him admiration both from public and critics.

He was addicted to drugs since the 80s, which over time ceased to be a secret from the public.

On 20 April 2009 Antonio Vega was admitted to the Hospital Puerta de Hierro in Madrid with severe pneumonia that forced him to suspend his tour. He died on 12 May 2009, as a result of lung cancer that had been diagnosed 10 months earlier.

== Career ==
In 1978 he formed the band Nacha Pop out of another band, Uhu-Helicopter. In 1980, Nacha Pop released their debut album. The band broke up in 1988 and Antonio began a solo career.

== Discography ==
=== Solo career ===
- Studio Albums
  - 1991 – No me iré mañana
  - 1994 – Océano de sol

        Elixir de Juventud
        Vapor with Nacho Vejar
        Palabras
        Lleno de Papel
        Hablando de Ellos
        El Sitio de mi Recreo
        Ahora se que mis Amigos
        Cierto para Imaginar
        Palabras (Instrumental)
        Written and Arranged by Antonio

  - 1998 – Anatomía de una ola

        La Hora del Precuspulo
        Como la Lluvia al Sol
        Tuve que Correr with Nacho Vejar
        Murmullo de tus Manos
        Tributo a ...
        Mi Hogar en Cualquier Sitio
        Angel Caido
        Agua de Rio with Nacho Vejar + Music by Basilio Marti
        Entre Tu y Yo
        Anatomia de Una Ola
        Written by Antonio and Arranged by Antonio, Basilio Marti and Joan Babiloni

  - 2001 – De un lugar perdido

        Estaciones with Marga del Rio
        A Medio Camino
        Hojas que Arranque with Marga del Rio
        Para Bien y Para Mal
        Seda y Hierro
        De Un Lugar Perdido
        Ser un Chaval with Marga del Rio
        A Trabajos Forzados with Antonio Gala
        Horizons
        Written by Antonio

  - 2005 – 3000 noches con Marga
- Live Albums
  - 2002 – Básico (Madrid concert in El Círculo de Bellas Artes)
- Compilations
  - 1992 – El sitio de mi recreo (Best ballads compilation)
  - 1993 – Ese chico triste y solitario (Tribute by various artists)
  - 2004 – Escapadas (Album of collaborations)

=== With Nacha Pop ===
- Studio Albums
  - 1980 – Nacha Pop
  - 1982 – Buena disposición
  - 1983 – Más números, otras letras
  - 1984 – Una décima de segundo
  - 1985 – Dibujos animados
  - 1987 – El momento
- Live Albums
  - 1988 – Nacha Pop 1980–1988 (Live Album)
  - 2008 – Tour 80-08 Reiniciando (2 CDs + DVD. Live recording)

=== With Un Mar al Sur ===
- 2008 – Un sueño compartido

=== With Marta Sánchez ===
Marta Sánchez album De Par en Par

- 2010 – Escrito Sobre el Viento
