= Autobiography of Cotton =

Non-fiction book by Mexican writer Cristina Rivera Garza

- Author: Cristina Rivera Garza
- Original title: Autobiografía del algodón
- Translator: Christina MacSweeney
- Language: Spanish
- Genre: Non-fiction, Autobiography, Social history
- Publisher: Graywolf Press
- Publication date: February 3, 2026
- Publication place: Mexico
- Media type: Print (Hardcover), E-book, Audiobook
- Pages: 288

Autobiography of Cotton (original Spanish title: Autobiografía del algodón) is a non-fiction book by Mexican writer Cristina Rivera Garza. It was first published in Spanish in August 2020, with the English translation following in February 2026. The work blends elements of autobiography, family history, and social history to trace the author's ancestral roots in the cotton-growing regions of Northern Mexico and the Southern United States.

== Synopsis ==
The book is not a conventional autobiography. Rivera Garza constructs a narrative by piecing together fragments of family lore, archival documents, historical records, and personal reflection. Its central focus is the migration story of her paternal grandfather, Juan Francisco Rivera, who left the Mexican state of San Luis Potosí in the early 20th century to work in the cotton fields of the Laguna Region in Coahuila and later in Texas.

The narrative follows the geographic and economic path of cotton cultivation, exploring how this crop shaped the landscapes, labor systems, and communities of the border region. Rivera Garza investigates the conditions of life for the agricultural workers, known as campesinos, within the broader context of the cotton industry's development.

== Style and genre ==
Critics have noted the book's hybrid nature, situating it between autobiographical essay, historical investigation, and literary narrative. Rivera Garza employs a fragmented, non-linear structure, reflecting the pieced-together nature of recovered memory. The prose has been described as precise and poetic, intertwining personal reflection with documentary evidence.

== Publication and reception ==
Autobiografía del algodón was first published by Penguin Random House in Mexico City on August 21, 2020. Autobiography of Cotton, the English translation by Christina MacSweeney, was published in English by Graywolf Press on February 3, 2026.

An early review in the Boston Globe described the book as "a quiet, meticulous act of recovery" and noted its "spare, patient prose". The review stated that Rivera Garza "avoids grand pronouncements, instead allowing the accumulation of detail... to convey the weight of history". In a starred review, Kirkus Reviews called the novel "a masterful blend of genres from a shining light of Mexican literature." Publishers Weekly also praised the novel, noting simply "it’s not to be missed."

== Adaptations ==
An adaptation for the theater by Felipe Villarreal is set to play at Mexico City's Teatro Helénico in February 2026.
