= Stay True (memoir) =

2022 book by Hua Hsu

Stay True: A Memoir
- Author: Hua Hsu
- Language: English
- Publisher: Anchor Books
- Publication date: 2022
- Publication place: United States
- Pages: 208
- ISBN: 9780593315200

Stay True is a 2022 memoir by Hua Hsu, published by Anchor Books and Doubleday, both imprints of Penguin Random House. The memoir depicts Hsu's unlikely relationship with a college friend named Ken, a friendship that was unexpectedly and tragically cut short when Ken was killed in a carjacking in 1998.

The book received the 2023 Pulitzer Prize for Memoir or Autobiography as well as the 2022 National Book Critics Circle award for memoir and autobiography.

== Narrative ==
The memoir tells of what was an unlikely friendship that nonetheless formed and led to mutual understanding. During his undergraduate years at Berkeley, Hsu shunned mainstream culture. He judged others for their basic choices in music and fashion, and took pride in being part of what he believed was counterculture. He would stay at home on Friday nights and read or listen to music, believing that other people had little to offer him intellectually. Hsu did not drink, as he stated: "I couldn't imagine letting down my inhibitions around people I'd be silently judging the whole time."

He met Ken in the mid-1990s, when Ken lived in the dorm room above Hsu's at Berkeley. At first, Hsu was not intrigued by Ken, considering him too mainstream and uncool. Ken listened to the Dave Matthews Band and wore Abercrombie & Fitch clothing, all of which Hsu found unappealing and pedestrian. The two, despite both being Asian-American, also came from different backgrounds. Hsu was a first generation son of Taiwanese immigrants. Ken was Japanese-American, and his family had been in the United States for generations, already (as Hsu believed) seamlessly integrated into American society. Ken was part of a fraternity, he had a white girlfriend, he was more sociable than Hsu, and he was more open to society around him. This initially brought displeasure from Hsu, who had a greater attachment to his Taiwanese traditions.

However, the two eventually developed a close friendship, often staying up late to discuss music or culture. Other times, the conversations turned toward the marginalization of Asians in American culture. Ken told Hsu about the time a casting agent from the reality show The Real World visited his fraternity, and he asked her why, for a show that is interested in portraying diversity, has there never been an Asian person featured. Ken stated that the casting director responded that they "don’t have the personalities for it". Other times the two would try to list Asian characters on TV shows, with the resulting small lists consisting of minor or inconsequential roles. At the time, Hsu found making the list an exercise in futility, stating "we were just goofing off and passing time", but Ken thought more deeply of their conversations. Later, Hsu stated Ken was "piecing together a theory of the world".

Eventually, the two men from disparate backgrounds and vastly contrasting interests formed a close friendship. This friendship would be unexpectedly and tragically cut short less than three years later, in 1998, when Ken was killed in a carjacking. Hsu struggled to make sense of his close friend's death. Despite being close to his parents, he found little solace from them. Ultimately, Hsu gained a sense of closure from their friendship, using his experiences with Ken to inform his later life and career.

== Reception ==
In 2024, the memoir was ranked #58 in the New York Times list of the best 100 books of the 21st century.

Writing for The New York Times, critic Jennifer Szalai found that the book was expansive and difficult to categorize, stating: "To say that this book is about grief or coming-of-age doesn’t quite do it justice; nor is it mainly about being Asian American, even though there are glimmers of that too. Hsu captures the past by conveying both its mood and specificity." Szalai further stated: "This is a memoir that gathers power through accretion — all those moments and gestures that constitute experience, the bits and pieces that coalesce into a life."

Writing for The Guardian, writer Dina Nayeri acknowledged Hsu's concern that it is difficult to write about a deceased friend, especially after knowing him for such a brief period of time. With Hsu concerned that in eulogy, the author may be "burnishing his emotional credentials rather than offering a true account of the deceased”, but Nayeri stated that Hsu provided a touching account of his friend. And she stated of the writing: "These meditations give the writing grace and depth. It’s not enough to classify Stay True as a friendship memoir, or a coming-of-age story, a tale of immigration and assimilation, or a philosophical reflection. It is all these things and more, wrapped up in a meticulous rendering of a 90s California adolescence..."

Writing for The Washington Post, Charles Arrowsmith stated: "For all the soul-searching, therapeutic work and years of rumination imprinted on "Stay True", it's the ache of a friendship lost but honored that will linger for readers."
