= Pulitzer Prize for Opinion Writing =

American journalism award

The Pulitzer Prize for Opinion Writing is one of the Pulitzer Prizes for American journalism. It recognizes distinguished opinion journalism writing. It was awarded for the first time in 2026, and is a successor to the previous categories recognizing Editorial Writing and Commentary.

== Winners and citations ==
Year	Name(s)	Publication	Rationale
2026	M. Gessen	The New York Times	"for an illuminating collection of reported essays on rising authoritarian regimes that draw on history and personal experience to probe timely themes of oppression, belonging and exile."
2026	Gustavo Arellano	Los Angeles Times	"for passionate, vivid commentary on the cruelty endured by families and communities in the Los Angeles area targeted by federal mass deportation policy."
2026	Nicholas Kristof	The New York Times	"for a wrenching and impactful series of columns imploring Americans to face the deadly consequences of the Trump administration's cuts to the U.S. Agency for International Development."
