= Hua Hsu =

American writer and academic (born 1977)

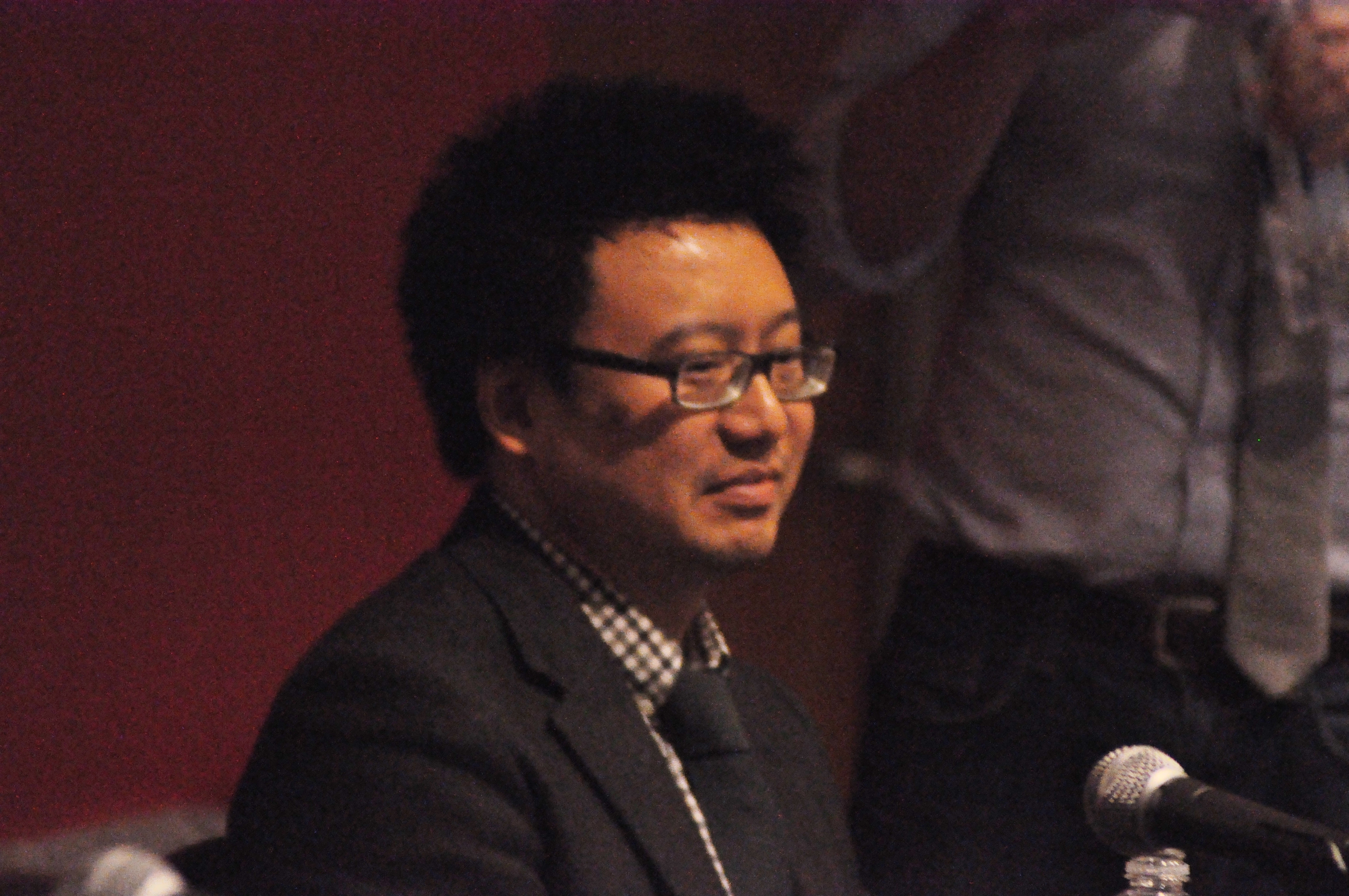
- Hsu in 2010
- Born: 1977 (age 48–49); Champaign–Urbana, Illinois, U.S.
- Education: University of California, Berkeley (BA); Harvard University (PhD)
- Occupations: Professor, writer
- Employer(s): Bard College; The New Yorker
- Notable work: Stay True (2022)
- Awards: Pulitzer Prize for Memoir or Autobiography (2023)

Hua Hsu (born 1977) is an American writer and academic, based in New York City. He is a professor of English at Bard College and a staff writer at The New Yorker. His work includes investigations of immigrant culture in the United States, as well as public perceptions of diversity and multiculturalism. He is the author of A Floating Chinaman: Fantasy and Failure Across the Pacific. His second book, Stay True: A Memoir, was published in September 2022.

== Early life and education ==
Hsu was born in 1977 to a Taiwanese American family in Champaign-Urbana, Illinois. He moved with his family to Plano, Texas, and then Richardson, Texas. They later moved to southern California, then ultimately Cupertino, where his father was an engineer; his mother stayed at home with Hua. The family lived in Cupertino from about the time Hsu was 9 to 18, though his father moved to Taiwan to pursue work and Hsu often spent summers and other school vacations there.

Hsu attended college at the University of California, Berkeley, where he studied political science. He graduated with a Bachelor of Arts in 1999. He then pursued doctoral studies at Harvard University to study Asian American literature, earning a PhD in the American history in 2008. His doctoral dissertation was titled, "Pacific Crossings: China, the United States, and Transpacific Imagination". His doctoral advisor was the essayist Louis Menand.

== Career ==
Hsu was a tenured associate professor of English and director of American Studies at Vassar College until 2022, when he became professor of English at Bard College. Since 2017, he has also been a staff writer at The New Yorker. His work includes investigations of immigrant culture in the United States, as well as public perceptions of diversity and multiculturalism. Other research work and interests include studies of literary history and arts criticism.

Hsu has been a fellow at New America, a public policy think tank and a contributor to The New Yorker, The Atlantic, Slate, and The Wire. His 2012 essay for Lucky Peach about suburban Chinatowns was nominated for a 2012 James Beard Award for food writing. He is a board member of the Asian American Writers' Workshop. His book, A Floating Chinaman: Fantasy and Failure Across the Pacific, was published in June 2016 by Harvard University Press. He was a 2016 National Fellow for the New America Foundation.

Hsu's second book, Stay True: A Memoir, about an important friendship he had while in college, was published by Doubleday on September 27, 2022. It received a starred review in Publishers Weekly. Jennifer Szalai of The New York Times wrote, "Hsu is a subtle writer, not a showy one; the joy of 'Stay True' sneaks up on you, and the wry jokes are threaded seamlessly throughout." The book was named one of the "10 Best Books of 2022" by The New York Times and The Washington Post. The book won the 2023 Pulitzer Prize for Memoir or Autobiography and the 2022 National Book Critics Circle Award for Memoir and Autobiography. In 2024, The New York Times Book Review ranked Stay True as the 58th best book of the 21st century.

== Personal life ==
Hsu lives in Brooklyn. He is married with a son.

== Bibliography ==
=== Books ===
- A Floating Chinaman: Fantasy and Failure Across the Pacific. Cambridge, Massachusetts: Harvard University Press. 2016.
- Stay True: A Memoir. New York: Doubleday. 2022.

=== Essays and reporting ===
- "The End of White America?". U.S. The Atlantic. January–February 2009.
- "All Hail the Chairmen: Jonathan Olivares's 'Taxonomy of Office Chairs'". Los Angeles Review of Books. April 18, 2012.
- "Michael K. Williams Reveals his Omar Mix". Vulture. September 5, 2012.
- "Wokking the Suburbs". Lucky Peach. December 13, 2012.
- "The Simpsons Go to China". Currency. The New Yorker. September 26, 2014. (Note: Available on website only.)
- "Before Gentrification, A City Covered in Graffiti". Cultural Comment. The New Yorker. October 16, 2014.
- "The Civility Wars". Cultural Comment. The New Yorker. December 1, 2014.
- "A God Dream: Kanye West Unveils a New Album, 'The Life of Pablo'". The Critics. Pop Music. The New Yorker. 92 (2): 66–68. February 22, 2016. (Note: Title in the online table of contents is "Kanye West realizes his dreams".)
- "The Struggle: Macklemore Wrestles with his Place in Hip-Hop". The Critics. Pop Music. The New Yorker. 92 (4): 70–71. March 7, 2016. (Note: Online version is titled "Mackelmore, the hip-hop villain".)
- "Pale Fire: Is Whiteness a Privilege or a Plight?". The Critics. A Critic at Large. The New Yorker. 92 (22): 63–66. July 25, 2016. (Note: Online version is titled "White plight?".)
- "The Critic Who Convinced Me That Criticism Could Be Art". The New Yorker. September 21, 2016.
- "Bon Iver's New Voice". The Critics. Pop Music. The New Yorker. October 3, 2016.
- "Listening to George Michael in Taiwan". Cultural Comment [web only]. The New Yorker. January 4, 2017.
- "Praise Songs: Alice Coltrane in Sanskrit". The Critics. Pop Music. The New Yorker. 93 (10): 98–99. April 24, 2017. (Note: Online version is titled "Alice Coltrane’s devotional music".)
- "Legacy media: Kendrick Lamar's Sense of Debt to Those who Came Before". The Critics. Pop Music. The New Yorker. 93 (11): 74–75. May 1, 2017. (Note: Online version is titled "Kendrick Lamar's holy spirit".)
- "Rostam Batmanglij Defines his Musical Identity". Pop Music. The New Yorker. September 18, 2017.
- "Forward March: Bjõrk's Visions of the Future". The Critics. Pop Music. The New Yorker. 93 (39): 62–64. December 4, 2017. (Note: Online version is titled "Bjõrk's visions of an enchanted future".)
- "Machine Yearning: Holly Herndon's Search for a New Art Form for Our Tech Obsessions". The Critics. Pop Music. The New Yorker. 95 (13): 83–84. May 20, 2019. (Note: Online version is titled "Electronic pop for the surveillance era".)
- "Burial's Search for Fleeting Moments". Pop Music. The New Yorker. December 9, 2019.
- "Exclude Me In: In the Seventies, a Group of Asian–American Writers Decided it was Their Turn". The Critics. Books. The New Yorker. 95 (43): 58–63. January 6, 2020. (Note: Online version is titled "The Asian-American Canon Breakers".)
- "The Musical Monk: Rediscovering Beverly Glenn-Copeland's Inward-Looking Sounds". The Critics. Pop Music. The New Yorker. 96 (28): 59–60. September 21, 2020. (Note: Online version is titled "Beverly Glenn-Copeland's music for a future that never came".)
- "Whims: Paul McCartney's Surprisingly Playful Pandemic Album". The Critics. Pop Music. The New Yorker. 96 (41): 80–81. December 21, 2020. (Note: Online version is titled "Paul McCartney's surprisingly playful pandemic album".)
- "Sound Design: The Obsessive Beat-Making of Madlib". The Critics. Pop Music. The New Yorker. 96 (45): 72–73. January 25, 2021. (Note: Online version is titled "The obsessive beat-making of Madlib".)
- "Game Over: How Athletes Began Telling a New Story About Sports". The Critics. Podcast Dept. The New Yorker. 97 (7): 63–65. April 5, 2021. (Note: Online version is titled "The Rise of the Athlete Podcaster".)
- "Listening Tour: Saint Etienne's Nostalgic, Time-Travelling Sounds". The Critics. Pop Music. The New Yorker. 97 (29): 78–79. September 20, 2021. (Note: Online version is titled "Saint Etienne's Nineties Nostalgia".)
- "My Dad and Kurt Cobain: Alternative Culture and a Fax Machine Bridged an Ocean". Personal History. The New Yorker. 98 (25): 24–29. August 22, 2022.
- "What Happens After A.I. Destroys College Writing?". Annals of Education. The New Yorker. June 30, 2025.

———————

== See also ==
- Chinese people in New York City
- New Yorkers in journalism
- Taiwanese people in New York City
- The Hanging on Union Square by H. T. Tsiang, whom Hsu refers to in A Floating Chinaman.
