= The Man Without a Face: The Unlikely Rise of Vladimir Putin =

2012 book by Masha Gessen

- First edition
- Author: Masha Gessen
- Language: English
- Subject: The rise and reign of Vladimir Putin
- Published: March 2012
- Publisher: Riverhead Books
- Publication place: United States
- Media type: Hardcover
- Pages: 342
- ISBN: 9781594488429
- Website: www.penguinrandomhouse.com

The Man Without a Face: The Unlikely Rise of Vladimir Putin is a 2012 book by Masha Gessen about Vladimir Putin and his rise to power and reign. Gessen's analysis of Putin is mostly speculative, but they carefully investigate his own revealing accounts of his life, and they use interviews with people who knew Putin, before he rose to power, to form their conclusions.

== Content ==
External videos
- Presentation by Gessen on The Man Without a Face, March 8, 2012, C-SPAN

The book describes Vladimir Putin's early life, including his relationship with his parents and his school life under a communist government. Gessen uses Putin's early years to show the reader how he was shaped into the man he became. The book covers controversies and wars Putin was involved in, such as the First Chechen War and contains stories about former Russian leader Boris Yeltsin. It goes on to explain the relationship between him and his wife. It then discusses controversies in the government and Putin's eventual rise to power in the Kremlin.

== Reviews and reception ==
The book sold well, but had mixed reviews. Many said Gessen had a biased view or there had been books about Putin that had been written better. CIA officer John Ehrman's review stated: "As a biography it is satisfactory, but no more than that" and "little of what Gessen has to say is new." He described their images as "effective as anti-Putin propaganda".

The book was shortlisted for the 2013 Pushkin House Russian Book Prize.

== See also ==
- Bibliography of Vladimir Putin
- Bibliography of Russian history (1991–present)
