= Ramsey Orta =

Filmed the killing of Eric Garner

- Born: 1991 or 1992; New York, New York, U.S.
- Known for: Filming the killing of Eric Garner.

Ramsey Orta is an American man who filmed the killing of Eric Garner in New York City on July 17, 2014. His video spurred protests and debate over city police procedure. Following a campaign of police harassment after the video went viral, Orta has expressed regret in filming the incident. In 2016, Orta was sentenced to four years in prison for weapons and drug charges after accepting a plea deal for which the prosecutor agreed to drop charges against his mother. He was released in May 2020.

== Imprisonment ==
Following his taping of Garner's death, Orta was arrested multiple times. He pled guilty to drug and gun charges in 2016 and received a four-year prison sentence. Orta was transferred multiple times during his imprisonment. He was last in solitary confinement in Collins Correctional Facility. Orta was released in May 2020 and was under court supervision until January 2022. A crowdfunding campaign raised over $200,000 for Orta.
