= Amparo Dávila =

Mexican writer (1928–2020)

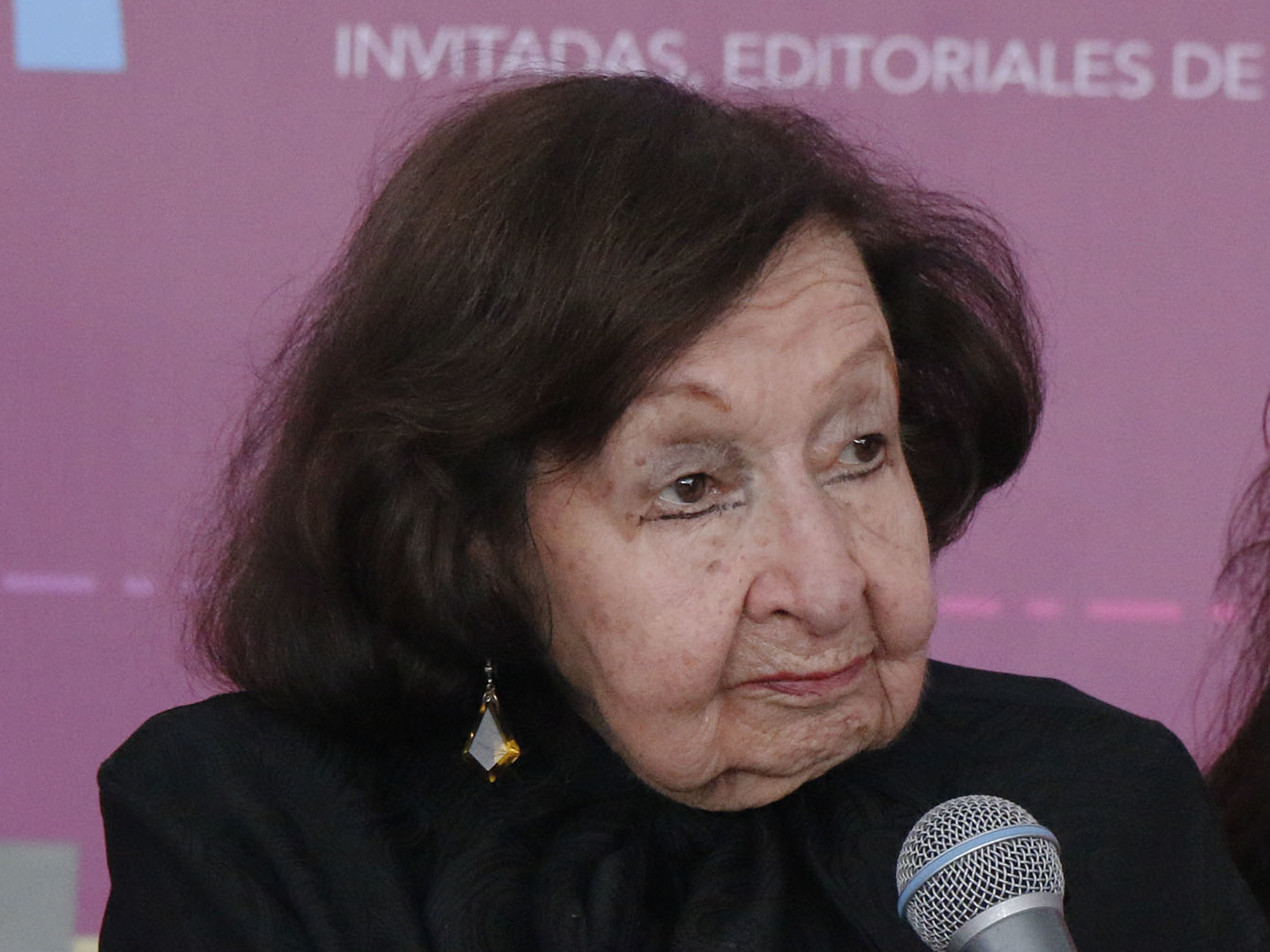
- Dávila in 2016
- Born: 21 February 1928; Pinos, Zacatecas, Mexico
- Died: 18 April 2020 (aged 92); Zacatecas, Mexico
- Occupation: Writer
- Notable work: Árboles petrificados (Petrified Trees) (1977), Tiempo destrozado (Broken Time) (1959)
- Awards: Premio Xavier Villaurrutia (1977), Medalla Bellas Artes (2015)

Amparo Dávila (21 February 1928 – 18 April 2020) was a Mexican writer best known for her short stories touching on the fantastic and the uncanny. She won the Xavier Villarrutia Award in 1977 for her short story collection, Árboles petrificados. In 2015, a literary prize in her honor was created in Mexico for the best story within the genre of "the fantastic": the Premio Bellas Artes del Cuento Fantástico Amparo Dávila.

== Biography ==
Dávila was born on February 21, 1928, in Pinos, Zacatecas. Her childhood was marked by fear, a theme that appeared in a number of her future works as an author. Her first published work was Salmos bajo la luna in 1950. This was followed by Meditaciones a la orilla del sueño and Perfil de soledades. In 1954 she moved to Mexico City where she worked as Alfonso Reyes's secretary. In 1966, she was a part of the Centro Mexicano de Escritores (Mexican Writers' Center) where she received a grant to continue writing. In 2008, Davila was recognized by the Palacio de Bellas Artes in Mexico City.

=== Death ===
Dávila died on 18 April 2020. Her death was announced by the Secretary of Culture of Zacatecas on April 18, 2020. In 2018, she wrote:

May I not die on a cold Winter day and leave shivering from cold and fear into the unknown that world of shades. Not like that. A faceless being walking endlessly by my side or that awaits around the corner. And that unfathomable mystery that we cannot uncover and that anguishes and disrupts existence. I want to leave in a sunny day of a green Spring full of sprouts and birds and flowers to look for my Garden of Eden, my lost paradise and enjoy the fruit of the vine and the fig tree, the perfume of the blossomed cherry and orange trees, the warmth of the sun that never sets.

== Work ==
Davila is known for her use of themes of insanity, danger, and death, typically dealing with a female protagonist. Many of her protagonists appear to have mental disorders and lash out, often violently, against others. Many times the women are still unable to escape from their mental issues and live with the actions they have taken. She also plays with ideas of time by using time as a symbol of that which we cannot change.

Her other works include:

- Salmos bajo la luna (1950)
- Meditaciones a la orilla del sueño (1954)
- Perfil de soledades (1954)
- Tiempo destrozado (1959)
- Música concreta (1964)
- Árboles petrificados (1977)
- Muerte en el bosque (1985)

== English Translations ==
- The Houseguest and Other Stories (New Directions, 2018) tr. Audrey Harris and Matthew Gleeson
