= Cristina Rivera Garza =

Mexican writer and professor (born 1964)

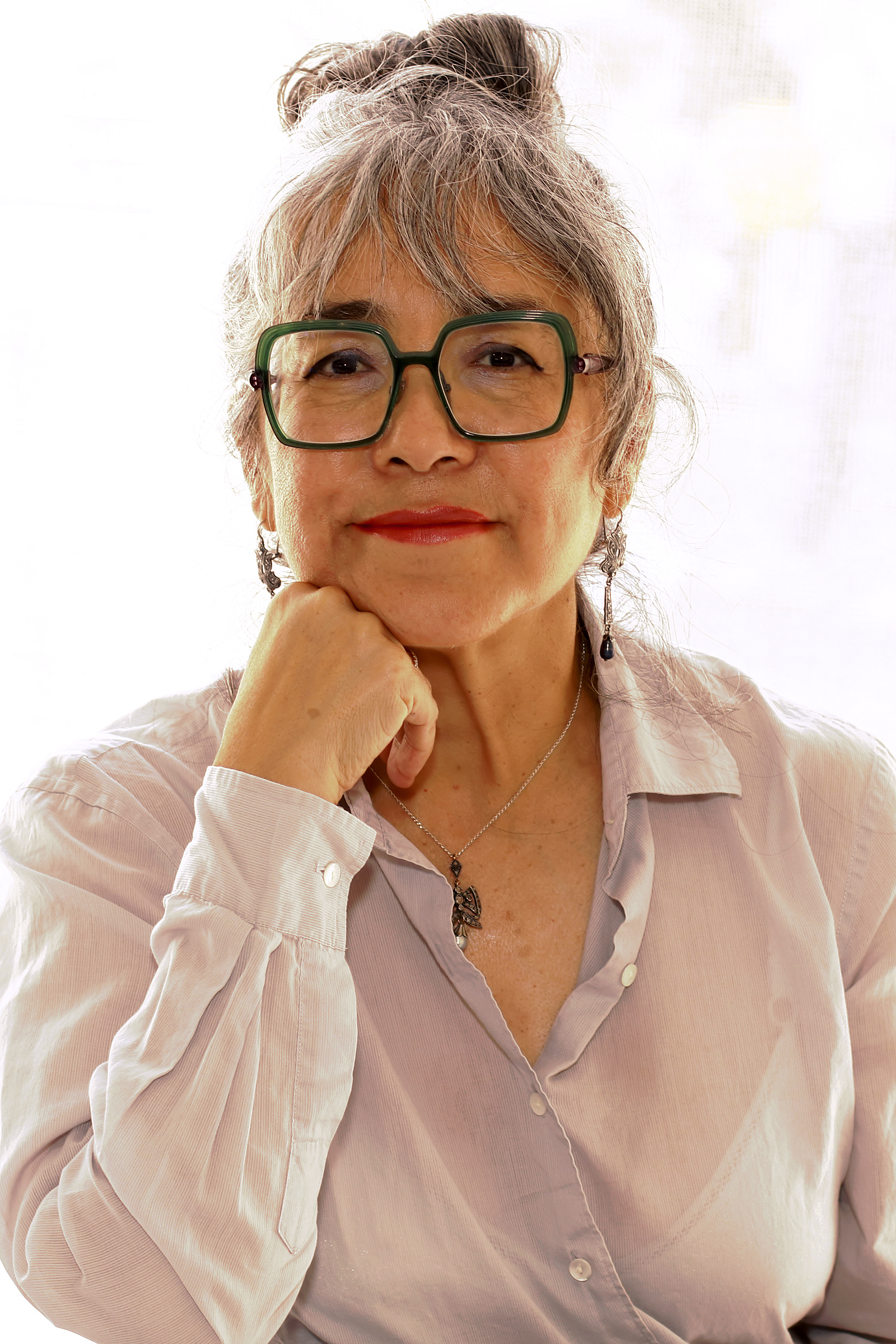
- Rivera Garza at the 2024 Texas Book Festival.
- Born: October 1, 1964 (age 62); Matamoros, Tamaulipas
- Education: National Autonomous University of Mexico
- Occupations: Writer; Professor
- Employer: University of Houston
- Writing career
- Language: Spanish; English
- Genres: Novels; Poetry; Short Stories
- Notable works: Liliana's Invincible Summer; Nadie me verá llorar
- Notable awards: Pulitzer Prize (2024); Sor Juana Inés de la Cruz Prize (2001) (2009); Anna Seghers Prize(2005)
- Website: cristinariveragarza.blogspot.mx

Cristina Rivera Garza (born October 1, 1964) is a Mexican author and professor known for her fiction and memoir. Multiple novels, including Nadie me verá llorar (No One Will See Me Cry), received Mexico's highest literary awards and international honors. Born in the state of Tamaulipas, near the Mexico–U.S. border, she is a teacher and a writer who has worked in both Mexico and the United States. She taught history and creative writing at various universities and institutions, including the National Autonomous University of Mexico (UNAM), Tec de Monterrey, Campus Toluca, and University of California, San Diego, but currently holds a position at the University of Houston. She received a MacArthur Fellowship in 2020, and other recent accolades include the Juan Vicente Melo National Short Story Award, the Sor Juana Inés de la Cruz Prize (Rivera Garza is one of two authors to win this award twice), and the Anna Seghers Prize.

Her 2023 memoir, Liliana's Invincible Summer, which documents her sister's life and her 1990 murder at the age of twenty by a boyfriend, was a finalist for the 2023 National Book Award for Nonfiction and won the Pulitzer Prize for Memoir or Autobiography. The book paints a portrait of her sister's life as well as investigating the causes of and society's response to intimate partner violence.

== Life ==
Rivera Garza was born on October 1, 1964, in Matamoros, Tamaulipas, in the northeast of Mexico on the border with the United States. She is fluent in English and Spanish and has had a desire to write since her teenage years.

She did her undergraduate studies in sociology at ENEP-Acatlán – part of the National Autonomous University of Mexico (UNAM) – then went on to study her master’s in Latin American history at UNAM. She holds a Ph.D. in History from the University of Houston (1995). Her doctoral thesis was on the subjection of the human body to state power in mental asylums in early 20th-century Mexico.

She has lived in various places in Mexico as well as in the United States, developing her teaching career on both sides of the border, living in Mexico City, Toluca, Houston, and San Diego. Rivera Garza spent some of her “decisive years” studying in Mexico City, which she says has given her a personal and intimate relationship with Mexico’s capital, featured in her novel Nadie me verá llorar. However, she never permanently moved to the capital, which is Mexico’s literary center, making her feel outside of the country’s literary scene. She has also stated that she does not like the concentration of Mexico’s culture in the capital.

While she declines to use words to describe herself, she does state that “I am me and my keyboard.” She states that her personality is not fixed, and such would be limiting. Rivera Garza maintains interests in narrative, history, and the nature of human language/communication. She believes that writing can be a question of life or death, and that writers should misbehave in real life as well as in the imagination to be connected to the world and better able to tell stories.

== Teaching career ==
Rivera Garza has always had a full-time job in teaching, which limits her time for creative writing, for which she is better known. Her first professorship was with San Diego State University from 1997 to 2004, teaching Mexican history. In 2001, CECUT/Centro Cultural de Tijuana invited her to teach a class in creative writing, which she says changed her "personal dynamics, a lot of my relationships with Mexico" being in a Spanish dominant academic environment again.

In 2004, she returned to Mexico as a professor of humanities at Tec de Monterrey, Toluca Campus, where she was co-director. In 2008, she returned to San Diego as a professor of creative writing at the literature department of the University of California, San Diego.

Rivera has also taught at UNAM, the Universidad Autónoma del Estado de México (UAEM), DePauw University, and has done research into popular conceptions of insanity and the history of psychiatry in Mexico. Her research work has appeared in journals such as Hispanic American Historical Review, the Journal of the History of Medicine and Allied Sciences, as well as journals in England and Argentina.

As of March 2026, Rivera is a M.D. Anderson Distinguished Professor in Hispanic Studies and the director and founder of the Creative Writing Program at the University of Houston. The Creative Writing Program is the first Ph. D. program in Creative Writing in Spanish in the United States.

== Writing career ==
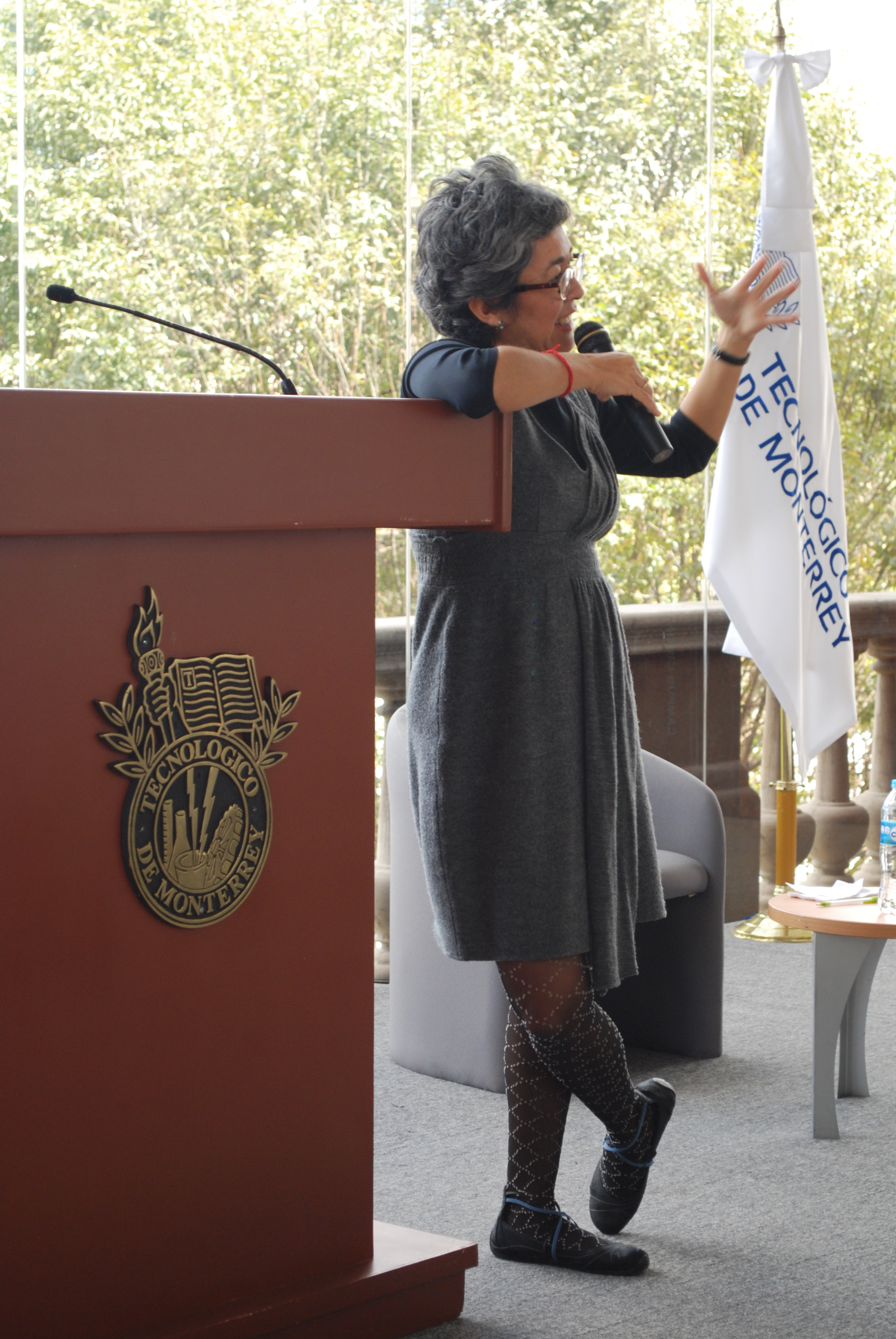
Rivera presenting the book El Mal de la Taiga at the Tec de Monterrey, Mexico City

Rivera Garza is one of the most prolific Mexican writers in her generation, receiving grants from CME (1984), FONCA (1994, 1999), and the Centro de Estudios México-Estados Unidos (1998). In addition to writing books, she has collaborated with publications such as El Cuento, El Sol de Toluca, Excélsior, La Guillotina, La Palabra y El Hombre, Macrópolis, Nacional, Punto de Partida, Revista de la UAEM and San Quintin.

Rivera has also explored the digital realm as a venue for the publication of creative works. This began with blogging, starting with a now defunct site called Blogsívela, a novel/blog written with the participation of readers. She has blogged since the late 1990s, with her current blog dating from 2004. However, instead of using her blog solely for promotional purposes, as most other writers do, Rivera Garza uses the resource to publish material that is more experimental and unconstrained by the requirements of traditional publishing. She has also experimented with Twitter (@criveragarza), with her tweets described as developing meta commentaries both on tweeting and on literature, stating: "Look at it this way: an article is three or four tweets surrounded by text." She coined the term "tweetnovel" (tuitnovela in Spanish) as a timeline written by the characters. Various people participate in the creative but there is someone responsible for the timeline.

== Philosophy and style ==
Rivera Garza’s works have been described as a "disturbing pleasure". As a writer, she aims to darken things and make readers suspicious, believing that "there is too much light and clarity in the world" as well as too much communication and messaging. She does not write to create stories, nor to express herself or convince her readers to her point of view. Instead, she believes she is producing a kind of reality, agreeing with poet Caridad Ascensio that books provide travel through a state of mind. She does not believe that the purpose of fiction is to inform, as there are other ways to do this, but rather she views writing as a physical manifestation of thinking. Rivera Garza believes that literature is one of the few ways people can explore the limits of human experience through language, stating that the books that have impacted her the most are those that made her think.

Most of her creative work is a hybrid of styles, genres, and elements. She mixes styles such as narrative, poetry, short story, and novel. She blends elements from her imagination, along with those of reality including historical documents and even included herself in one of her novels. Her work has often focused on those marginalized, such as insane people and prostitutes and challenges the idea that concepts such as sex, nation or narrative identity are stable. Several of her works are influenced by her experience on both sides of the border, primarily writing in Spanish, but she has written in English as well.

== Recognition ==
Rivera Garza is one of Mexico’s best-known writers, having won six of Mexico's highest literary awards. Jorge Volpi has named her his favorite writer. Her work, especially Nadie me verá llorar, has been praised by critics such as Carlos Fuentes, who stated that it has not received the attention it deserves.

Her work has earned her various forms of recognition, starting in the 1980s with the Punto de Partida Poetry Competition in 1984 for Apuntes and the San Luis Potosí National Short Story Prize in 1987 for La guerra no importa. In the 1990s, her first novel, Desconocer, was a finalist at the 1994 Juan Rulfo Prize.

In 2001, she won the Juan Vicente Melo National Short Story Award and was chosen as a member of the SNCA from 2003 to 2005.

Her first international award was the Anna Seghers Prize, awarded in Berlin in 2005.

Her most recognized work at the time was Nadie me verá llorar which received the 2000 IMPAC/CONARTE/ITESM National Award for Best Published Novel in Mexico, the Sor Juana Inés de la Cruz Prize in 2001, along with 1997 José Rubén Romero National Literary Award for Best Novel and was a finalist at the IMPAC Dublin International Prize. Carlos Fuentes called it "one of the most perturbing and beautiful novels ever written in Mexico".

She won the Sor Juana Inés de la Cruz Prize again in 2009 for La muerte me da – the only author at the time to win this award twice.

In 2012, Rivera Garza received an honorary doctorate in Humane Letters from the University of Houston.

She is also the recipient of the Roger Caillois Award for Latin American Literature (Paris, 2013).

In 2020, she was awarded a MacArthur "Genius" grant.

In December 2024, Rivera Garza was included on the BBC's 100 Women list.

She won the 2024 Pulitzer Prize for Memoir-Autobiography for her book El invencible verano de Liliana / Liliana's Invincible Summer.

In 2025, Rivera Garza was appointed Curator in Residence at the Berlin International Literature Festival.

=== List of awards ===
- José Rubén Romero National Book Award (1997)
- IMPAC-CONARTE-ITESM Award (1999)
- Sor Juana Inés de la Cruz Prize, for Nadie me verá llorar (2001)
- Rómulo Gallegos Iberoamerican Award runner-up for La cresta de Illón (2003)
- Anna Seghers Prize (2005)
- Sor Juana Inés de la Cruz Prize, for La muerte me da (2009)
- Roger Caillois Award for Latin American Literature (2013)
- Shirley Jackson Award for the English translation of El mal de la taiga (2018)
- Pulitzer Prize for Memoir-Autobiography, El invencible verano de Liliana / Liliana's Invincible Summer (2024)

== Publications ==
Rivera Garza’s work has been translated into English, Portuguese, German, Italian, and Korean.

=== Novels ===
- Nadie me verá llorar (Mexico City/Barcelona: Tusquets, 1999).
  - No One Will See me Cry, translated by Andrew Hurley, ed. NU Press, 2003.
  - Re-edition: Nadie me verá llorar (Mexico City: Tusquets, 2014).
- La cresta de Ilión (Mexico City/Barcelona: Tusquets, 2002).
  - Il segreto, translated by R. Schenardi, ed. Voland, 2010.
  - The Iliac Crest, translated by Sarah Booker, ed. Feminist press, 2017; And Other Stories, UK, 2018.
- Lo anterior (Mexico City: Tusquets, 2004).
- La muerte me da (Mexico City/Barcelona: Tusquets, 2007).
  - Death Takes Me, translated by Sarah Booker & Robin Myers, 2025
- Verde Shanghai (Mexico City: Tusquets, 2011).
- El mal de la taiga (Mexico City: Tusquets, 2012)
  - The Taiga Syndrome, translated by Suzanne Jill Levine and Aviva Kana (Dorothy, US, 2018; And Other Stories, UK, 2019).
- Autobiografía del algodón (Literatura Random House, 2020)
  - Autobiography of Cotton, translated by Christina MacSweeney, (Graywolf Press, 2026)

=== Short-story collections ===
- La guerra no importa (Mexico City: Mortiz, 1991). San Luis Potosí National Book Award, 1987.
- Ningún reloj cuenta esto (Mexico City: Tusquets, 2002). Juan Vicente Melo National Book Award, 2001.
- La frontera más distante (Mexico City/Barcelona: Tusquets, 2008).
- Allí te comerán las turicatas (Mexico City: La Caja de Cerillos Ediciones/DGP, 2013).

=== Opera ===
- Viaje - in collaboration with Javier Torres Maldonado, work commissioned by the Festival Internacional Cervantino.

=== Poetry ===
- La más mía (Mexico City: Tierra Adentro, 1998).
- Los textos del yo (Mexico City: Fondo de Cultura Económica, 2005).
- La muerte me da (Toluca: ITESM-Bonobos, 2007).
- El disco de Newton, diez ensayos sobre el color (Mexico City: Dirección de Literatura, UNAM, Bonobos, 2011).
- Viriditas (Guadalajara: Mantis/UANL, 2011).

=== Non-fiction ===
- La Castañeda. Narrativas dolientes desde el Manicomio General, 1910-1930 (Mexico City: Tusquets, 2010).
- Dolerse. Textos desde un país herido (Mexico City: Sur+, 2011).
- Los muertos indóciles. Necroescrituras y desapropiación (Mexico City: Tusquets, 2013).
- Liliana's Invincible Summer: A Sister's Search for Justice. 2023

=== As editor ===
- Romper el hielo: Novísimas escrituras al pie de un volcán (Toluca: ITESM-Bonobos, 2006).
- La novela según los novelistas (Mexico City: Fondo de Cultura Económica, 2007).
- Romper el hielo: Novísimas escrituras al pie de un volcán. El lugar (re) visitado (Mexico City: Feria del Libro, Secretaría de Cultura, GDF, 2007).
- Rigo es amor. Una rocola de dieciséis voces (Mexico City: Tusquets, 2013).

=== Translations ===
From Spanish into English:

- "Nine Mexican Poets Edited by Cristina Rivera-Garza," in New American Writing #31.

From English into Spanish:

- Notas sobre conceptualismos (Mexico City: Conaculta, 2013).
- "Por la niebla del nosotros" translation and introduction of Juliana Sphar, in Nexos.
- Translations of poems by Don Mee Choi, Edwin Torres, Juliana Sphar, Harryette Mullen, among others, included in Los muertos indóciles. Necroescrituras y desapropiación.
