= M. Gessen =

Russian-American journalist and activist

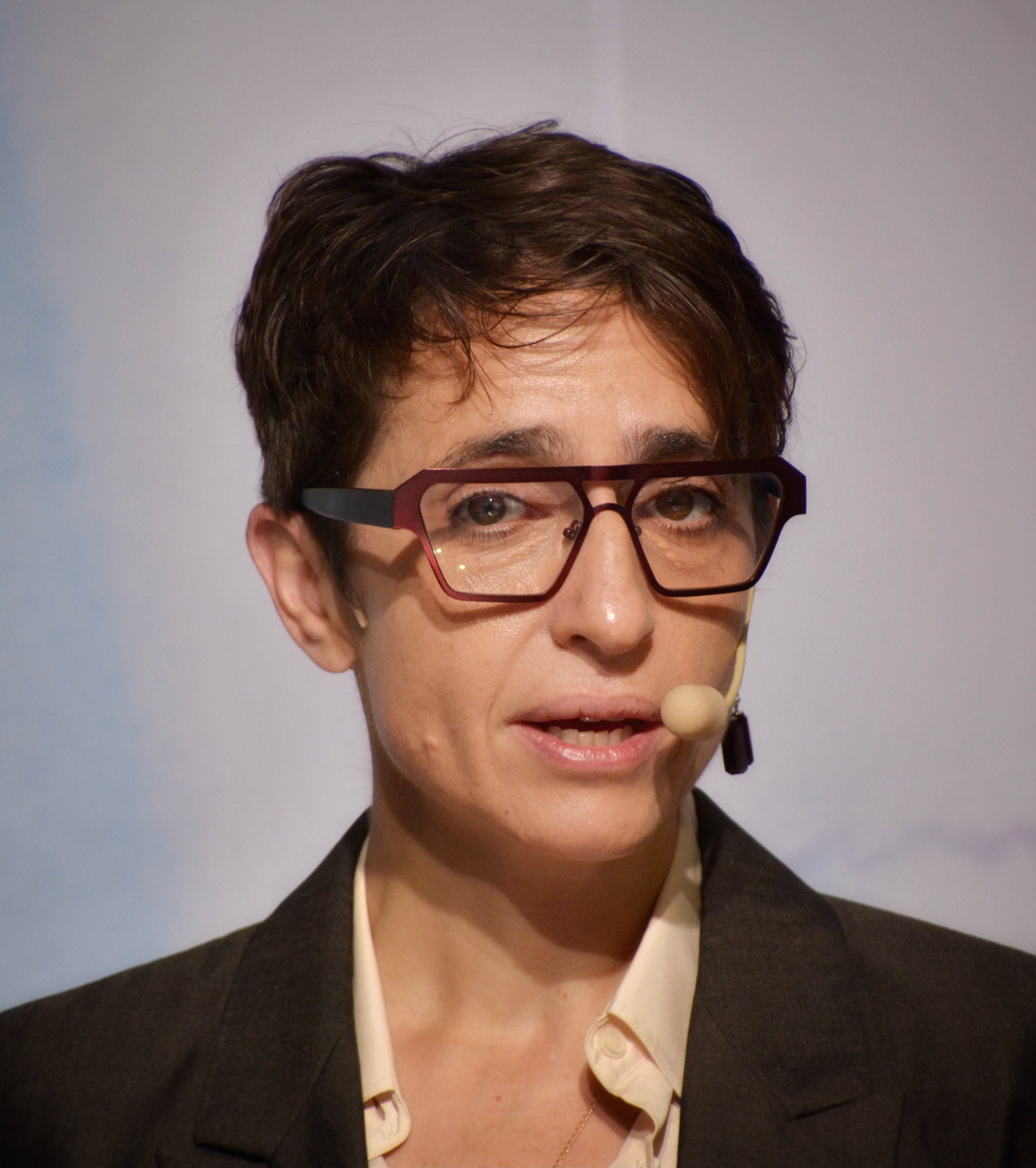
- Gessen in 2015
- Born: Mariya Aleksandrovna Gessen; 1967 (age 58–59); Moscow, Russian SFSR, Soviet Union (now Russian Federation)
- Citizenship: Russian; United States
- Occupations: Journalist; author; activist
- Spouse: Lynne Echenberg
- Children: 3
- Relatives: Keith Gessen (brother)
- Awards: Pulitzer Prize for Opinion Writing; National Book Award for Nonfiction; George Polk Award; Hannah Arendt Prize

M. Gessen (formerly known as Masha Gessen; Russian: Маша Гессен) is a Russian American journalist, author, and translator who has written extensively on LGBT rights and authoritarian regimes. Gessen received the 2026 Pulitzer Prize for Opinion Writing for their articles in The New York Times, which the Pulitzer committee called "an illuminating collection of reported essays on rising authoritarian regimes that draw on history and personal experience to probe timely themes of oppression, belonging and exile."

Gessen writes primarily in English but also in Russian. In addition to authoring more than 10 nonfiction books, Gessen has been an opinion columnist at The New York Times since May 2024 and was a staff writer at The New Yorker from 2017 to 2024. They have also contributed to The New York Review of Books, The Washington Post, the Los Angeles Times, The New Republic, New Statesman, Granta, Slate, Vanity Fair, Harper's Magazine, and U.S. News & World Report.

== Early life and education ==
Gessen was born into a Jewish family in Moscow in 1967 to Alexander and Yelena Gessen. Gessen's mother was a literary critic, and their father is a computer scientist specializing in forensics.

Gessen's paternal grandmother, Ester Goldberg, the daughter of a socialist mother and a Zionist father, was born in Białystok, Poland, in 1923 and emigrated to Moscow in 1940. Ester's father, Jakub Goldberg, died in 1943, in either the Białystok Ghetto or a Nazi concentration camp. As a Judenrat member, he was forced to assist the Nazis by, among other things, providing lists of Jews for deportation.

Gessen's maternal grandmother, Rosalia (Ruzya) Solodovnik, worked as a censor for the Stalinist government until she was fired during an antisemitic purge. Gessen's maternal grandfather, Samuil, was a committed Bolshevik who died during World War II, leaving Ruzya to raise Yelena alone.

In 1981, when Gessen was a teenager, their family moved via the Office of Refugee Resettlement to the US. As an adult in 1996, Gessen moved back to Moscow, where they worked as a journalist. They hold both Russian and US citizenship. Their brothers are Keith, Daniel, and Philip Gessen.

== Journalism career ==
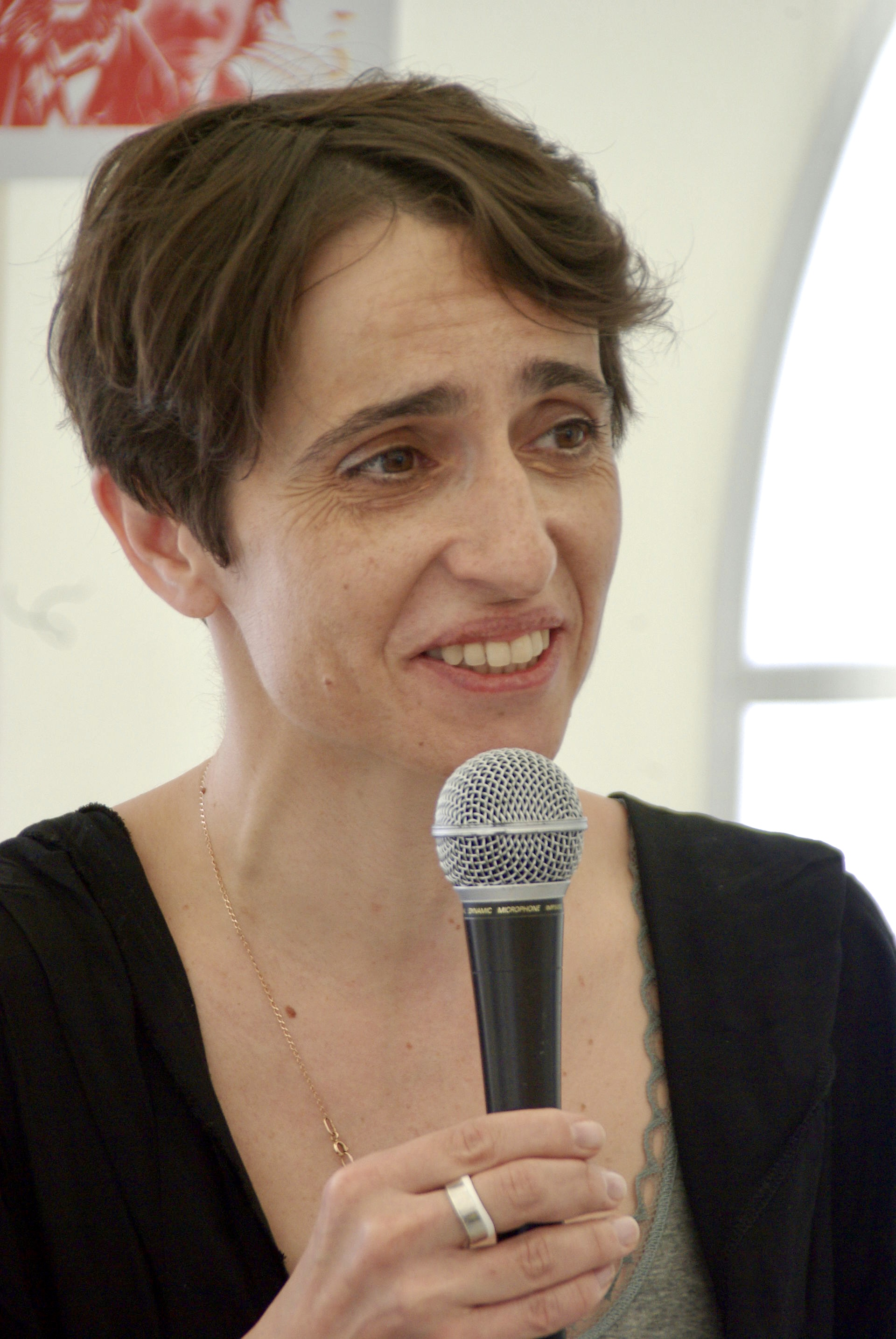
M. Gessen at the Moscow International Book Festival, 2011

Gessen was on the board of directors of the Moscow-based LGBT rights organization Triangle between 1993 and 1998 and has led gay rights demonstrations in Moscow.

Gessen served as a volunteer board member at PEN America for nine years, resigning in May 2023 after the organization withdrew an invitation to two exiled Russian authors to speak at the PEN World Voices event in the wake of a threatened boycott by the event's Ukrainian participants. Gessen was vice president of the board at the time and remains a member of PEN America.

Gessen said they understood Ukrainian authors' feelings but did not approve of how PEN handled the situation. They said: "I felt like I was being asked to tell these people [the Russian dissidents] that because they're Russians they can't sit at the big table; they have to sit at the little table off to the side … Which felt distasteful."

In an October 2008 profile of Vladimir Putin for Vanity Fair, Gessen called him "an aspiring thug" and claimed the "backward evolution" of Russia had begun within days of his inauguration in 2000.

Gessen contributed several dozen commentaries on Russia to The New York Times blog "Latitude" between November 2011 and December 2013 on the Russian gay propaganda law and other related laws, violence toward journalists, and the depreciation of the ruble.

In March 2013, politician Vitaly Milonov promoted the Russian law against foreign adoption of Russian children by saying: "The Americans want to adopt Russian children and bring them up in perverted families like...Gessen's."

=== Dismissal from Vokrug sveta ===
Gessen was dismissed as chief editor of Russia's oldest magazine, the popular-science journal Vokrug sveta, in September 2012 after refusing to send a reporter to cover a Russian Geographical Society event about nature conservation featuring Putin, because Gessen considered it political exploitation of environmental concerns. After Gessen tweeted about their firing, Putin phoned them and said he was serious about his "nature conservation efforts". At his invitation, Gessen met him and Gessen's former publisher at the Kremlin and was offered their job back. Gessen rejected the offer.

=== Radio Liberty ===
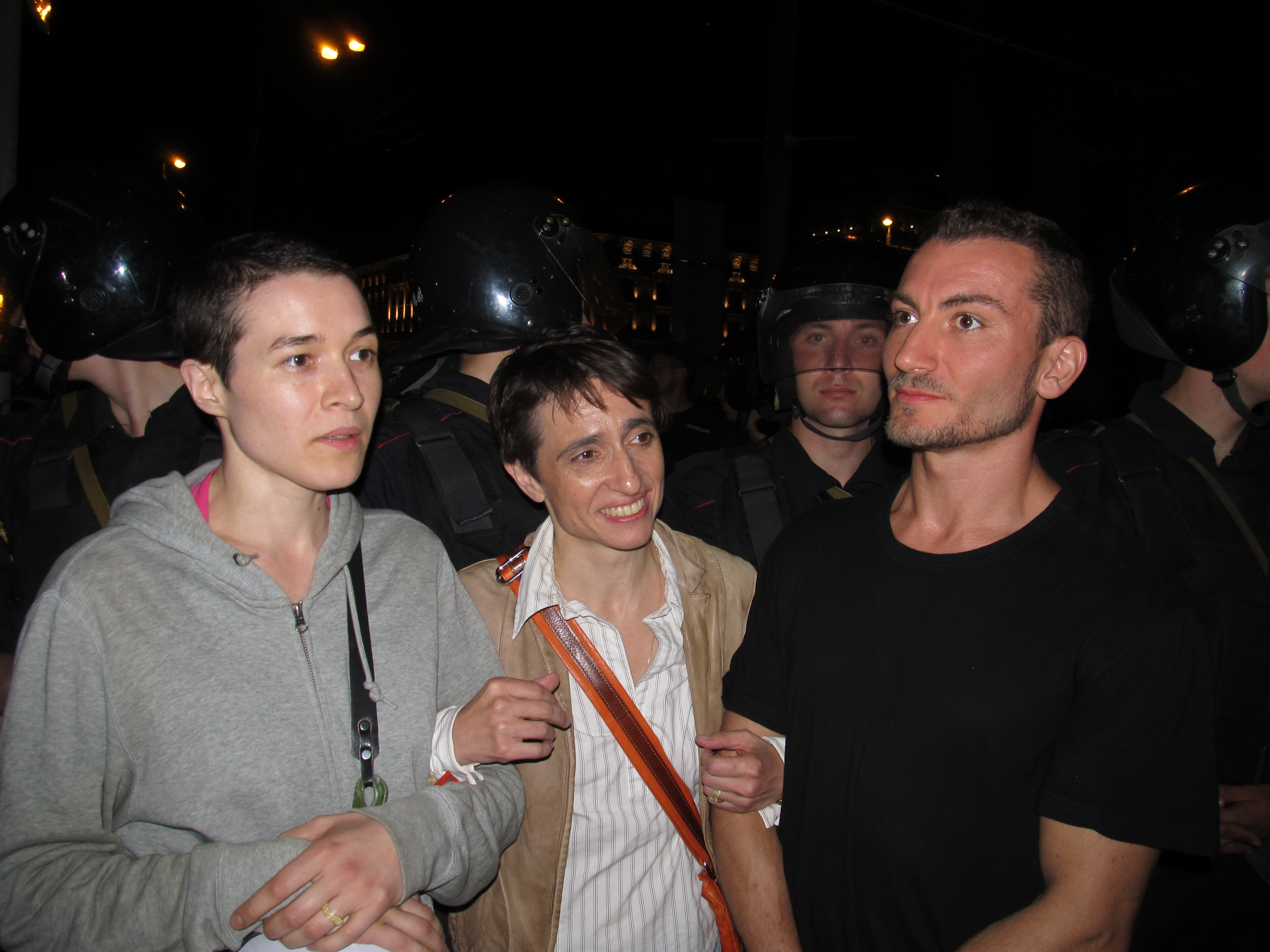
Gessen (center) and Karèn Shainyan (right) at a protest in Moscow, July 2013

In September 2012, Gessen was appointed as director of the Russian Service for Radio Liberty, a U.S. government-funded broadcaster based in Prague. Shortly after their appointment was announced and a few days after Gessen met with Putin, more than 40 members of Radio Liberty's staff were fired. The station lost its Russian broadcasting license several weeks after Gessen took over. The degree of Gessen's involvement in these events is unclear, but has caused controversy.

=== Return to the U.S. ===
In December 2013, Gessen moved to New York because Russian authorities had begun to talk about taking children away from gay parents.

In March of that year, "the St Petersburg legislator [Milonov] who had become a spokesman for the law [against 'homosexual propaganda' toward children] started mentioning me and my 'perverted family' in his interviews", and Gessen contacted an adoption lawyer asking "whether I had reason to worry that social services would go after my family and attempt to remove my oldest son, whom I adopted in 2000".

The lawyer told Gessen "to instruct my son to run if he is approached by strangers and concluding: 'The answer to your question is at the airport.'"

In June 2013, Gessen was beaten up outside of the Parliament; they said of the incident: "I realized that in all my interactions, including professional ones, I no longer felt I was perceived as a journalist first: I am now a person with a pink triangle."

Fearing that a court might annul their son's adoption without their knowledge, Gessen said they "felt like no risk was small enough to be acceptable" and "so we just had to get out".

In a January 2014 interview with ABC News, Gessen claimed that the Russian gay propaganda law had "led to a huge increase in antigay violence, including murders. It's led to attacks on gay and lesbian clubs and film festivals ... and because these laws are passed supposedly to protect children, the people who are most targeted or have the most to fear are LGBT parents."

Gessen wrote in February 2014 that Citibank had closed their bank account because of concern about Russian money-laundering operations.

Gessen worked as a translator on the FX TV channel historical drama The Americans.

As of June 2023, Gessen taught as a distinguished professor at the Craig Newmark Graduate School of Journalism at the City University of New York.

Since 2020, Gessen has intermittently taught in the Written Arts department as Distinguished Visiting Writer at Bard College. At Amherst College, they were named the John J. McCloy '16 Professor of American Institutions and International Diplomacy for the 2017–18 and 2018–19 academic years.

In October 2017, they published their tenth book, The Future is History: How Totalitarianism Reclaimed Russia.

In 2022, they were included on the Fast Company Queer 50 list.

=== Arrest warrant by Russia ===
In August 2023, Russia opened a criminal case against Gessen on charges of spreading "false information" about the Russian army's actions in Ukraine. In December 2023, it was reported that Gessen's name appeared on the Russian Interior Ministry's online wanted list. Gessen was accused of spreading "false information" after discussing atrocities in the Ukrainian city of Bucha during an interview with Russian journalist Yury Dud. In July 2024, Gessen was convicted and sentenced in absentia to 8 years in prison.

=== Award controversy ===
In August 2023, the Heinrich Böll Foundation (HBS) announced that Gessen had won the Hannah Arendt Prize for Political Thought. In December, days before the award was to be presented, the HBS said it planned to withdraw its support because it objected to Gessen's December 9 New Yorker essay In the Shadow of the Holocaust on German Holocaust memory and the Gaza war. In the essay, Gessen argued that Germany's remembrance culture regarding the Holocaust was being used as a "cynically wielded political instrument" by the Alternative for Germany (AfD) to target Muslim immigrants. Gessen was also critical of the Israeli bombings of the Gaza Strip, saying it was highly destructive and comparable to an Eastern European ghetto "being liquidated" by the Nazis. On December 16, Gessen received the award in a scaled-down ceremony.

== Personal life ==
Gessen is nonbinary and trans and uses they/them pronouns.

Gessen has dual Russian and U.S. citizenship. In 2004, they married Svetlana Generalova, a Russian citizen who was also involved in the LGBT movement in Moscow. The wedding took place in the U.S. Generalova and Gessen later divorced. By the time Gessen returned to the U.S. from Russia in December 2013, Gessen was married to Darya Oreshkina. In 2024, Gessen married Lynne Echenberg, special counsel for restorative justice in the Brooklyn District Attorney's office.

Gessen has three children.

Gessen tested positive for the BRCA mutation that is correlated with breast cancer and underwent a mastectomy in 2005.

Gessen came out as nonbinary in 2020 and began using they/them pronouns. Of their childhood, Gessen has said: "I remember, at the age of five [...] hoping that I would wake up a boy. A real boy. I had people address me by a boy's name. My parents, fortunately, were incredibly game. They were totally fine with it." As a child, Gessen used the masculine-inflected verb forms in Russian, but as a teenager they switched to the feminine inflection. In a Russian-language interview, Gessen said they continue to use the feminine form of verbs when speaking Russian.

== Awards ==
- 2005: National Jewish Book Award for Ester and Ruzya: How My Grandmothers Survived Hitler's War and Stalin's Peace
- 2012: Stora Journalistpriset (Swedish Grand Prize for Journalism), Guest of Honor
- 2013: Liberty Media Corporation, Media for Liberty award for their article "The Wrath of Putin," published in the April 2012 edition of Vanity Fair
- 2015: University of Michigan Wallenberg Medal, 24th recipient
- 2017: National Book Award for Nonfiction for The Future Is History: How Totalitarianism Reclaimed Russia
- 2018: Hitchens Prize
- 2023: Hannah Arendt Prize
- 2024: Polk Award in Commentary for In the Shadow of the Holocaust
- 2026: Pulitzer Prize in Opinion Writing for several pieces

== Summaries of select works ==
=== The Man Without a Face: The Unlikely Rise of Vladimir Putin ===
External videos
- Presentation by Gessen on The Man Without a Face, 8 March 2012, C-SPAN

In The Man Without a Face, Gessen offers an account of Putin's rise to power and summary of recent Russian politics. The book was published on 1 March 2012 and translated into 20 languages.

The New York Review of Books described the book as written in "beautifully clear and eloquent English", calling it "at heart a description of th[e] secret police milieu" from which Putin originated and "also very good at evoking ... the culture and atmosphere within which he was raised, and the values he came to espouse". The Guardian called the book "luminous"; the Telegraph called it "courageous".

CIA officer John Ehrman wrote: "As a biography it is satisfactory, but no more than that" and "little of what Gessen has to say is new". Ehrman found Gessen's depiction of Putin as essentially a gangster and a mafia don to be an oversimplification, but concluded, "The image of Putin making offers no Russian can refuse is exactly what Gessen wants us to see and is effective as anti-Putin propaganda."

=== Words Will Break Cement: The Passion of Pussy Riot ===
External videos
- Presentation by Gessen on Words Will Break Cement, 12 March 2014, C-SPAN

When this book was published in 2014, A. D. Miller wrote in the Telegraph that "even readers who do not share Gessen's esteem for Pussy Riot as artists will be convinced of their courage". Miller called Gessen "the right person to tell this story" and their journalistic approach "scrupulous and sensitive". Booklist called the book "prickly, frank, precise, and sharply witty".

The New York Times called it "urgent" and "damning". The Washington Post called the book an "excellent" portrait of Pussy Riot and said that "Gessen gives a particularly brilliant account of their trials". The Los Angeles Times said that Gessen was "Not just a keen observer of these events" but "also an impassioned partisan".

=== The Brothers: The Road to an American Tragedy ===
External videos
- Presentation by Gessen on The Brothers, 29 April 2015, C-SPAN

Published in April 2015 by Riverhead, The Brothers investigates the background of Dzhokhar and Tamerlan Tsarnaev, the perpetrators of the Boston Marathon bombing.

== Bibliography ==
=== Books ===
- Gessen, Masha (1994). The rights of lesbians and gay men in the Russian Federation : an International Gay and Lesbian Human Rights Commission report = Права гомосексуалов и лесбиянок в Российской Федерации : отчет Международной Комиссии по правам человека для гомосексуалов и лесбиянок. Foreword by Larisa I. Bogoraz; introduction by Julie Dorf. San Francisco: International Gay and Lesbian Human Rights Commission (IGLHRC).
- Gessen, Masha (translated by); Lipovskaya, Olga (preface by); Gorlanova, Nina; Volodina, Galina; Paley, Marina; Polianskaya, Irina; Tarasova, Yelena; Nabatnikova, Tatiana; Shulga, Natalia; Narbikova, Valeria; Sadur, Nina (1995). Gessen, Masha (ed.). Half a Revolution: Contemporary Fiction by Russian Women. Pittsburgh, PA: Cleis Press. ISBN 978-1-57344-006-6. OCLC 31518015.
- Gessen, Masha (1997). Dead Again: The Russian Intelligentsia After Communism. London: Verso. ISBN 978-1-85984-147-1. OCLC 36201042.
- Gessen, Masha (2004). Ester and Ruzya: How My Grandmothers Survived Hitler's War and Stalin's Peace. New York: Dial Press Trade Paperbacks. ISBN 978-0-385-33605-5. OCLC 54529515. - also known in the UK as Two Babushkas: How My Grandmothers Survived Hitler's War and Stalin's Peace
- Gessen, Masha (2008). Blood Matters: From Inherited Illness to Designer Babies, How the World and I Found Ourselves in the Future of the Gene. Orlando: Harcourt. ISBN 978-0-15-101362-3. OCLC 171151566. - a New York Times Notable Book of the year
- Gessen, Masha (2009). Perfect Rigor: A Genius and the Mathematical Breakthrough of the Century. Boston: Houghton Mifflin Harcourt. ISBN 978-0-15-101406-4. OCLC 759834681. - about Grigori Perelman
- Gessen, Masha (2012). The Man Without a Face: The Unlikely Rise of Vladimir Putin. New York: Riverhead Books. ISBN 978-1-59448-842-9. OCLC 859327104. - Short-listed for Pushkin House Russian Book Prize 2013, Long-listed for Samuel Johnson Prize for Non-Fiction 2012
- Gessen, Masha (2014). Words Will Break Cement: The Passion of Pussy Riot. New York: Riverhead Books. ISBN 978-1-59463-219-8. OCLC 880926302.
- Kasparov, Garry (foreword by) (2014). Gessen, Masha; Huff-Hannon, Joseph (eds.). Пропаганда гомосексуализма в России : истории любви / Gay Propaganda: Russian Love Stories (in Russian and English). New York: OR Books. ISBN 978-1-939293-35-0. OCLC 907537609.
- Gessen, Masha (2015). Brothers: The Road to An American Tragedy. New York: Riverhead Books. ISBN 978-1-59463-264-8. OCLC 905658714.
- Gessen, Masha (2016). Where the Jews Aren't: The Sad and Absurd Story of Birobidzhan, Russia's Autonomous Region. New York: Nextbook/Schocken. ISBN 978-0-80524-246-1. OCLC 959936125.
- Gessen, Masha (3 October 2017). The Future Is History: How Totalitarianism Reclaimed Russia. New York: Riverhead Books. ISBN 978-1594634536. - 2017 National Book Award for nonfiction
- Gessen, Masha (20 March 2018). Never Remember: Searching for Stalin's Gulags in Putin's Russia. New York: Columbia Global Reports. ISBN 978-0997722963.
- Gessen, Masha (2 June 2020). Surviving Autocracy. New York: Riverhead Books. ISBN 978-0593188934.

=== Essays and reporting ===
- Dorf, Julie; Gessen, Masha (Winter 1992). "From Russia with Homo Love" (PDF). Out/Look: 48–54. Archived from the original (PDF) on 16 October 2021.
- Gessen, Masha (2 March 2012). "Vladimir Putin and Mikhail Khodorkovsky: One Man's Truth, Another Man's Tyranny". Vanity Fair.
- Gessen, Masha (11 March 2014). "Is Vladimir Putin insane? Hardly". Los Angeles Times.
- Gessen, Masha (2 June 2017). "Opinion: Trump's Incompetence Won't Save Our Democracy". The New York Times.
- — (3 July 2017). "Forbidden lives : the stories of the gay men fleeing a purge in Chechnya". Letter from Moscow. The New Yorker. Vol. 93, no. 19. pp. 22–28.
- — (12 February 2020). "The Queer Opposition to Pete Buttigieg, Explained". Our Columnists. 12 February 2020. The New Yorker.
- — (27 July 2020). "Lorena Borjas". The Talk of the Town. 2 April 2020. The New Yorker. Vol. 96, no. 21. pp. 14–15. Archived from the original on 17 April 2020.
- Articles from The New Yorker

== See also ==
- LGBT rights in Russia
- Russia under Vladimir Putin
