= Anelise Chen =

American writer

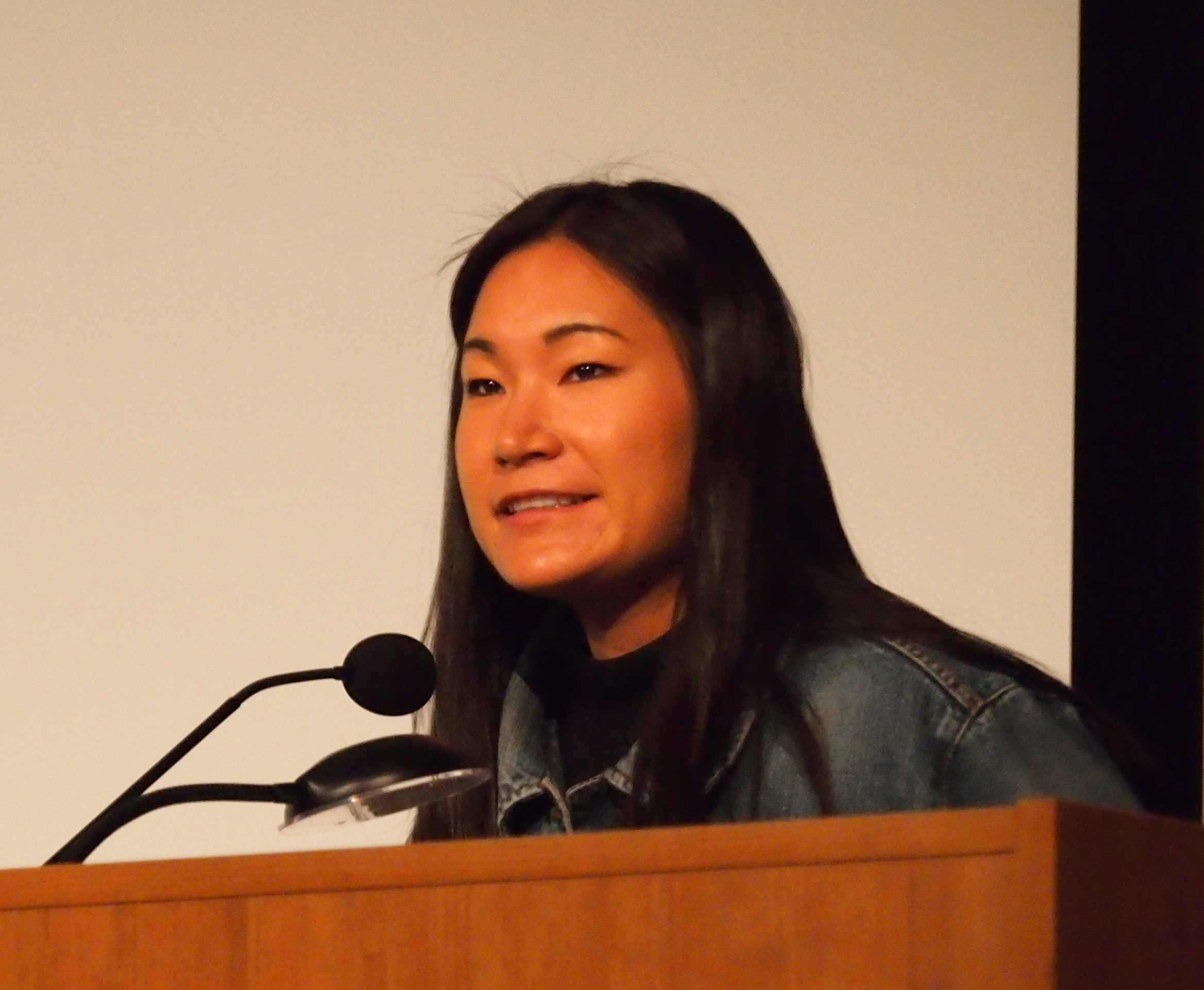
- Anelise Chen (2017)
- Born: Taipei, Taiwan
- Education: University of California, Berkeley (BA); New York University (MFA)
- Occupation: Author
- Writing career
- Notable works: So Many Olympic Exertions (2017); Clam Down: A Metamorphosis (2025)
- Notable awards: 5 Under 35 Honoree

Anelise Chen is a Taiwanese-born American author of fiction and nonfiction. She was named a "5 under 35" Honoree by the National Book Foundation in 2019.

Her first novel, So Many Olympic Exertions, was published in 2017 by Kaya Press and was named one of the best books of the year by Brooklyn Rail.

== Early life and education ==
Chen was born in Taipei, Taiwan. At a young age, she and her family moved to Los Angeles, California and she grew up in Temple City. She holds degrees from UC Berkeley (B.A. English) and New York University (M.F.A. Fiction).

She teaches writing at Columbia University and lives in New York City.

== Writing career ==
Her essays and reviews have appeared in The New York Times, National Public Radio, BOMB Magazine, The New Republic, Vice, and The Village Voice. She writes a column on mollusks for Paris Review.

Her first book, So Many Olympic Exertions, is an experimental novel that blends elements of self-help, memoir, and sports writing. Publishers Weekly characterized the book as "Formally unique and inventive, this novel fluctuates in tone, reading at some times like an authentic and unfiltered private journal and at others like a deeply researched academic essay." It was a finalist for the 2018 VCU Cabell First Novelist Award.

Her second book, Clam Down: A Metamorphosis, published by Random House in 2025, is a divorce memoir told from the perspective of a clam. Named one of "The 10 best books of 2025" by the Chicago Tribune. Kirkus Reviews described it as "A dreamlike, albeit carefully studied, tale exploring introversion, hardening one’s exterior as a means of self-protection and reliance... A poignant and wholly original memoir of liberation through confinement."

Clam Down was a finalist for the 2026 Pulitzer Prize for Memoir or Autobiography.

Chen has received residencies and fellowships from the Asian American Writers’ Workshop, Blue Mountain Center, Banff Centre, the Wurlitzer Foundation, and the Akademie Schloss Solitude in Stuttgart, Germany.

== Bibliography ==
=== Novels ===
- Chen, Anelise (2017). So Many Olympic Exertions. Kaya Press. ISBN 978-1-885030-35-1.

=== Memoirs ===
- Chen, Anelise (2025). Clam Down. New York: Random House. ISBN 978-1-9848-0184-5.
