= Ingrid Rojas Contreras =

Colombian Author

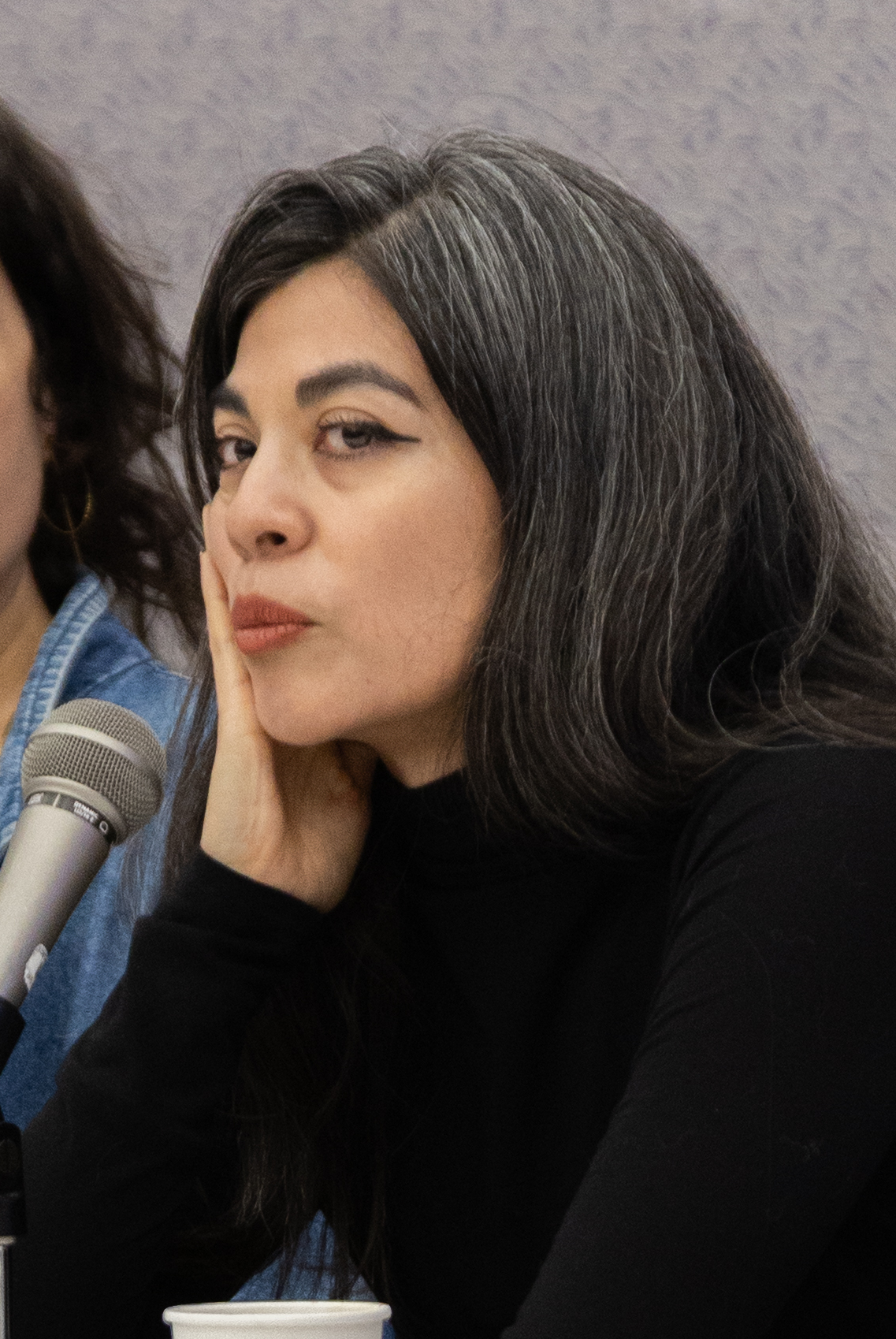
- Contreras at AWP 2025
- Occupation: Writer

Ingrid Rojas Contreras is a Colombian writer who is best known for her 2022 memoir The Man Who Could Move Clouds: A Memoir, which was a finalist for both the Pulitzer Prize for Memoir and the National Book Award for Nonfiction.

== Life ==
Rojas Contreras was born and grew up in Bogotá, Colombia and immigrated to the United States at the age of 14. She teaches fiction at the University of San Francisco and is a visiting professor at Saint Mary's College of California.

Her 2018 novel Fruit of the Drunken Tree is a fictionalized narrative of Rojas Contreras' own childhood growing up in Colombia with the backdrop of late 20th century political and social unrest and violence.

Rojas Contreras' memoir, The Man Who Could Move Clouds, details her 2012 trip back to Colombia with her mother Sojaila to explore her family's history. Rojas Contreras' family includes many curanderos, or people who are said to possess supernatural abilities such as the ability to heal, contact those who are deceased and control the weather. This includes her maternal grandfather Nono (who was one of the most famous curanderos in Colombia) and her mother, also known as Mami. Many family members have dreams or visions urging them to travel to Colombia and exhume the remains of Nono, thus prompting the return to Colombia. While in Colombia, Rojas Contreras learns about her family's history and her heritage, dating back to colonial times.

In a mixed review, writing in The New York Times, Miguel Salazar criticized the sections of the memoir pertaining to colonialism or Colombian history stating that: "Some reflections are vague, airy, even bordering on cringe. 'We were a brown people, mestizo,' Rojas Contreras gushes in language befitting a Goya commercial." However, Salazar concluded that the work was a "spellbinding and genre-defying history." In contrast, Kirkus Reviews wrote positively of the memoir, noting, "Strongest of all are sections in which Rojas Contreras plays on the theme of amnesia to note that it pertains as much to willful maltreatment on the part of a country’s oppressors...as to individuals saddled with a medical affliction, calamities endured through no fault of the victims."

Rojas Contreras contributed the essay "Invisible" for the anthology Wild Tongues Can't Be Tamed: 15 Voices from the Latinx Diaspora, published by Flatiron Books in 2021.

== Works ==
- Fruit of the Drunken Tree. Doubleday. 2018
- The Man Who Could Move Clouds: A Memoir. Doubleday. 2022
