= Liliana's Invincible Summer =

2023 book by Cristina Rivera Garza

Liliana's Invincible Summer: A Sister's Search for Justice
- Author: Cristina Rivera Garza
- Language: English and Spanish
- Publisher: Penguin Random House
- Publication date: 2023
- Publication place: United States/Mexico
- ISBN: 9780593244111

Liliana's Invincible Summer: A Sister's Search for Justice (Published in Spanish as El invencible verano de Liliana) is a 2023 book by Cristina Rivera Garza, published by Penguin Random House. In the book, Rivera Garza paints a portrait of her sister, Liliana, who was murdered in 1990 Mexico by her ex-boyfriend. The suspected murderer fled and was never brought to justice. Rivera Garza attempts to obtain the police files regarding the murder, interviews Liliana's friends, family members, and reads her letters and personal writings in order to depict her sister's life and her loss. The book also discusses the feminism movement in Mexico and intimate partner violence as a societal issue.

The book was a finalist for the 2023 National Book Award for Nonfiction and winner of the Pulitzer Prize for Memoir or Autobiography.

== Narrative ==
Rivera Garza travels to Mexico to attempt to document her sister Liliana's murder in 1990. Liliana was in university studying architecture and was a competitive swimmer when in 1990, at the age of 20, she was murdered by her ex-boyfriend Angel Gonzalez Ramos. The suspected murderer fled and was never brought to justice. Rivera Garza speaks to Mexican police and attempts to review the case files regarding the murder, but these were not available, having been lost. Rivera interviews Liliana's father, her friends and reads her personal writings and letters to paint a personal portrait of her sister. Using modern scholarship and research, she uncovers the warning signs of intimate partner violence that were present in Liliana's life but that were not known to her or her loved ones in the 1990s. She explains how in the past, intimate partner violence was absolved as "crimes of passion" or that perpetrators had "snapped".

Rivera Garza also explores the issue of femicide in Mexico and how, in recent years, the large rate of crimes against women has sparked large waves of protest. Putting violence against women as a major issue on Mexico’s political agenda.

Femicide is the intentional killing with a gender-related motivation.

== Reception ==
Writing for The New York Times, Katherine Dykstra stated that by incorporating long, unedited interviews, long sections of letters, and preserving Liliana's voice in her own writing, it created for a challenging read as the reader is left to interpret these contemporary primary sources for semblances of meaning. However, Dykstra stated Rivera Garza was able to paint a vivid, intimate, sympathetic portrait of her sister. Writing for The Washington Post, Erika L. Sanchez praised Rivera Garza's storytelling of sister's life, despite how "Not everything can be put into words, especially grief and rage, no matter how precise and skilled the writing is. The beauty of this book is that it reaches for the truth regardless, and in doing so, Liliana becomes indelible. She is so fully realized that by the end, the reader is also mourning. I will be thinking of Liliana for a very long time, perhaps forever."
