= Sarah Chihaya =

American writer, professor, and literary critic

Sarah Chihaya (Sarah Anne Miki Chihaya, born c. 1984) is an American writer, professor, and literary critic. In 2020, she was one of several co-authors of The Ferrante Letters: An Experiment in Collective Criticism, published by Columbia University Press. In 2025, she released her debut memoir, Bibliophobia, with Random House. Bibliophobia was a finalist for the 2026 Pulitzer Prize.

== Early life and education ==
Chihaya grew up in Ohio as the child of Japanese and Japanese-Canadian immigrants.

She earned a Bachelor of Arts degree from Yale University in 2005, studying English and French. Her undergraduate thesis was titled “Si chaotique, si morcelé: History and Fiction in Patrick Modiano’s Rue des boutiques obscures and Dora Bruder.”

Chihaya received a Ph.D. in Comparative Literature from the University of California, Berkeley. Her doctoral dissertation, completed in Fall 2013, was titled “The Unseen World: Denarrative Desire in the Contemporary British Novel.”

== Career ==
Chihaya's book reviews, interviews, and essays have appeared in The New Yorker, The New York Review of Books, Los Angeles Review of Books, The Nation, The Yale Review, and other publications.

Chihaya has served as an English professor at Princeton University. She has also taught at the University of California, Berkeley and New York University.

In 2020, Chihaya was the co-author of The Ferrante Letters: An Experiment in Collective Criticism alongside Merve Emre, Katherine Hill, and Juno Jill Richards. The book was published by Columbia University Press.

In 2023, Chihaya earned a Whiting Award in Creative Nonfiction for her then-forthcoming debut memoir Bibliophobia. The judges stated: "Soul-baring, witty, and slyly provocative, Bibliophobia unsettles our most widespread and unexamined beliefs about books and reading."

In 2025, Chihaya released Bibliophobia, which discusses her complicated relationships to books along with several difficult experiences in her life. The New Republic called it "a welcome splash of lemony sourness to cut the bland sweetness of much popular discourse about books, which can tend toward boosterism, bibliotherapy, or... a nostalgic relation to books as objects and symbols that sometimes has little to do with the actual practice of reading."
