= 2023 Pulitzer Prize =

Awards for journalism and related fields

The 2023 Pulitzer Prizes were awarded by the Pulitzer Prize Board for work during the 2022 calendar year on May 8, 2023.

== Prizes ==
Winners and finalists for the prizes are listed below, with the winners marked in bold.

=== Journalism ===
Public Service
**Associated Press** "for the work of Mstyslav Chernov, Evgeniy Maloletka, Vasilisa Stepanenko and Lori Hinnat, "courageous reporting from the besieged city of Mariupol that bore witness to the slaughter of civilians in Russia's invasion of Ukraine."
Austin American-Statesman, in collaboration with the USA Today Network, "for unflinching coverage of local law enforcement's flawed response to the massacre of 19 school children and two teachers in Uvalde, Texas, including a haunting video of police delays."
The Washington Post, "for an exhaustive investigation of the fentanyl crisis ravaging families across the country that tracked the import and distribution of the drug and the government's failure to address the epidemic of addiction."

Breaking News Reporting
**Staff of the Los Angeles Times,** "for revealing a secretly recorded conversation among city officials that included racist comments, followed by coverage of the rapidly resulting turmoil and deeply reported pieces that delved further into the racial issues affecting local politics."
Josh Gerstein, Alex Ward, Peter S. Canellos, Hailey Fuchs, and Heidi Przybyla of Politico, "for exclusive coverage of the unprecedented leak of a draft Supreme Court opinion overturning Roe v. Wade and giving states the power to regulate abortion. (Moved by the jury from National Reporting, where it originally was entered.)"
Staff of The New York Times, "for its urgent and comprehensive coverage of New York City's deadliest fire in decade, expertly combining accountability reporting across platforms with compassionate portraits of the 17 victims and the Gambian community that had long called the Bronx high-rise home."

Investigative Reporting
**Staff of The Wall Street Journal,** "for sharp accountability reporting on financial conflicts of interest among officials at 50 federal agencies, revealing those who bought and sold stocks they regulated and other ethical violations by individuals charged with safeguarding the public's interest."
Joaquin Palomino and Trisha Thadani of The San Francisco Chronicle, "for an investigation into the city's failure to fulfill promises to provide safe housing for its homeless citizens, including the creation of a database that showed the concentration of overdose deaths among residents of government-funded tenements."
Staff of The Star Tribune, Minneapolis, Minn., "for exposing systematic failures in the state's juvenile justice system that endangered the lives of young people and crime victims, reporting that contributed to the most sweeping legislative changes in the system in three decades."

Explanatory Reporting
**Caitlin Dickerson of The Atlantic**, "for deeply reported and compelling accounting of the Trump administration policy that forcefully separated migrant children from their parents, resulting in abuses that have persisted under the current administration."
Duaa Eldeib of ProPublica, "for poignant, comprehensive reporting that clearly demonstrated how the U.S. healthcare system has failed to lower the number of preventable stillbirths in the country."
Terrence McCoy of The Washington Post, "for his sweeping examination of the destruction of the Amazon, using rich data and images that explores the conflicts between those people who see it as their birthright to exploit the area, those who seek to preserve indigenous communities and those desperate to protect the earth."

Local Reporting
**Anna Wolfe of Mississippi Today**, Ridgeland, Miss., "for reporting that revealed how a former Mississippi governor used his office to steer millions of state welfare dollars to benefit his family and friends, including NFL quarterback Brett Favre."
**John Archibald, Ashley Remkus, Ramsey Archibald, and Challen Stephens of AL.com**, "for a series exposing how the police force in the town of Brookside preyed on residents to inflate revenue, coverage that prompted the resignation of the police chief, four new laws and a state audit."
Staff of the Los Angeles Times, "for coverage of the state's legal cannabis industry that combined satellite imagery, public records searches and sometimes dangerous on-the-ground reporting to reveal widespread criminality, labor abuses and environmental consequences."

National Reporting
**Caroline Kitchener of The Washington Post**, "for unflinching reporting that captured the complex consequences of life after Roe v. Wade, including the story of a Texas teenager who gave birth to twins after new restrictions denied her an abortion."
Joshua Schneyer, Mica Rosenberg and Kristina Cooke of Reuters, "for a yearlong investigation that exposed how two of the world's largest automakers and a major poultry supplier in Alabama violated child labor laws and exploited undocumented immigrant children."
Stephania Taladrid, contributing writer, The New Yorker, "for sweeping and empathetic reporting on individuals caught in the abortion fight in New Mexico, Texas, and Mexico, including stories about an abortion underground, women and girls trying to get health care, and the final days of a Houston abortion clinic."

International Reporting
**Staff of The New York Times**, "for their unflinching coverage of Russia's invasion of Ukraine, including an eight-month investigation into Ukrainian deaths in the town of Bucha and the Russian unit responsible for the killings."
Paul Carsten, David Lewis, Reade Levinson and Libby George of Reuters, "for their reporting on Nigeria's campaign of lethal violence carried out by the military over a decade in which they forced thousands of women to undergo abortions after being freed from sexual captivity by Boko Haram rebels and also slaughtered dozens of their living children."
Yaroslav Trofimov and James Marson of The Wall Street Journal, "for prescient on-the-ground reporting from the shifting front lines of the war in Ukraine that presaged the Russian assault on Kyiv and chronicled the tenacious resistance of Ukrainian soldiers and civilians amidst so much destruction."

Feature Writing
**Eli Saslow of The Washington Post**, "for evocative individual narratives about people struggling with the pandemic, homelessness, addiction and inequality that collectively form a sharply-observed portrait of contemporary America."
Elizabeth Bruenig of The Atlantic, "for exposing the tortuous last hours of inmates awaiting execution on Alabama's death row and the efforts by the state to conceal the suffering, which led to a temporary moratorium on executions."
Janelle Nanos of The Boston Globe, "for her decade-long investigation of a woman's quest to confirm her childhood sexual abuse that finally uncovered evidence that seemed to verify the horrors."

Commentary
**Kyle Whitmire of AL.com**, "for measured and persuasive columns that document how Alabama's Confederate heritage still colors the present with racism and exclusion, told through tours of its first capital, its mansions and monuments–and through the history that has been omitted."
Monica Hesse of The Washington Post, "for columns that convey the anger and dread that many Americans felt about losing their right to abortion after the Supreme Court overturned Roe v. Wade."
Xochitl Gonzales of The Atlantic, "for thoughtful, versatile and entertaining columns that explore how gentrification and the predominant white culture in the U.S. stifle the physical and emotional expression of racial minorities. (Moved by the jury from Criticism, where it originally was entered.)"

Criticism
**Andrea Long Chu of New York magazine**, "for book reviews that scrutinize authors as well as their works, using multiple cultural lenses to explore some of society's most fraught topics."
Jason Farago of The New York Times, "for art criticism, especially for taking a critical eye to the frontlines of Ukraine to explore the cultural dimensions of the war, including verifying damages to architecture and other sites and explaining Russia's efforts to erase the Ukrainian identity."
Lyndsay C. Green of the Detroit Free Press, "for rigorously reported coverage of restaurant openings and recommended dishes that also serve as an immersive cultural portrait of a vital American city."

Editorial Writing
**Miami Herald Editorial Board**, for "editorials on the failure of Florida public officials to deliver on many taxpayer-funded amenities and services promised to residents over decades."
Alex Kingsbury of The New York Times, "for highlighting the existential threat of terror and violence committed by right-wing political extremists, and making the case that the United States already has the tools to fight back if resources are dedicated to the effort."
Lisa Falkenberg, Joe Holley, Nick Powell and the late Michael Lindenberger of the Houston Chronicle, "for helping Texas readers to understand the Uvalde tragedy––the shooting as well as the failure of police and other officials to respond––and encouraging them to channel grief into action to protect the public going forward."

Illustrated Reporting and Commentary
**Mona Chalabi, contributor, The New York Times**, "for striking illustrations that combine statistical reporting with keen analysis to help readers understand the immense wealth and economic power of Amazon founder Jeff Bezos."
Matt Davies of Newsday, Long Island, "for his sharp editorial perspective on the year's political figures, rendered in distinctive drawings that avoid formulaic punchlines and are often from the vantage point of those who are not in power."
Pia Guerra, contributor, The Washington Post, "for her elegant black-and-white drawings that offer insightful commentary on the year's biggest news events, illustrations distinguished by their simplicity, playfulness and emotional punch."

Breaking News Photography
**Photography Staff of Associated Press**, "for unique and urgent images from the first weeks of Russia's invasion of Ukraine, including the devastation of Mariupol after other news organizations left, victims of the targeting of civilian infrastructure and the resilience of the Ukrainian people who were able to flee."
Lynsey Addario of The New York Times, "for her single image of a Ukrainian mother, her two children and a church member splayed on the street of a Kyiv suburb after a mortar shell exploded on a "safe passage" route–a photograph that clearly showed that Russia was targeting civilians."
Rafiq Maqbool and Eranga Jayawardena of Associated Press, "for a compelling visual narrative documenting public fury over Sri Lanka's economic collapse, including clashes between protesters and police, the takeover of government buildings and jubilation as protesters occupied the plush presidential mansion."

Feature Photography
**Christina House of the Los Angeles Times**, "for an intimate look into the life of a pregnant 22-year-old woman living on the street in a tent–images that show her emotional vulnerability as she tries and ultimately loses the struggle to raise her child."
Gabrielle Lurie and Stephen Lam of The San Francisco Chronicle, "for their painstaking documentation of fentanyl addiction in the city that led officials to create supervised drug consumption locations and voters to approve an oversight commission for the homeless hotels where 40% of overdoses occur."
Photography staff of Associated Press, "for images capturing the vulnerability, trauma and defiance of elderly Ukrainians caught in the Russian invasion, many of them unable or unwilling to flee the carnage."

Audio Reporting
**Staff of Gimlet Media, notably Connie Walker**, "whose investigation into her father's troubled past revealed a larger story of abuse of hundreds of Indigenous children at an Indian residential school in Canada, including other members of Walker's extended family, a personal search for answers expertly blended with rigorous investigative reporting."
Jenn Abelson, Nicole Dungca, Reena Flores, Sabby Robinson and Linah Mohammad of The Washington Post, "for 'Broken Doors,' a powerful examination of the human toll of no-knock warrants across the country, using the voices of police, judges and the victims of the surprise raids, reporting that led to policy changes and, in one case, to prosecutors dropping a death penalty request."
Kate Wells, Sarah Hulett, Lindsey Smith, Laura Weber-Davis and Paulette Parker of Michigan Radio, "for a visceral documentary recorded behind the closed doors of an abortion clinic, allowing listeners to hear conversations between practitioners and patients, and the controversial procedure itself."

=== Letters, drama, and music ===
Fiction
**Demon Copperhead**, by Barbara Kingsolver
**Trust**, by Hernan Diaz
The Immortal King Rao, by Vauhini Vara

Drama
**English**, by Sanaz Toossi
On Sugarland, by Aleshea Harris
The Far Country, by Lloyd Suh

History
**Freedom's Dominion: A Saga of White Resistance to Federal Power**, by Jefferson Cowie
Seeing Red: Indigenous Land, American Expansion, and the Political Economy of Plunder in North America, by Michael John Witgen
Watergate: A New History, by Garrett M. Graff

Biography
**G-Man: J. Edgar Hoover and the Making of the American Century**, by Beverly Gage
His Name Is George Floyd: One Man's Life and the Struggle for Racial Justice, by Robert Samuels and Toluse Olorunnipa
Mr. B: George Balanchine's 20th Century, by Jennifer Homans

Memoir or Autobiography
**Stay True**, by Hua Hsu
Easy Beauty: A Memoir, by Chloé Cooper Jones
The Man Who Could Move Clouds: A Memoir, by Ingrid Rojas Contreras

Poetry
**Then the War: and Selected Poems, 2007–2020**, by Carl Phillips
Blood Snow, by dg nanouk okpik
Still Life, by Jay Hopler (posthumous)

General Nonfiction
**His Name Is George Floyd: One Man's Life and the Struggle for Racial Justice**, by Robert Samuels and Toluse Olorunnipa (moved by the board from the Biography category)
Kingdom of Characters: The Language Revolution That Made China Modern, by Jing Tsu
Sounds Wild and Broken: Sonic Marvels, Evolution's Creativity, and the Crisis of Sensory Extinction, by David G. Haskell
Under the Skin: The Hidden Toll of Racism on American Lives and on the Health of Our Nation, by Linda Villarosa

Music
**Omar**, by Rhiannon Giddens and Michael Abels
Monochromatic Light (Afterlife), by Tyshawn Sorey
Perspective, by Jerrilynn Patton
