= Zhou Houkun =

Chinese engineer (c. 1890–after 1959)

- 周厚坤
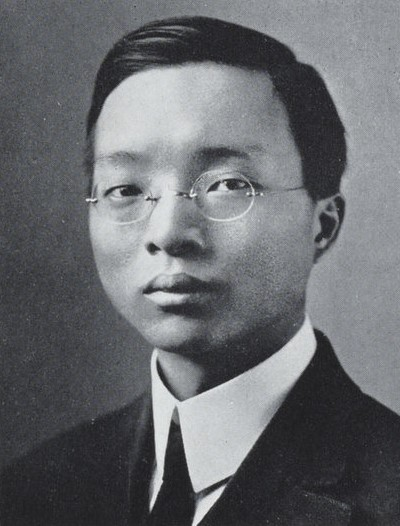
- Zhou in 1914
- Born: c. 1890; Wuxi, Jiangsu, Qing China
- Died: After 1959
- Education: Massachusetts Institute of Technology
- Known for: Chinese typewriter design

Zhou Houkun
- Chinese: 周厚坤
Transcriptions
Standard Mandarin
- Hanyu Pinyin: Zhōu Hòukūn
- Wade–Giles: Chou1 Hou4-k'un1

Zhou Houkun (Chinese: 周厚坤, c. 1890 – after 1959), also written Chow Hou-kun, was a Chinese engineer and inventor best known for his Chinese typewriter design. Born in Wuxi, China, Zhou was selected for the Boxer Indemnity Scholarship and arrived in the United States in 1910. There, he attended the University of Illinois Urbana-Champaign and the Massachusetts Institute of Technology (MIT), studying a range of engineering fields. At MIT, he assisted in the development of the wind tunnel and researched the use of bamboo to reinforce concrete.

While studying at MIT, Zhou developed a prototype for a Chinese typewriter, which could produce 4,000 common Chinese characters. His prototype received international attention and was featured in The New York Times and Popular Science. He returned to China in an effort to mass-produce the typewriter alongside the Commercial Press; due to poor production quality, Zhou never saw the mass production of his design. After his contract with Commercial Press ended, he worked as an engineer for various Chinese companies, as the chief editor of the Journal of The Chinese Engineering Society, and as the vice president of Shanghai Industrial Junior College, which he cofounded in 1940. He fled from China during its communist revolution and retired in the United States.

== Early life and education ==
Zhou Houkun was born in Wuxi, China, sometime between 1889 and 1891. His family had previously attained wealth through silkworm farming. Zhou's mother died when he was young; his father was the first in his family to become a Confucian scholar instead of a farmer or merchant. Zhou attended Nanyang College in Shanghai and Tangshan Railway and Mining College.

Zhou was selected as an Indemnity Scholar in 1910, giving him and other Chinese students the opportunity to travel abroad and study in other countries. He departed from Shanghai on 16 August of that year and arrived in San Francisco on 11 September. From there, Zhou travelled to the University of Illinois Urbana-Champaign, studying railway engineering for a year. He then transferred to the Massachusetts Institute of Technology (MIT) and studied aeronautical engineering.

At MIT, Zhou assisted in the development of the wind tunnel alongside Jerome Clarke Hunsaker and developed an ink-grinding machine in 1913. He participated in the university's Cosmopolitan Club, Rifle Club, and the Chinese Students' Alliance, of which he was the president. In the spring of 1914, Zhou graduated from MIT with bachelor's degrees in mechanical engineering and naval architecture. He wrote two theses that year; the first was on the use of bamboo to reinforce concrete and was the first to conduct experiments combining the two materials. His second thesis was entitled "The Effect of Time on the Elongation and Set of Copper and Composition Wires". In 1915, he received his master's degree in aeronautical engineering at MIT, the first such degree awarded in the field in the United States. His thesis "Experimental Determination of Damping Coefficients in the Stability of Aeroplanes" was featured in the periodical Aerial Age Weekly.

== Career ==
=== Chinese typewriter ===
At a 1912 trade show, hosted at the Mechanics Hall in Boston, Zhou witnessed the operation of a Monotype machine. Inspired, he sought to create an equivalent machine for the Chinese language. He quickly understood that due to fundamental differences between English and Chinese, his typewriter would require a drastically different design than what was standard at the time. Zhou opposed the modification or abandonment of Chinese in order to more easily adapt to alphabet-based technologies, and believed that the development of a Chinese typewriter was a problem of engineering, not of the language itself.

Beginning work in the summer of 1914, Zhou reviewed the manuals for Devello Sheffield's older Chinese typewriter design, noting its shortcomings. Zhou first assigned each Chinese character to a spot on a flat grid, then imposed the grids over four cylinders, each 10 inches (25 cm) long and capable of holding up to 1,500 characters. This approach allowed his typewriter to print a similar amount of characters to Sheffield's design, which was the size of a "small table", while occupying much less space. The characters were sorted by their Kangxi radicals and stroke counts and were typed using a selector needle, which was placed over the letter and pressed. Pressing the selector needle over a character caused a hammer to strike it into the paper. Zhou selected 4,000 commonly used characters for his first prototype, which ended up measuring 24 by 36 inches (61 by 91 cm) and weighing 40 pounds (18 kg).

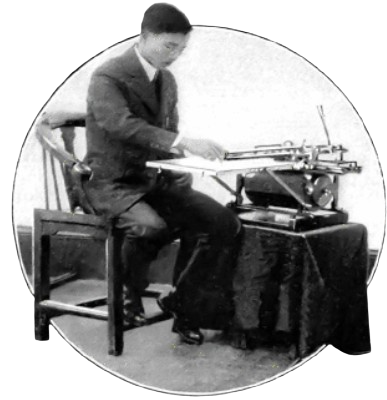
Zhou with his typewriter in 1917

Days before Zhou published an article detailing the technical aspects and difficulties of the development of his typewriter in The Chinese Student's Monthly, multiple newspapers published stories on the typewriter developed by Qi Xuan (Chinese: 祁暄), a student at New York University. Qi's design differed by Zhou's in that it broke characters into separate elements, instead of maintaining them whole, thus potentially allowing more characters to be typed. Zhou criticized Qi's design in his 1915 Chinese Student's Monthly article, specifically attacking his approach of splitting the characters into pieces; Zhou believed that it was imperative to keep the characters in the whole form in which they were written. Qi's response, which defended his modular design and insulted Zhou's intelligence, was published in The Chinese Student's Monthly shortly after.

Zhou and Qi's feud notwithstanding, Zhou's typewriter received widespread attention internationally. A 1916 New York Times article described his invention in detail, concluding with Zhou's belief that his invention would become popular among Chinese offices and writers. A photograph of him and his invention appeared in the April 1917 issue of Popular Science.

=== Return to China ===
Following his graduation from MIT, Zhou was briefly employed by the Curtiss Aeroplane and Motor Company. Motivated by his desire to mass-produce his typewriter for the Chinese people's use, as well as to care for his aging father, he decided against remaining in America. Bringing the prototype with him, he left the United States and returned to Shanghai in 1916. The Commercial Press in Shanghai agreed to finance the development and production of his design. Due to the publicity his typewriter had attained, Zhou received many invitations to give speeches across China. In a speech given on 22 July 1916, he implored a crowd to value manual labor and industry over China's "feeble" scholar class. Just ten days after Zhou's return to China, his father died of a sudden illness.

Despite Zhou's high expectations, he quickly encountered issues in the mass production of his prototype. China's industrial capabilities were far inferior to those of the United States at that time, leading to much lower production quality. None of the ten factories in China with which Zhou worked met his standards. In a meeting with Commercial Press director Zhang Yuanji (Chinese: 張元濟), Zhou asked for permission to work with American factories; instead, Zhang released Zhou from his contract. Commercial Press employee Shu Zhendong (Chinese: 舒震东) took over the project and improved on Zhou's design; Shu's Chinese typewriter became the first to reach mass production.

Following his tenure at Commercial Press, Zhou worked as an engineer for various companies, including Han Yeh Ping Iron and Coal Company, Mobile Shanghai and Texaco Shanghai. He was also the chief editor of the Journal of The Chinese Engineering Society and the vice president of Shanghai Industrial Junior College, which he cofounded in 1940. In addition to his typewriter, he also designed an "impact-proof ship" in 1933. Fleeing the Chinese communist revolution, Zhou emigrated from China in 1949 and returned to the United States, where he eventually retired. There is no record of Zhou ever marrying. He was still alive by 1959, as he received an invitation to the Federation of Hong Kong Industries that year.

== Bibliography ==
- Mascarenhas-Mateus, João; Pires, Ana Paula, eds. (8 July 2021). History of Construction Cultures. Vol. 2. CRC Press. ISBN 9781000468762.
- McCormick, Barnes Warnock; Newberry, Conrad F.; Jumper, Eric, eds. (2004). Aerospace Engineering Education During the First Century of Flight. American Institute of Aeronautics and Astronautics. ISBN 9781563477102.
- Mullaney, Thomas (8 August 2017). The Chinese Typewriter: A History. MIT Press. ISBN 9780262340779.
- Pretel, David; Camprubí, Lino, eds. (13 June 2018). Technology and Globalisation: Networks of Experts in World History. Springer International Publishing. ISBN 9783319754505.
- Tsu, Jing (18 January 2022). Kingdom of Characters: The Language Revolution that Made China Modern. Penguin Press. ISBN 9780735214743.
