= Devello Z. Sheffield =

American missionary and educator (1841–1913)

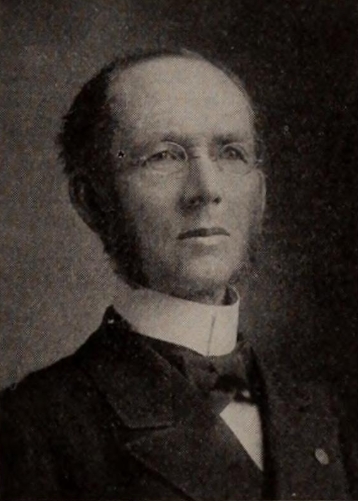
- Born: Devello Zelotes Sheffield; August 13, 1841; Gainesville, New York, U.S.
- Died: July 1, 1913 (aged 71); Tongzhou, China
- Education: Auburn Theological Seminary
- Occupations: Presbyterian minister; Missionary; President of the North China College
- Organization: American Board of Commissioners for Foreign Missions

Devello Zelotes Sheffield (August 13, 1841 – July 1, 1913) was an American missionary, educator, and inventor. After serving with the 7th New York Infantry Regiment during the American Civil War, he began a career in education before becoming a Presbyterian minister. Soon after, he was sent on a mission to Tongzhou, China. Although he found little success with direct evangelization efforts, he recognized the potential value of schooling young locals in theological and secular subjects. He led the school in Tongzhou until it was designated as the North China College in 1893; he then became the president of the college, a position he held until 1909. He returned to teaching in 1910 and continued to do so until his health failed in late 1912; he died the following July.

In addition to his work in education, Sheffield, a skilled speaker and interpreter of Chinese, published numerous Chinese-language textbooks. He also was a member of two committees that aimed to translate the Old and New Testament into Chinese. He used his talent in mechanics to create the first Chinese typewriter, although it never reached mass production.

== Early life and military service ==
Devello Zelotes Sheffield was born on August 13, 1841, in Gainesville, New York. He was the son of Caroline Murry and Asa Campbell Sheffield, a farmer. After attending schools in Warsaw, Middlebury, and Alexander, he joined the Union Army of the Potomac in 1861, serving with the 7th New York Infantry Regiment during the American Civil War. After two years of service, he was discharged due to an illness that continued to ail him throughout his life.

== Career ==
=== Missionary work ===
After returning from the Civil War, Sheffield began a career in education, becoming the principal of a high school in Castile, New York. While in his mid-twenties, he entered a phase of religious skepticism before becoming a member of the Presbyterian Church. In 1866, the same year as his conversion, he began attending the Auburn Theological Seminary; he graduated and was ordained as a Presbyterian minister on May 2, 1869. He married Eleanor Sherill of Pike, New York, on July 27, 1869; Sherill also had worked in education previously. Soon after, Sheffield was sent on a mission to China by the American Board of Commissioners for Foreign Missions (ABCFM). Joined by Eleanor, Sheffield departed from San Francisco on October 4 and arrived at his station in Tongzhou on November 28. In Tongzhou, he joined the Reverend Lyman D. Chapin, who had yet to find much success in converting the locals after establishing the permanent mission station there two years prior.

After his arrival, Sheffield dedicated himself to learning Chinese; he became a highly proficient speaker and interpreter of the language due to his diligence. He also began to preach in Tongzhou and other nearby villages. Similarly to Chapin, Sheffield struggled to convert many of the impoverished locals and faced hostility from the literati. He and his wife had three daughters and two sons. One of his children, Alfred D. Sheffield, was born in Tongzhou in 1878 and eventually became professor emeritus of English composition and group leadership at Wellesley College.

=== Work in education ===
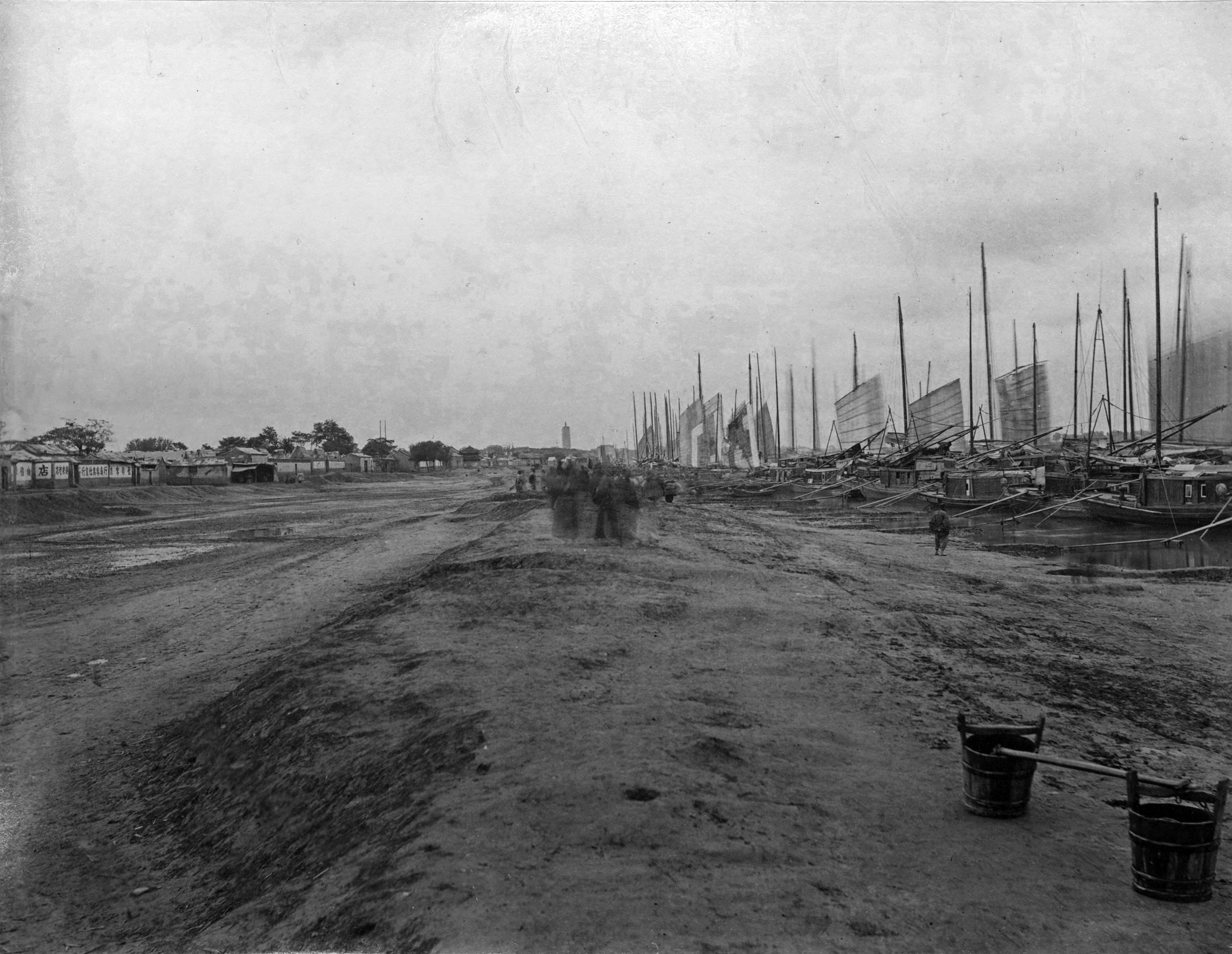
Tongzhou c. 1879

Despite his lack of success, Sheffield initially remained optimistic and persisted with his preaching, but by 1877, his failure to convert the locals had begun to frustrate him. In July of that year, he compared the futility of his evangelization to "sowing seed on the waters". Sheffield thus shifted his efforts towards the education of young boys in a schoolhouse constructed in 1876 and 1877. There, students received instruction in both theological and secular subjects, such as Chinese and arithmetic; Sheffield himself taught systematic theology there. Although strict with his students, Sheffield was a skilled instructor and preacher. In autumn 1877, seventeen boys were enrolled at the schoolhouse, which offered its students free courses and lodging. Although the students received basic instruction in some secular subjects, Sheffield was adamant that these subjects should not take precedence over Christian teachings.

Throughout the early 1880s, Sheffield's missionary work continued to gain little traction, although he did note the potential of the work done at the schools in Tongzhou. In 1884, Sheffield formed part of an ABCFM committee discussing the establishment of a college in Tianjin. Proposed by the missionary Charles A. Stanley, the college would teach a wide range of secular subjects, including English, mathematics, and the sciences. Sheffield voiced his opposition to the plan; he felt that it was inappropriate to use mission funds for a college that did not have evangelization as its main focus. He also objected to the proposed instruction of English at the college, which he thought would attract students solely interested in learning the language for business opportunities. Sheffield thus refused to sign off on Stanley's proposal, which never came to fruition; Stanley speculated that Sheffield was jealous of his proposal due to Sheffield's involvement at the Tongzhou school.

The Tongzhou school continued its slow growth into the late 1880s; for the 1886–87 school year, it was designated as a high school for the first time and instructed 30 pupils. In 1888, Sheffield wrote a letter to the ABCFM advocating for the creation of a college, noting Tongzhou as his preferred location. The ABCFM consented, though they stipulated that the college should be "strictly Christian" in nature. Somewhat shifting from his previous position, Sheffield responded by emphasizing the necessity of some secular education in evangelization.

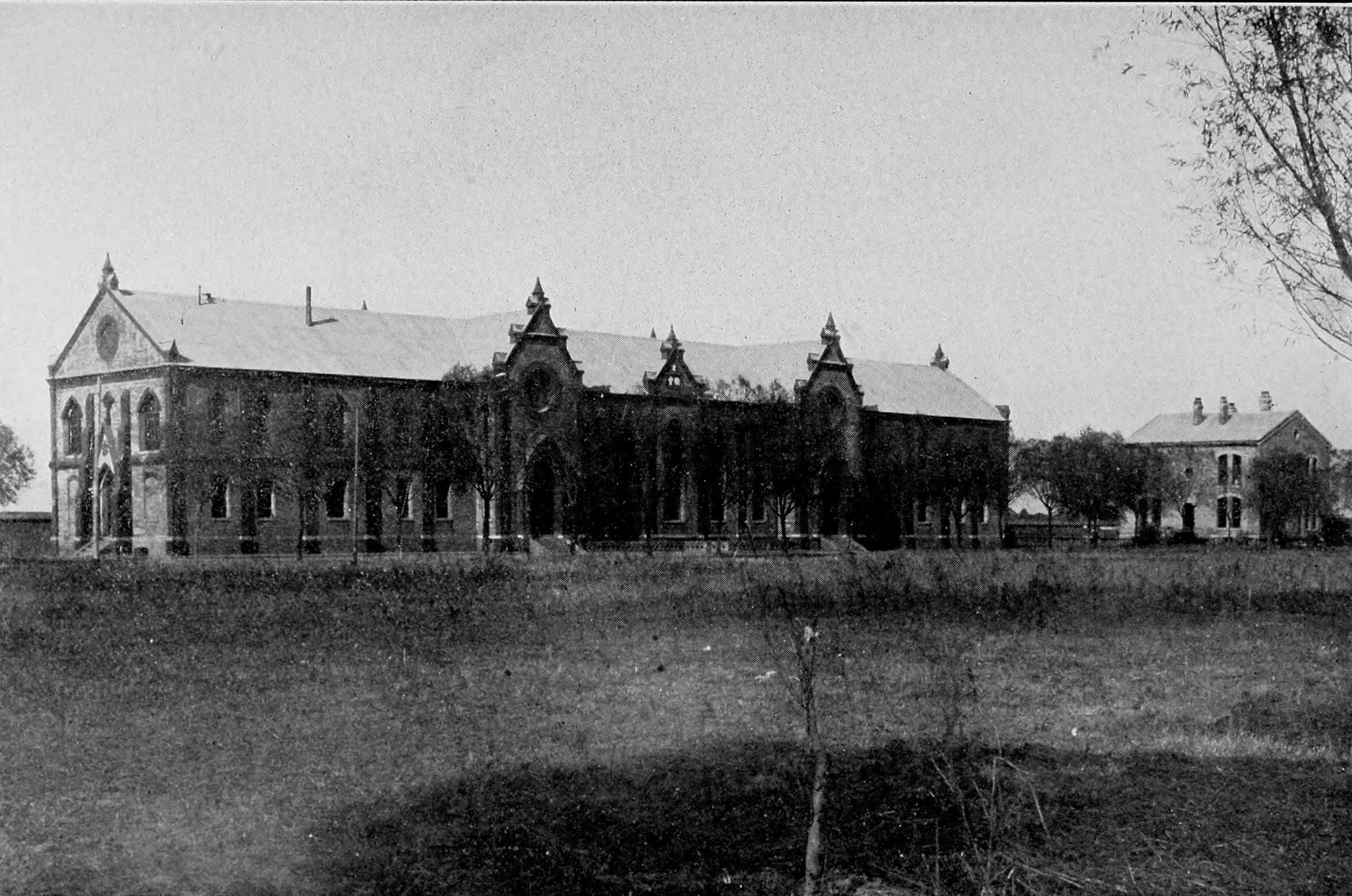
The North China College

In the spring of 1889, the ABCFM approved the formation of a college in Tongzhou through the reorganization of the city's existing schools. By the 1892–93 school year, the Tongzhou school had increased its enrollment to 62. In 1893, the schools in Tongzhou were officially divided into two units: the North China College and the Gordon Memorial Theological Seminary. Sheffield was appointed president of the college that year and described the "primary aim in the establishment of the school" as the "[multiplication of] Christian laborers to enter into the ever-expanding missionary work." He criticized the nearby Methodist Peking University for its lack of theological teaching and overly secular curriculum.

In the summer of 1895, two assailants, one a "crazed" local carpenter, attacked Sheffield, leaving him with more than 30 wounds. Sheffield recovered from the attack and subsequently petitioned for the release of one of his two attackers, as the other had already died in captivity. His petition and his benevolence towards his attacker were praised; some of his Chinese followers presented Sheffield with a tablet and two scrolls that contained an inscription commending his actions. These were later displayed at the North China College. In the autumn of that year, the North China College moved from its old grounds to a newly constructed campus south of Tongzhou; a house was built there for Sheffield.

Sheffield became president of the Educational Association of China, which had been founded earlier that decade by Protestant missionaries, in 1896. During his presidency, he authored the article "Christian Education: Its Place in Mission Work", published in the Chinese Recorder. In the article, he clarified his belief that although secular teaching was a necessity in schooling, it was equally necessary that said teachings never took precedence over Christian education. He also lamented that schools had become secular entities in the West with no religious ties. Sheffield was succeeded as president by Timothy Richard.

=== End of career and death ===
Sheffield had left China and returned to the United States when the Boxer Rebellion broke out; he traveled back to China in 1900 to aid in the total reconstruction of the North China College. After the school was rebuilt and resumed operation, cooperation between it and several other Beijing-area missions grew, leading to the creation of the North China Educational Union. Sheffield continued to serve as the president of the North China College until 1909, when he again returned to the United States. The following year, he once more returned to China and taught until he no longer could. In late 1912, his declining health forced him to resign from all of his positions; by that time, his mental faculties had become severely impaired and he struggled to respond to external stimuli. Sheffield died in Tongzhou on July 1, 1913, at the age of 71.

== Works ==
=== Literature ===
In addition to teaching, Sheffield also devoted himself to writing educational works in Chinese. He published the books Digest of Theology and Guide to Holiness in Chinese in 1876. In 1881, he published Universal History, a widely circulated textbook considered one of the first to detail in Chinese the history of the rest of the world. Sheffield continued to write Chinese textbooks on a variety of topics throughout his life: he published Church History in 1889, Systematic Theology in 1893, Political Economy in 1896, Principles of Ethics and Psychology in 1907, and Political Science in 1909.

At a convention of Christian missionaries in China referred to as the Shanghai Conference of 1890, a committee was established with the goal of creating a Chinese revision of the New Testament. Sheffield was appointed as the chairman of the committee; after years of translation by him and his colleagues, a finished revision was presented at another missionary conference in 1907. At the 1907 conference, Sheffield was appointed chairman of a similar committee aiming to create a revision of the Old Testament. After he finished translating his assigned section of the text, he resigned from the committee in 1912 due to his worsening health.

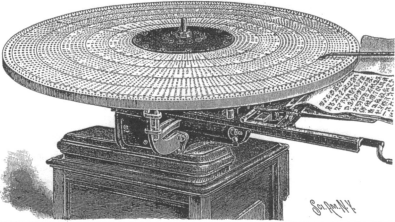
A drawing of Sheffield's typewriter published in Scientific American in 1899

=== Chinese typewriter ===
Another of Sheffield's talents was his skill in mechanics. He found it problematic that missionaries were forced to dictate their words to a local scribe and sought to create a machine that allowed them to instead type Chinese characters themselves. Sheffield began work on the machine in the 1880s, inspired by the quickness of Western typewriters and Chinese stamps, and finished in 1897. His apparatus, the first Chinese typewriter, was composed of a small table holding a large disk, from which 4,662 common Chinese characters could be selected by the operator. The operator would select one of the characters, which were sorted both by commonality and alphabetically based on their Wade-Giles romanization, by placing a long pointer needle over it; with their other hand, they would position the carriage underneath, before a small hammer imprinted the character onto the paper. Sheffield's design never reached mass production.

== Works cited ==
- "Devello Zelotes Sheffield, D.D.". General Biographical Catalogue of Auburn Theological Seminary, 1818-1918. Auburn Seminary Press. 1918. p. 161.
- Kallen, Miriam (February 1954). "Human Relations". Journal of Education. 136 (5). Boston University: 159–160.
- Latourette, Kenneth S. (1935). "Devello Zelotes Sheffield". Dictionary Of American Biography. Vol. 17. Charles Scribner's Sons. pp. 57–58.
- McCutcheon, James M. (December 1963). "The Missionary and the Diplomat in China: The Social Culture Response". Journal of Presbyterian History. 41 (4). Presbyterian Historical Society: 224–236. JSTOR 23325976.
- Mullaney, Thomas S. (October 2012). "The Moveable Typewriter: How Chinese Typists Developed Predictive Text during the Height of Maoism". Technology and Culture. 53 (4). Johns Hopkins University Press: 777–814. doi:10.1353/tech.2012.0132. JSTOR 41682742.
- Paterno, Roberto (October 14, 1970). "Devello Z. Sheffield and the Founding of the North China College". American Missionaries in China: Papers from Harvard Seminars. Harvard University Asia Center. pp. 42–92. doi:10.1163/9781684171521_004. ISBN 9781684171521.
- Report of the Missionary Conference Held in Shanghai, May 1890 (Report). General Conference of the Protestant Missionaries of China. May 1890.
- "Rev. Devello Z. Sheffield, D.D." The Missionary Herald. 109 (8). American Board of Commissioners for Foreign Missions: 350–352. August 1913.
- Smith, Arthur Henderson (September 1913). "In Memoriam.—Dr. Devello Z. Sheffield". Chinese Recorder and Missionary Journal. 44 (9). American Presbyterian Mission Press: 565–568.
- Tsu, Jing (January 17, 2023). Kingdom of Characters: The Language Revolution that Made China Modern. Riverhead Books. ISBN 9780735214736.
- Weber, Charles W. (April 1990). "Protestant Mission Education In Nineteenth Century China" (PDF). Evangelical Review of Theology. 14 (2). World Evangelical Fellowship: 40–53.
- Yeh, Wen-Hsin (November 15, 2000). The Alienated Academy: Culture and Politics in Republican China, 1919-1937. Harvard University Asia Center. ISBN 9780674002845.
