= Kingdom of Characters =

2022 book by Jing Tsu

Kingdom of Characters: The Language Revolution That Made China Modern
- 2023 paperback edition cover
- Author: Jing Tsu
- Genre: Nonfiction
- Published: 2022 (Riverhead Books)
- Publication date: 18 January 2022
- ISBN: 9780735214729

Kingdom of Characters: The Language Revolution That Made China Modern (Note: Published as Kingdom of Characters: A Tale of Language, Obsession, and Genius in Modern China in the United Kingdom.) is a nonfiction book written by Taiwanese American professor Jing Tsu. First published in January 2022, the book comprises seven chapters, each highlighting innovators in the modernization of the Chinese language. It was a finalist for the 2023 Pulitzer Prize for General Nonfiction and received nominations for the Baillie Gifford Prize for Non-Fiction, the British Academy Book Prize for Global Cultural Understanding, and the Cundill History Prize.

== Background ==
Kingdom of Characters is the third book authored by Jing Tsu, a professor of comparative literature and East Asian languages and literature at Yale University. Her previous two books, Failure, Nationalism, and Literature: The Making of Modern Chinese Identity, 1895-1937 and Sound and Script in Chinese Diaspora, also covered Chinese linguistic history. In an interview, Tsu stated that she had visited archives across multiple countries and continents during the course of her research. The book was initially published by Riverhead Books in January 2022; one year later, a paperback edition was released on 17 January.

== Summary ==
The book comprises seven chapters, ordered chronologically, each highlighting innovators in the modernization of the Chinese language. The first chapter focuses mainly on the efforts of Chinese linguist Wang Zhao to standardize Chinese pronunciation and introduce a Mandarin alphabet. The second chapter details Zhou Houkun's attempts to design a Chinese typewriter, and chapter three relates how Chinese statesman Wang Jingchun successfully lobbied for improved representation for Chinese in telegraphy. The fourth chapter covers multiple competing categorization systems for the titles of Chinese works. Chapter five covers Romanization and character simplification. The sixth and seventh chapters are dedicated to the entry of the Chinese language in the information age. All of the chapters are contextualized with the historical occurrences of the period, including the Century of Humiliation, World War II, the Chinese Communist Revolution, and the Cold War.

== Reception ==
In reviews for Kingdom of Characters, Tsu received praise for her storytelling and ability to convey information; reviewer Zuoyue Wang for Science called the book "lively and insightful", while The Telegraph's Christopher Harding describes it as "fascinating" and "necessarily complex". Kingdom of Characters was a finalist for the 2023 Pulitzer Prize for General Nonfiction, eventually losing to Robert Samuels and Toluse Olorunnipa's His Name Is George Floyd. It was also a nominee for multiple other nonfiction awards, including the Baillie Gifford Prize for Non-Fiction, the British Academy Book Prize for Global Cultural Understanding, and the Cundill History Prize. It was named a New York Times Notable Book in 2022 and one of The Washington Post's Best Nonfiction of 2022.

Conversely, Kingdom of Characters also received criticism from some reviewers, finding Tsu's narrative to be somewhat misrepresentative of history. In a mostly positive review, Gaston Dorren from The Guardian criticized the book's focus on less successful language reformers, as opposed to those who had more impact on Chinese's modernization. The New Yorker's Ian Buruma noted Tsu's failure to mention Japanese impact on Chinese reform, and questioned her claim that simplified characters were one of the major factors in China's growth in literacy. In a review published in the Journal of Chinese History, Joshua Fogel found the book to be "fascinating", but criticized its "triumphalism" of certain developments and "overly dramatic" style.
