= Haruo Shirane =

American academic

Academic background
- Education: Columbia University (BA, PhD)

Academic work
- Discipline: Japanese literature
- Institutions: Columbia University

Haruo Shirane (born 16 September 1951) is the Shincho Professor of Japanese Literature and Culture in the Department of East Asian Languages and Cultures and Chair of East Asian Languages and Cultures at Columbia University. At Columbia, Shirane is also affiliated with the Weatherhead East Asian Institute. He is an expert on Japanese literature, cultural history, and visual culture.

== Biography ==
Shirane received his B.A. and Ph.D. from Columbia University and joined Columbia's faculty in 1987. In 1996 he was appointed to the Shincho Professorship of Japanese Literature and Culture. In 2010, he was awarded the Ueno Satsuki Memorial Prize on Japanese Culture for his contributions to the study of Japanese culture. In 2022, he was named an honorary member of the Japan Academy.

== Selected publications ==
- Shirane, Haruo (2012). Japan and the Culture of the Four Seasons: Nature, Literature, and the Arts. New York: Columbia University Press.
- Shirane, Haruo, ed. (2012). Traditional Japanese Literature: An Anthology, Beginnings to 1600, (Abridged Edition). New York: Columbia University Press.
- Shirane, Haruo (2010), ed. The Demon at Agi Bridge and Other Japanese Tales, translated by Burton Watson. New York: Columbia University Press.
- Shirane, Haruo, ed. (2008). Envisioning The Tale of Genji. New York: Columbia University Press.
- Shirane, Haruo, ed. (2008). Early Modern Japanese Literature: An Anthology, 1600-1900 (Abridged Edition). New York: Columbia University Press.
- Shirane, Haruo, ed. (2007). Japanese Literature: An Anthology, Beginnings to 1600. New York: Columbia University Press.
- Shirane, Haruo, ed. (2006). The Tales of the Heike, translated by Burton Watson. New York: Columbia University Press.
- Shirane, Haruo (2005). Classical Japanese: A Grammar. New York: Columbia University Press.
- Shirane, Haruo, ed. (2002). Early Modern Japanese Literature: An Anthology, 1600-1900. New York: Columbia University Press.
- Shirane, Haruo (2001). Bashō no Fūkei, Bunka no kioku. Tokyo: Kadokawa Shoten.
- Shirane, Haruo, and Tomi Suzuki, eds. (2000). Inventing the Classics: Modernity, National Identity, and Japanese Literature. Stanford: Stanford University Press.
- Shirane, Haruo (1998). Traces of Dreams: Landscape, Cultural Memory, and the Poetry of Basho. Stanford: Stanford University Press.
- Shirane, Haruo (1992). Yume no ukihashi: Genji monogatari no shigaku. Tokyo: Chūō Kōron Sha.
- Shirane, Haruo (1987). The Bridge of Dreams: A Poetics of The Tale of Genji. Stanford: Stanford University Press.

== Affiliations ==
- Weatherhead East Asian Institute
- Columbia University

== Links ==
- Haruo Shirane's Columbia profile page
- Haruo Shirane's homepage
- Haruo Shirane
