= Stone Group =

Chinese holding company

- Native name: 四通控股有限公司
- Romanized name: Sìtōng Kònggǔ Yǒuxiàn Gōngsī
- Type: Holding company
- Industry: Electronics and others
- Incorporated: China
- Founded: May 16, 1984; 42 years ago
- Founders: Wan Runnan
- Headquarters: Zhongguancun, Haidian, Beijing, China
- Key people: Duan Yongji

The Stone Group (Chinese: 四通控股有限公司; pinyin: Sìtōng Kònggǔ Yǒuxiàn Gōngsī) is a holding company from Beijing, China. Its first iteration was the Stone Emerging Industries Company (四通新兴产业公司; Sìtōng Xīnxīng Chǎnyè Gōngsī), founded in 1984. The Stone Group grew to become one of the country's largest technology companies in the late 1980s and early 1990s, mostly through the sale of Chinese-language word processors. Rising competition and the spread of computers in the 1990s led to the group's decline, although it diversified into other industries.

The founder of the first Stone company was Wan Runnan, who was working at the Chinese Academy of Sciences. Wan desired to create an independent company and found others with similar ambitions. Economic reforms in the 1980s were creating new openings for businesses and the company was founded without state support or state oversight. The company soon found success in selling dot matrix printer software in partnership with the Japanese firm Mitsui. A new headquarters was established in Zhongguancun, and the company played an important role in turning Zhongguancun into a technology hub. In 1986, the Beijing Haidian Stone Group Company (later shortened to Stone Group Company) was founded to serve as a holding company for spin-off companies that had been established in other cities.

Sales of word processors saw the company rapidly expand. Stone was seen as an example of the success of China's economic reforms, being a company that succeeded due to market forces instead of government support. Stone became the country's largest non-government technology company in 1987. Stone was innovative in establishing service and maintenance centres for its products. The company also became an early adopter of philanthropy, and supported calls for political and economic reform.

Wan fled the country in 1989 due to his support for the Tiananmen Square protests. While the wider company faced no significant political repercussions, and even established a listed subsidiary in Hong Kong, the 1990s saw increasing market-based competition. The increasing adoption of personal computers sharply reduced demand for the company's word processors. While Stone Group attempted to diversify, it declined heading into the 2000s. The Hong Kong subsidiary was delisted in 2009.

== History ==
=== Foundation ===
The Stone company was founded in the early 1980s, part of a wave of non-state-controlled tech companies (as opposed to state-owned enterprises) that emerged after 1983. Its first president was Wan Runnan. While working at the Chinese Academy of Sciences (CAS), Wan was involved with training from IBM. Wan met Shen Guojun at the CAS, and the two began to plan the creation of a company independent of the CAS. They were later joined by Liu Haiping and Liu's colleague Gong Ke.

Wan's connections from Tsinghua University, where he had studied engineering, provided access to a loan of RMB 20,000 and office space within a factory. Stone Emerging Industries Company (四通新兴产业公司; Sìtōng Xīnxīng Chǎnyè Gōngsī) was officially registered with the Haidian district government on 16 May 1984. Many early senior staff were Tsinghua graduates. Wan's ambition was to "become China's IBM".

Stone was officially registered as a "collective" company rather than a private one. The collective was registered under Sijiqing township, whose mayor was the first chairman of the board. However, it was not a typical collective, as it did not report to a government body or danwei (work unit) or start with government investment. Instead, it was civilian-owned and civilian-run. At the time of Stone's founding, private enterprises where individual ownership exceeded 49% were limited to seven employees (this would change in 1988). Due to this structure, Stone could not legally transfer its assets into majority-private ownership.

The company's Chinese name derives from the Chinese idiom sìtōng bādá (四通八达), meaning "extend in all directions". The English name "Stone" was attributed by Wan as being related to another idiom (投石问路; tóushí wènlù), roughly "throwing stones to find the road", as well as the slogan "crossing the river by touching the stones" (摸著石頭過河; mōzhe shítouguò hé). Wan later also related the name to the idea that throwing a stone creates ripples, reflecting the impact the company would have on China. "Stone" was similar in pronunciation to "Sitong".

=== Early products ===
Word processors, such as this MS-2401 model, were behind much of Stone's success

One of Stone's early staff members, Wang Jizhi, had previously worked on outputting Chinese characters using a word processor, a significant challenge for Chinese technology at the time. After joining Stone, Wang met staff of the Japanese company Mitsui at an electronics exhibition. Mitsui was then a distributor for Brother Industries products. After eight days of work, Wang and some colleagues produced Chinese character software for Brother's dot matrix printers. Stone then took a loan from the Agricultural Bank of China to purchase Brother's printers, which the company then resold within China with their Chinese character software installed.

The success of the printer sales allowed Stone to move into their own store in Zhongguancun in 1985, and expand to over 170 staff. The company became an important initial contributor to the success of Zhongguancun as a technology centre, becoming known as one of the four major companies of the site along with Xintong, Kehai, and Jinghai (together referred to as the liǎng tōng liǎng hǎi (两通两海), or "two tōng two hǎi"). The same year, Stone fully paid back its initial starting loan.

In successfully selling a Chinese character printer, Stone overtook a state-owned enterprise that had been working on the same problem for longer but had not created a viable product. In its early years, Stone was seen as an example of a successful company created by market forces, rather than due to government intervention. The success of this kind of company was seen as a result of 1980s economic reforms, and as an example of a growing civil society in the country. The company actively tried to cultivate an independent corporate culture, including the importance of profit in evaluating success (replacing the "iron rice bowl" of guaranteed support with a "clay rice bowl" that needs to be maintained), the importance of individual attainment, and democratic decision-making. Pay was higher than in equivalent state-owned companies, and there was high staff satisfaction.

Stone did benefit from access to political elites and state assistance, although state aid also benefited commercial opponents in the growing electronics industry. Stone likely had some support from the Haidian district government, which benefited from the presence of successful companies. On the orders of Hu Qiaomu, Stone was investigated for financial irregularities by the Central Commission for Discipline Inspection. However, this possibly politically motivated investigation ended in 1986 without any action. In 1988, the government began to provide tech firms with tax benefits and bank loans, greater control over employees, and export incentives.

Within China, three other legally distinct sister companies had formed: two in Beijing and one in Xinjiang. Two more were founded in early 1986. In May 1986, the Beijing Haidian Stone Group Company was registered in Haidian. This group absorbed the smaller companies as subsidiaries, allowing for formal cooperation and thus for economies of scale. The name was shortened to Beijing Stone Group Company in 1987. Individual subsidiaries often remained specialised in specific products. That year, with government permission, the Stone Group created a finance company, improving its financial management. The group soon had branches in over 100 cities. A bridge near its headquarters, Sitong Bridge, was named after the company.

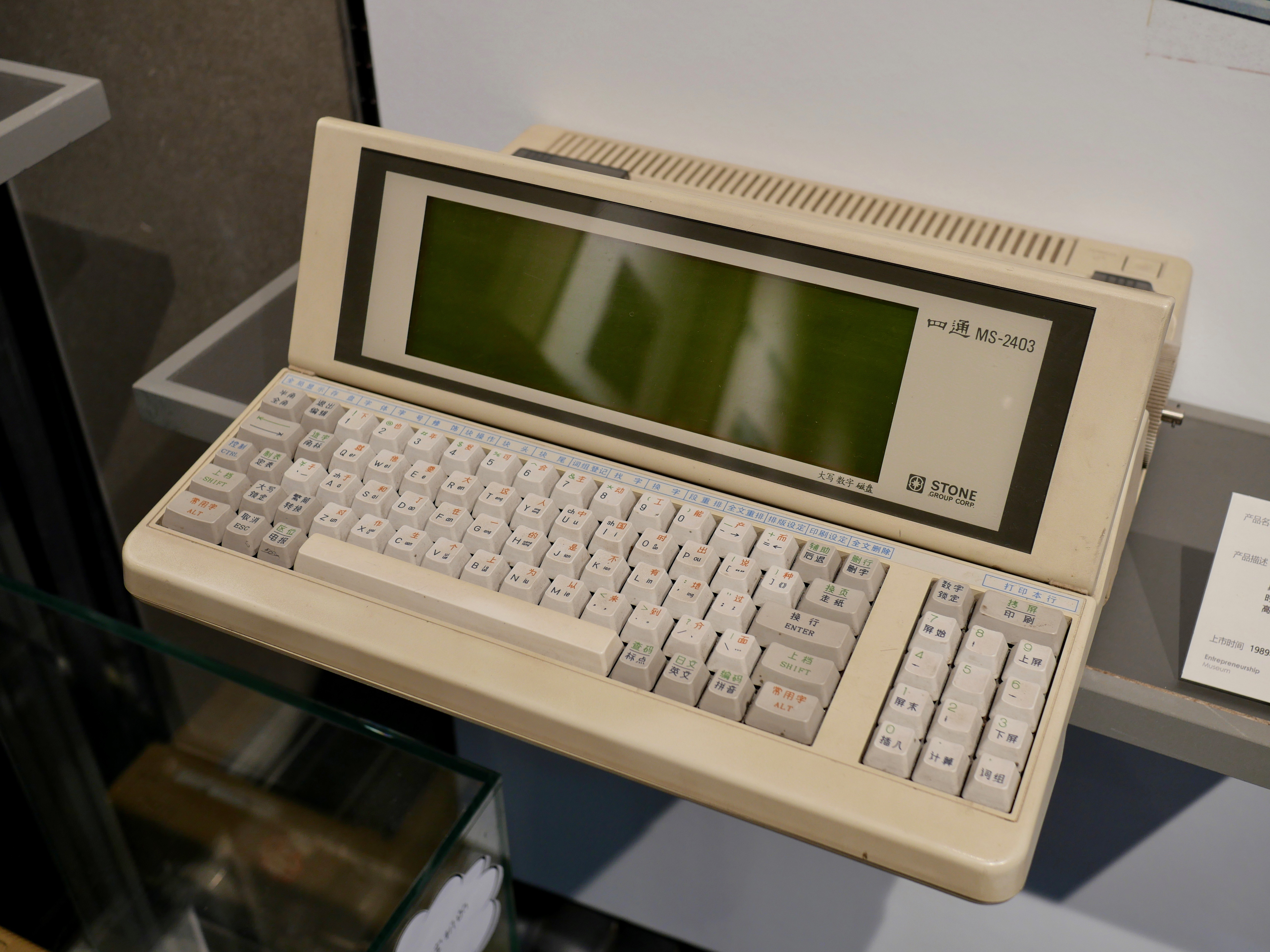
The MS-2403

Cooperation with Mitsui continued, and in 1986 a formal partnership was established. Mitsui viewed Stone as a vehicle to gain access to the Chinese market. Their jointly marketed word processor, with hardware from Mitsui and software from Stone, was called MS-2400, incorporating the initials of both companies. Stone used the MS-2400 to transition from a local company into a national one, combining unit sales with training and building service centres to provide support. Of the 7,000 units Stone sold in the first two months, 5,000 were sold in China and 2,000 were sold in Hong Kong, Singapore, and Japan. The combination of sales with service was new in the country, with Stone being one of the first companies to build this model. In May 1987, the two companies formed the Stone Office Equipment Technology Company (SOTEC) in Beijing to handle the assembly, sale, and service of their word processors. SOTEC received US$1 million in initial funding from Mitsui, but was 75% owned by the Stone Group. The MS-2401 model released later that year could be used with IBM computers, and could process 200 characters per minute.

Total revenue in 1986 was over RMB 100 million, making Stone China's second-largest computer company. In 1987, Stone became China's largest private technology company. In 1988, 80% of the word processors sold in China were from Stone, and the company had a revenue of RMB 830 million. While word processors remained Stone's main product, Stone began to produce some other products, as well as serving as a distributor for foreign products. Total revenue reached RMB 1 billion. To import foreign hardware, Stone was spending perhaps US$3 million per month on foreign exchange. In 1989, the group had expanded to include 19 subsidiaries. It had 1,900 total employees, mostly in China, but also in Hong Kong, Australia, and the United States.

Externally, Stone became a supporter of further economic reforms, going as far as to provide funding to a new Stone Social Development Institute (四通社会发展研究所; Sìtōng Shèhuì Fāzhǎn Yánjiū Suǒ) think tank. This body, co-founded by Wan in October 1988, called for constitutional reform. Stone also joined a number of business associations and engaged in philanthropy.

=== Departure of Wan ===
In early 1989, the Stone Group began restructuring its assets, shifting significant ownership to a new subsidiary. This was potentially an effort to create a fully private company, or an effort by Wan to increase his personal control over the company. These changes caused internal friction.

At the same time, many staff involved with the think tank, as well as Stone management, became involved with the 1989 Tiananmen Square protests. Stone donated some equipment to the protestors, and allowed them the use of company facilities. Wan became an advisor to some of the protestors, in part suggesting moderation and withdrawal from the square. Some Stone staff were arrested on 3 June. Following the suppression of the protests, Wan Runnan fled China along with two other managers. Subsequently, the company's headquarters were occupied by army and government officials investigating alleged connections between company employees and the protests.

Arrested staff were released in 1990, and the company suffered only two minor bank freezes. Wan's departure ended the internal friction caused by the 1989 restructuring. He was officially dismissed by the board of management, and was replaced by Shen. Shen publicly committed the company to refraining from political involvement, and established an internal company party committee. Government investigators blamed Stone's involvement with the protests directly on Wan, rather than on the wider company. The government also found that only 1.9% of staff were involved with the protests, a lower percentage than members of some government bodies. This treatment was possibly due in part to interventions from local officials in areas where Stone was an important economic contributor, including in Beijing.

While company sales decreased in 1989, by 1990 they were higher than in 1988. While banks temporarily withdrew from cooperation with the company in 1989, and one minicomputer initiative was stalled, product sales held up outside of Beijing. Production of the MS-2403, which could switch between traditional and simplified Chinese characters and was released in May 1989, was continued in cooperation with Mitsui. While the company no longer advocated for political reform, it retained interest in economic reform and continued its membership in business associations. It also continued to engage in philanthropy, which became more common among non-government companies in the 1990s.

=== Increased competition ===
A Stone-produced Sports Lottery Terminal from the 1990s

The early 1990s brought increased foreign competition due to government economic reforms initiated to gain China's membership of the General Agreement on Tariffs and Trade. Domestic competition also increased, with the government providing more support to state-owned enterprises. Stone maintained its position as the country's largest computer company through 1991. However, rising competition led to some employees leaving. As many Stone subsidiaries were also collectives and thus ultimately owned by local government, their managers were incentivised to stock competing products as well as Stone products to boost short-term profits, weakening the overall success of the parent company. Increasing pressures and internal disputes between headquarters and the subsidiaries resulted in Shen being replaced by Duan Yongji in late 1991. Shen remained chair of the board, and tensions remained between the two. In June 1992, Duan himself was replaced while he was visiting Japan. However, he returned and convinced the board to rescind this decision.

Duan pursued a policy of diversification and enhanced cooperation with foreign companies. Stone initially sought to be a Chinese distributor for foreign products, with the eventual aim of becoming a domestic manufacturer for those products. In addition to their continuing cooperation with Mitsui, other partners included Fujitsu, Compaq, and Mitsubishi Electric. A Stone, Mitsui, and Fujitsu joint venture founded in October 1991 became the primary arm of Stone's printer business. Also in 1991, Stone started producing cash registers that could automatically calculate value-added tax. In August 1993, with Chinese government permission, the Stone Group's Hong Kong subsidiary was listed on the Hong Kong Stock Exchange (becoming what is referred to as a "red chip" company). Shares in this subsidiary were given to both management and employees, creating a more direct link between company success and individual earnings. The Stone Group retained 58% ownership in the subsidiary, and raised over HKD 189 million.

Share prices increased 360% in the year following the listing. By 1994, group sales had reached RMB 3.5 billion. The company had diversified into other electronic technologies, as well as into vitamins, chocolate, furniture, real estate, finance, and taxis. It total, the group produced over 20,000 products. By 1997, the Stone Group included 52 subsidiaries, of which 18 were joint ventures with foreign partners.

The continued success of Stone was viewed internally as being due to its origin as a market-orientated company, which allowed it to continue even when it no longer received political support from individuals such as Hu Yaobang and Zhao Ziyang (Ziyang fell out of political favour after Tiananmen). Stone joined some of the government-initiated Golden projects, which aimed to improve the country's use of technology. However, it remained autonomous, and lacked access to some state company benefits such as cheap foreign exchange. In 1993, the company name was shortened again to just Stone Group Company.

In December 1993, Stone funded entrepreneur Wang Zhidong's founding of the Stone Rich Sight Information Technology Company. This joint venture focused on developing Chinese language software, with Stone being given some equity in the new company. In March 1994, this company produced a Chinese-language version of Microsoft Windows named WinMATE (later RichWIN). In 1995, Stone connected Wang with venture capitalists in Silicon Valley. In May 1996, Wang founded SRSnet.com, a Chinese-language news and service website that aimed to seize opportunities in the still-new Internet. In 1997, the company was hired by the Chinese government to help develop its Internet software. In 1999, it was merged with an external company to form the Sina Corporation. Duan became one of Sina's board members. Stone began to sell off its 20% stake in 2003, holding just 5% by 2005 and losing its position as Sina's largest shareholder.

=== Decline ===
The former headquarters of the Stone Group in Haidian

The spread of personal computers in the 1990s significantly reduced demand for word processors. In 1993, word processors alone made up 70% of sales and 90% of profits; by 1995, this had fallen to only 11% of sales, and that year profits dropped for the first time that decade, although they recovered somewhat in 1996, in part due to a weakening Japanese yen. The group declined after that point. The Hong Kong subsidiary's share price decreased from RMB 2.2 in 1994 to just a few cents in 1996.

In July 1999, the Sitong Group underwent China's first management buyout. A new company was founded, officially Beijing Sitong Investment Company (北京四通投资有限公司; Běijīng Sìtōng Tóuzī Yǒuxiàn Gōngsī), but colloquially known as New Sitong (新四通; Xīn Sìtōng). Sitong management owned 51% of New Sitong, while a 49% was held by the Sitong Group. This ended the unusual ownership situation caused by the group's original founding as a collective. Using 51 million RMB raised from management and employees, New Sitong gradually bought out the Sitong Group's good assets.

In 2004, the group sought to pivot towards the Internet and pharmaceuticals. Many of the attempts to diversify ultimately failed. The Hong Kong subsidiary was delisted from the Hong Kong Stock Exchange on 6 November 2009.
