= Chinese typewriter =

Typewriter that can type Chinese script

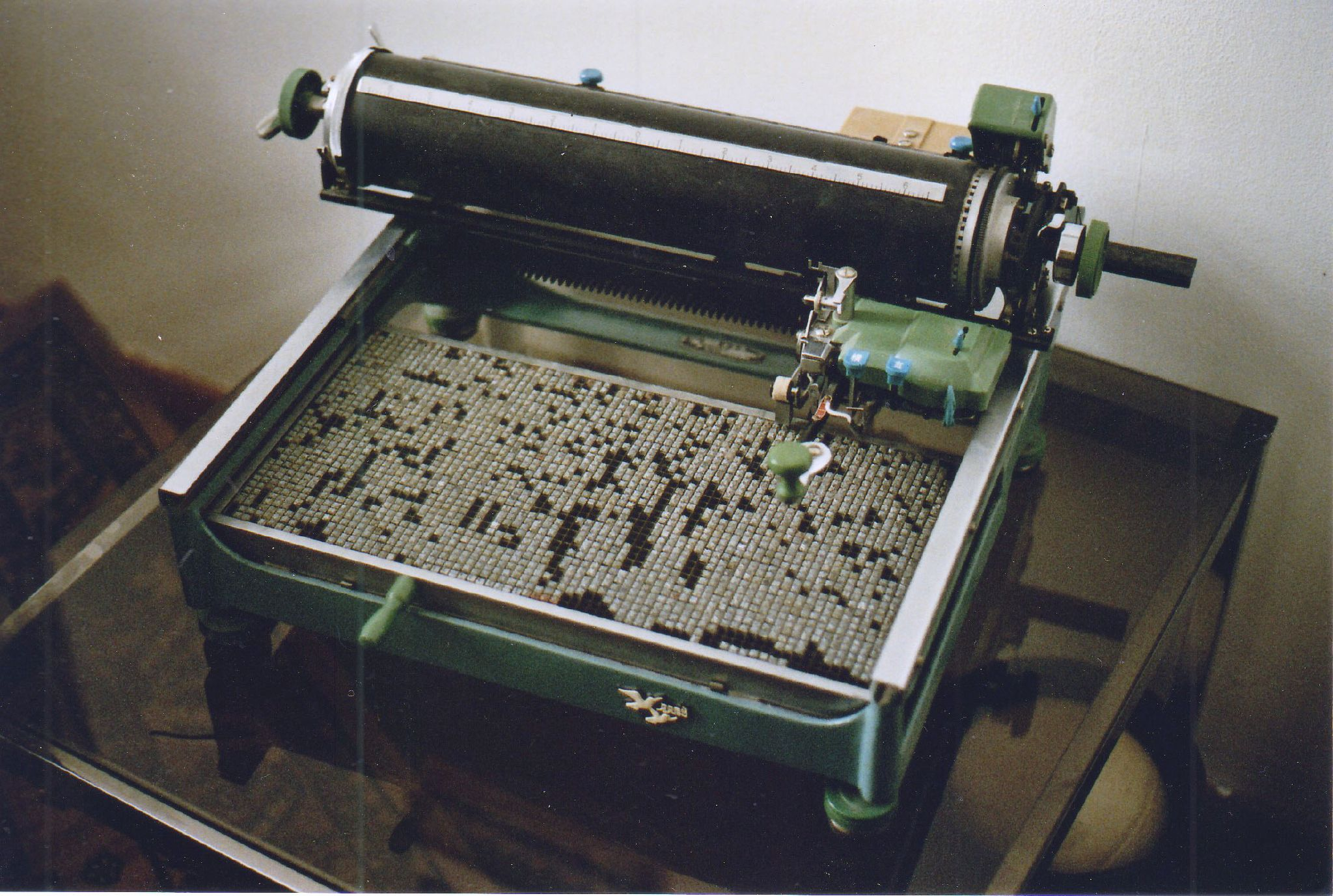
A Double Pigeon mechanical typewriter for Chinese from the 1970s. The characters can be assorted on the board and can be picked separately and then typed.

Typewriters that can type Chinese characters were invented in the early 20th century. Written Chinese is a logographic writing system, and facilitating the use of thousands of Chinese characters requires more complex engineering than for a writing system derived from the Latin alphabet, which may require only tens of glyphs. In the Kangxi Dictionary, there are over 40,000 Chinese characters, but only 423 distinct syllabic sounds, not counting tones. An ordinary Chinese printing office uses 6,000 characters. Models began to be mass-produced in the 1920s. Many early models were manufactured by Japanese companies, following the invention of the Japanese typewriter by Kyota Sugimoto, which used kanji adopted from the Chinese writing system. At least sixty different models of Chinese typewriter have been produced, ranging from sizable mechanical models to electronic word processors.

== Historical Context ==
Before the development of Hanyu Pinyin, many attempts at Chinese typewriting relied on the structure of Chinese characters themselves. These systems either used complete characters or decomposed characters into strokes and stroke combinations, an approach often described as "shape-based." By contrast, many modern writing and encoding systems, including Morse code, braille, and ASCII, were originally developed for alphabetic languages rather than character-based writing systems such as Chinese. In response to the difficulty of inputting Chinese characters on Western, Latin-alphabet-based typewriters, some reformers argued that Chinese should adopt an alphabetic writing system. Qian Xuantong, a professor of literature at Peking University, took a more radical position. In his article "China's Script Problem From Now On," published in New Youth magazine, Qian wrote "first we must abolish Chinese characters," arguing that this was necessary in order to "get rid of the average person's childish, naïve, and barbaric ways of thinking".

== Early prototype ==
In 1897, Devello Z. Sheffield, an American missionary in China, developed an early prototype of a Chinese typewriter. Sheffield's motivation was to allow foreigners such as himself to express ideas directly in written Chinese, rather than relying on Chinese translators or scribes, whose mediation could alter the intended meaning or omit information. His design included 4,662 Chinese characters, which he arranged according to frequency of use on a rotating circular table. The characters were divided into three categories: "very common," "common," and less common characters. Sheffield also made selective choices based on his missionary background, including the characters for Jesus, yesu (耶稣), even though su (稣) was uncommon outside religious contexts. Although it is unclear whether Sheffield's machine was ever commercially manufactured, it provided an early prototype for addressing the mechanical problem of Chinese typewriting.

== Zhou–Shu design ==
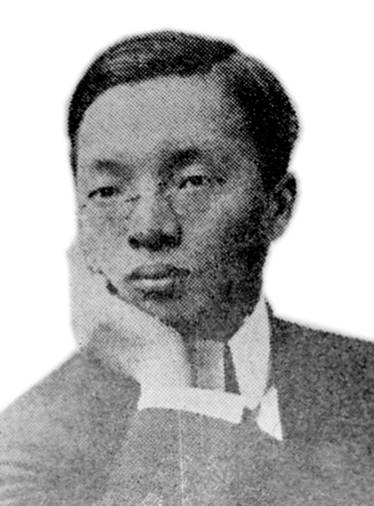
Zhou Houkun, co-inventor of the first mass-produced Chinese typewriter

A mechanical engineer from Wuxi, Jiangsu, named Zhou Houkun (Hou-Kun Chow; 周厚坤; b. 1887) co-invented the first mass-produced Chinese typewriter. As a student of the Massachusetts Institute of Technology (MIT), Zhou first thought about the practicality of a Chinese typewriter while inspecting American models in Boston. His initial efforts were hindered by a lack of technical assistance in Shanghai.

Zhou considered it impossible to build a Chinese typewriter with separate keys for each character. Instead, his design involved a revolving cylinder that contained the characters ordered by radical and stroke count, like in a Chinese dictionary. Zhou completed an initial prototype in 1914, and by 1916 he had attracted interest from the media and potential manufacturers. However, his design was heavy at 18 kg (40 lb), which was later reduced to about 14 kg (31 lb). The Commercial Press had obtained the rights to his machine and possession of the prototype by 1919. Following improvements to the design by an engineer working for the Commercial Press named Shu Changyu (舒昌鈺), which included replacing the cylinder with a flat bed customizable by typists, the model entered mass production in 1919.

Zhou expected his typewriter to be used in Chinese offices where multiple copies of documents would have to be made, and by Chinese living in foreign countries without access to skilled writers of Chinese.

== IBM and Kao's electric design ==
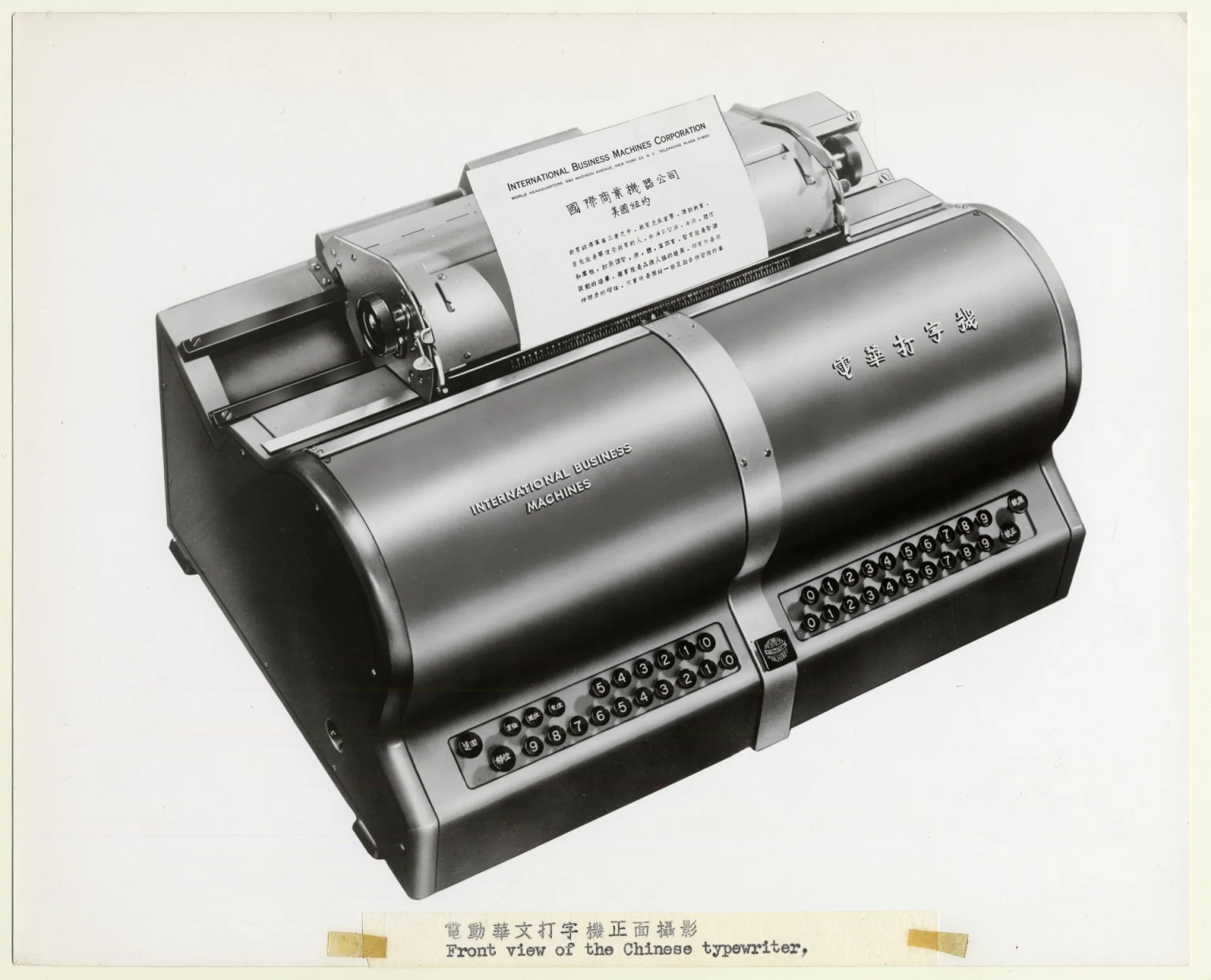
Kao Chung-Chin's electric typewriter

On 28 June 1944, IBM engineer Chung-Chin Kao (高仲芹; b. 1906) applied for a patent from the United States Patent and Trademark Office for his invention, the first electric Chinese typewriter, and received US patent number 2412777 on 17 December 1946. The typewriter employed 36 keys divided into four banks: the first was numbered 0 through 5, and the other three were numbered 0 through 9. To type a character, the operator simultaneously pressed one key from each bank. Each four-digit combination corresponded to one of 5,400 Chinese characters, punctuation marks, numerals, letters of the English alphabet and other symbols etched onto a revolving drum which had a diameter of seven inches and a length of 11 inches. The drum made a complete revolution once per second, allowing the operator to achieve a maximum typing speed of 45 words per minute.

Kao's typewriter received extensive attention in its debut in a 1947 tour of China. Accompanied by Lois Lew, one of the few Chinese-speaking typists at the time, Kao was greeted by the mayor of Shanghai in 1947 before their first series of demonstrations at the IBM Chinese headquarters, and by government officials in Nanjing where 3,000 people watched a demonstration. Kao's typewriter was also featured in a 1947 documentary with other office business machines.

The IBM Chinese typewriter was not successfully put on the market because of its impractical nature. As a July 15, 1946, Time article wrote, "it takes two months for an operator to learn to write simple sentences, four months to achieve the machine's top speed—45 words a minute (par for a fast typist in English: 120 words)." The economic impact of the 1949 Communist takeover of China also worsened sales.

== Wanneng and Double Pigeon models ==
Chinese typewriters made in Japan entered the market in the 1920s, with the Wanneng (万能) brand, introduced by the Nippon Typewriter Company in 1940 during the Second Sino-Japanese War, becoming the de facto standard. After Japan's defeat and the subsequent nationalization of typewriter companies by the Communist government, locally made models based on the Wanneng continued to dominate the market, particularly the Double Pigeon (双鸽; Shuānggē).

The Double Pigeon typewriter was the most popular typewriter during the Mao era. It used a rectangular tray bed containing 2,450 character slugs. To type, the operator selected a character slug from the tray and struck it against an ink ribbon to print the character onto paper. The process involved inserting paper into the cylinder, choosing the paper's orientation, locating the desired character, and aligning the hammer with the selected slug. Operating the machine required close hand-eye coordination. Typists also had to adjust the force of each strike according to the complexity of the character, since slugs for characters with more strokes could require different pressure to produce a clear impression without damaging the paper. The arrangement of characters in the tray bed could also be customized according to the typist's preferences or the specific vocabulary needed in a workplace context.

In practice, the tray bed was arranged neither like a dictionary nor strictly according to stroke count or pronunciation. Instead, characters could be positioned according to their likelihood of appearing together in common words or phrases. This flexibility allowed skilled operators of the Double Pigeon typewriter to type two or three times faster than an average typist using a less optimized arrangement. Such efficiency depended on the typist's accumulated work experience and on continual adjustment of the tray according to specific needs.

The arrangement of character slugs may have also reflected the social and political context in which the machine was used. For example, words frequently used in a police office might differ from those commonly used in a bank. Similarly, the frequency of the character Mao (毛), the surname of Mao Zedong, increased significantly in the 1930s–1950s because of its political importance. The standardized political phrases of the Mao era further encouraged certain convenient and efficient arrangements of character slugs. In this way, Chinese typewriting produced a distinctive form of human-machine interaction: typists adjusted the machine's physical layout for convenience, and these adjustments in turn improved the efficiency of the typewriter itself.

== MingKwai design ==
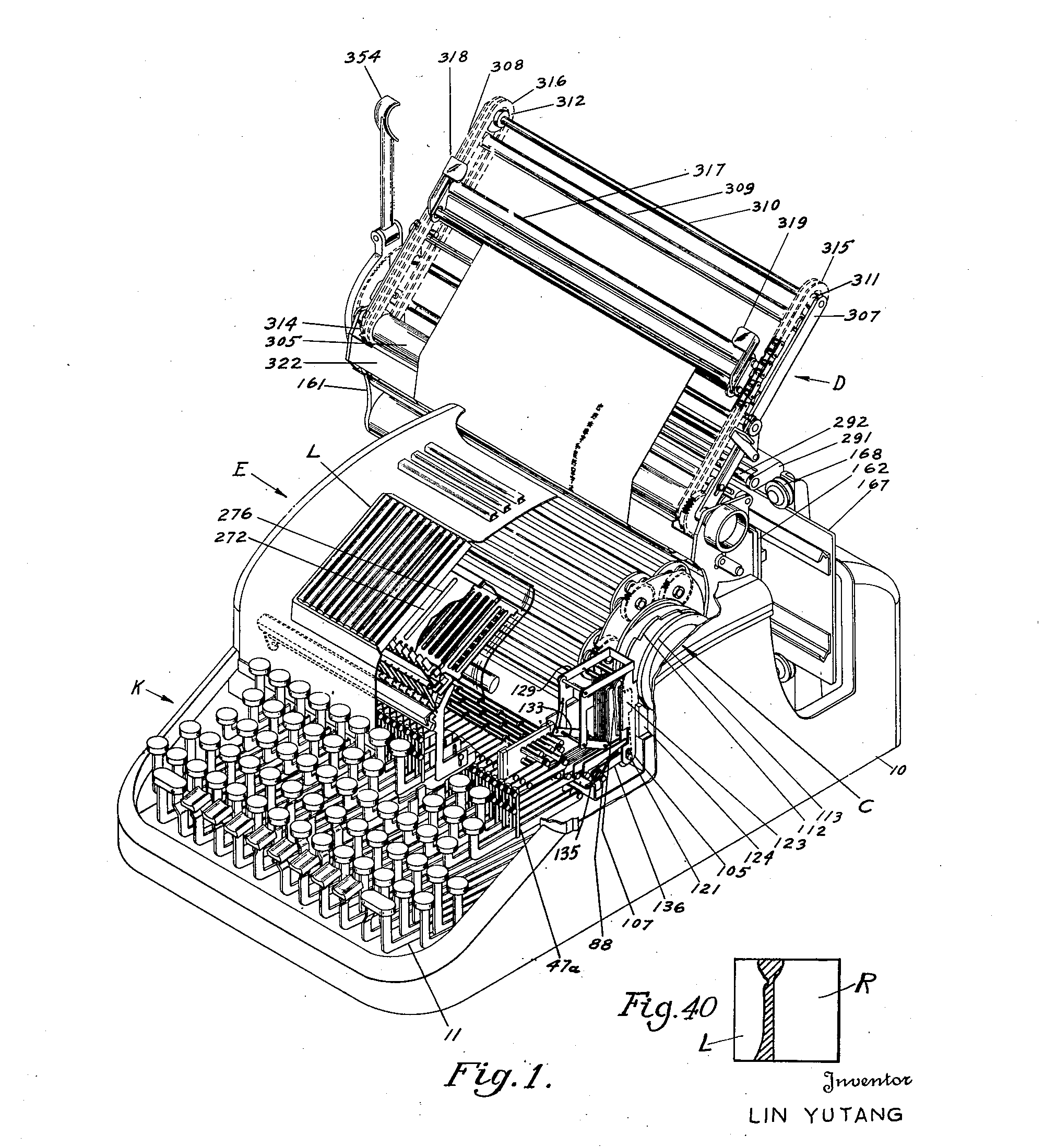
Lin Yutang's MingKwai typewriter, as illustrated in its patent application

The inventor, linguist, and author Lin Yutang (1895–1976) filed a patent application with the United States Patent and Trademark Office for an electric typewriter for Chinese on 17 April 1946, which was granted on 14 October 1952. Lin called his typewriter design "MingKwai", derived from the characters 明 (míng) and 快 (kuài), meaning 'clear' and 'quick' respectively.

Lin had a prototype machine custom built by the Carl E. Krum Company, a small engineering-design consulting firm with an office in New York City. That multilingual typewriter was the size of a conventional office typewriter of the 1940s. It measured 36 cm × 46 cm × 23 cm (14.2 in × 18.1 in × 9.1 in). The typefaces fit on a drum. A "magic eye" was mounted in the center of the keyboard which magnifies and allows the typist to review a selected character. Characters are selected by pressing two keys to choose a desired character, which is arranged according to the system Lin devised for his Chinese-language dictionary, which lexicographically orders characters using thirty geometric shapes or strokes as tokens, akin to letters in an alphabet. This system broke with the long-standing system of radicals and stroke order as a means of indexing characters. The selected Chinese character appeared in the magic eye for preview, the typist then pressed a "master" key, similar to today's computer function key. The typewriter could create 90,000 distinct characters using either one or two of six character-containing rollers, which in combination has 7,000 full characters and 1,400 character radicals or partial characters.

Lin's typewriter was not produced commercially. When Lin's daughter Lin Tai-yi was to demonstrate use of the machine to executives of the Remington Typewriter Company, they could not make it work. Though the machine was fixed for a press conference the next day, no further progress was made in attracting potential manufacturers. Lin had by then acquired considerable debt.

The Mergenthaler Linotype Company bought the rights for the typewriter, as well as the prototype, from Lin in 1948. The Cold War had begun and the United States and the Soviet Union were racing to research cryptography and machine translation. The United States Air Force acquired the keyboard to study machine translation and disk storage for rapid access to large quantities of information. The Air Force then handed the keyboard to Gilbert W. King, the director of research at IBM. King moved to Itek and authored a seminal scientific paper on machine translation. He also unveiled the Sinowriter, a device for converting Chinese-character texts into machine input codes for processing Chinese into English.

The sole known prototype was stored at Mergenthaler for over a decade until it was assumed lost when the company moved out of New York City. Tai-yi attempted to recover the prototype during a trip to the United States in the 1960s, but was only able to make contact with a Mergenthaler engineer three months after the move. Unknown to the wider world, Mergenthaler toolmaker Douglas Jung had kept the typewriter in his home basement, where it remained after his death in 2004. On 23 January 2025, the typewriter resurfaced in a social media post by Nelson Felix, husband of Jung's granddaughter Jennifer Felix, who found the prototype while he was cleaning out the basement and was unaware of its significance. The post generated excitement and disbelief at the discovery, with many suggestions and offers to buy, auction, or donate the prototype. Jennifer corresponded with Stanford University history professor Thomas S. Mullaney, who had previously written a book with a chapter dedicated to the MingKwai. Following the correspondence, Stanford University Libraries announced on 2 May 2025 that it had acquired the prototype with the help of a private donor.

== Cultural and technological impact ==
According to Thomas S. Mullaney, it is possible that development of modern Chinese typewriters in the 1960s and 1970s influenced the development of modern computer word processors and even affected the development of computers themselves. In the 1950s, typists came to rearrange the character layout from the standard dictionary layout to groups of common words and phrases. Chinese typewriter engineers were trying to make the most common characters accessible at the fastest speed possible by autocompletion, a technique used today in input methods for many languages, not only Chinese. This arrangement was called the 'associative' (联想; 聯想; liánxiǎng) layout, similar to predictive text, and sped typing speeds from about 20 words per minute to around 80.

The Chinese typewriter has become a metaphor for absurdity, complexity and backwardness in Western popular culture. One such example is MC Hammer's dance move named after the Chinese typewriter in the music video for "U Can't Touch This". The move, with its fast-paced and large gestures, supposedly resembles a person working on a huge, complex typewriter.

The Chinese typewriter was ultimately eclipsed and made redundant with the introduction of computerized word processing, pioneered by engineer and dissident Wan Runnan and his partners when they formed the Stone Emerging Industries Company in 1984 in Zhongguancun, China's "Silicon Valley". The last Chinese typewriters were completed around 1991. Stone developed software based on Alps Electric custom-made 8088 based hardware with a dot matrix printer from Brother Industries, distributed by Mitsui, to print Chinese characters, and released the system as the MS-2400.
