= Madeleine Zelin =

American professor

- Occupation: Historian

Academic background
- Education: Cornell University (BA); University of California at Berkeley (PhD)

Academic work
- Discipline: History
- Sub-discipline: History of China
- Institutions: Columbia University
- Doctoral students: Sarah C. M. Paine

Madeleine Zelin is Dean Lung Professor of Chinese Studies at Columbia University. At Columbia, Zelin is affiliated with the Weatherhead East Asian Institute, the Department of History, the Department of East Asian Languages and Cultures, the Institute for Social and Economic Research and Policy, and the Columbia Law School.

== Biography ==
Zelin received her B.A. from Cornell University in 1970 and her Ph.D. from the University of California at Berkeley in 1979. In 1979, she joined the faculty of Columbia University, where she teaches Chinese legal and economic history and the history of Chinese social movements. In the West, Zelin pioneered the study of Chinese legal and economic history.

In 2005, Zelin published The Merchants of Zigong: Industrial Entrepreneurship in Early Modern China (Columbia University Press), a study of the indigenous roots of Chinese economic culture and business practice. The book was awarded the 2006 Allan Sharlin Memorial Prize of the Social Science History Association, the 2006 Fairbank Prize of the American Historical Association, and the 2007 Humanities Book Prize of the International Convention on Asian Studies. She has also authored The Magistrate’s Tael: Rationalizing Fiscal Reform in Eighteenth-Century Ch'ing China (University of California Press, 1984), co-edited Contract and Property Rights in Early Modern China, (Stanford University Press, 2004), co-edited Nation and Beyond: Chinese History in Late Imperial and Modern Times (University of California Press, 2006), and translated Mao Dun's novel Rainbow (University of California Press, 1992).

Thomas Mullaney received his Ph.D. under Zelin's supervision in 2006.

== Selected publications ==
- Zelin, Madeleine (1984). The Magistrate's Tael: Rationalizing Fiscal Reform in Eighteenth Century Ch'ing China. Berkeley: University of California Press. ISBN 978-0520049307
- Zelin, Madeleine, Jonathan Ocko, and Robert Gardella, eds. (2004). Contract and Property Rights in Early Modern China Stanford: Stanford University Press. ISBN 9780804746397
- Zelin, Madeleine (2005). The Merchants of Zigong: Industrial Entrepreneurship in Early Modern China. New York: Columbia University Press. ISBN 9780231509763
- Zelin, Madeleine, and Billy K.L. So, eds. (2013). New Narratives of Urban Space in Republican Chinese Cities: Emerging Social, Legal and Governance Orders. Leiden: Brill Publishers. ISBN 9789004249905

As translator:

- Mao Dun (1992). Rainbow, trans. Madeleine Zelin. Berkeley: University of California Press. ISBN 978-0520073289

== Affiliations ==
- Weatherhead East Asian Institute at Columbia University
- Department of History, Columbia University
- Department of East Asian Languages and Cultures, Columbia University
- Columbia Law School
- Institute for Social and Economic Research and Policy at Columbia University
- Columbia University
