= Then the War: and Selected Poems, 2007–2020 =

2022 poem collection by Carl Phillips

- Official Cover Page for Then the War: and Selected Poems, 2007–2020
- Author: Carl Phillips
- Genre: Poetry
- Publisher: Farrar, Straus and Giroux
- Publication date: 2022
- Publication place: United States of America
- ISBN: 9780374603762

Then the War: and Selected Poems, 2007–2020 is a collection of poems by Carl Phillips published in 2022 by Farrar, Straus and Giroux. The collection won the 2023 Pulitzer Prize for Poetry. The collection begins with new poems but includes portions of his lyric memoir, Among the Trees. The book also contains selections from several of Phillip's former poetry collections, specifically Speak Low, Double Shadow, Silverchest, Reconnaissance, Wild is the Wind, Pale Colors in a Tall Field, Star Map with Action Figures.

== Description ==
The poems of the collection, outside of the lyric-prose memoir section, can be described as a mix of free verse and prose poems. The collection circles themes of sexuality and nature.

== Reception ==
Then the War has received almost universal praise from book reviewers.
