= Weatherhead East Asian Institute =

Community of scholars at Columbia University

Coordinates: 40.80779°N 73.95967°W

- Named after: Richard W. Weatherhead
- Formation: 1949
- Location: New York City, New York, U.S.
- Director: Lien-Hang T. Nguyen
- Parent organization: Columbia University
- Website: weai.columbia.edu

The Weatherhead East Asian Institute (WEAI) at Columbia University is a community of scholars affiliated with Columbia's schools. Its mission is to train new generations of experts on East Asian topics in the humanities, social sciences, and the professions and to enhance understanding of East Asia in the wider community. Since its establishment in 1949 as the East Asian Institute, the WEAI has been the center for modern and contemporary East Asia research, studies, and publication at Columbia, covering China, Japan, Taiwan, Hong Kong, Korea, Mongolia (Inner Asia), Tibet, and, increasingly, the countries of Southeast Asia.

The Weatherhead East Asian Institute (WEAI) and East Asian Studies at Columbia has been recognized by a wide variety of funding sources, including the United States Department of Education, which, since 1960, has designated Columbia as an East Asian National Resource Center.

The Weatherhead endowment supports a significant expansion of Institute programs, including the creation of postdoctoral fellowships, visiting professorships, a faculty research program, graduate training grants, student internships, a resident fellows program, and symposiums and workshops. The endowment will also support graduate fellowships for students pursuing advanced degrees in East Asian-related fields.

== M.A. Program ==
The Weatherhead East Asian Institute administers the Master of Arts in Regional Studies—East Asia (MARSEA) program at Columbia. The MARSEA program, completed in two full-time semesters, is tailored to meet the needs of individuals entering professional careers, mid-career professionals, students preparing for entry into doctoral programs, and those pursuing a professional degree, such as the J.D. or M.B.A., who want to gain social science expertise in the modern politics, international relations, modern history, and cultural and social formations of the region with a country focus.

== Publications ==
The institute is also responsible for three major publication series. The first, Studies of the Weatherhead East Asian Institute, was inaugurated in 1962 to bring to public attention the results of significant new research on modern and contemporary East Asia. The books in this series are published by academic and trade presses and represent scholars of East Asia from around the world. The second series, Weatherhead Books on Asia, is published by Columbia University Press and comprises high-quality translations of works in Asian languages for scholars, students, and the interested general reader. The third series, Asia Perspectives: New Horizons in Asian History, Society and Culture, is also published by Columbia University Press and includes books on Asian subjects that cross the usual boundary between scholarly monographs and more encompassing general works for the classroom and the educated general reader.

== Weatherhead Foundation ==
The Weatherhead Foundation, which has supported the East Asian Institute since 1980, was founded by A. J. Weatherhead, Jr. in 1953 and is currently headed by his son, A. J. Weatherhead, III. The Weatherhead Fund at Columbia is named in honor of another of the founder's sons, the late Richard W. Weatherhead, who earned an M.A. in history from Columbia, followed by a Ph.D. in 1966.

The family foundation concentrates on endowments for higher education. Since its establishment, it has supported Case Western Reserve University, Columbia University, Harvard University, the University of Texas at Houston, and Tulane University."

== Select institute faculty and scholars ==
- Gerald Curtis
- Carol Gluck
- Duncan McCargo
- Andrew J. Nathan
- Haruo Shirane
- Madeleine Zelin
