= Carl Phillips =

American writer and poet (born 1959)

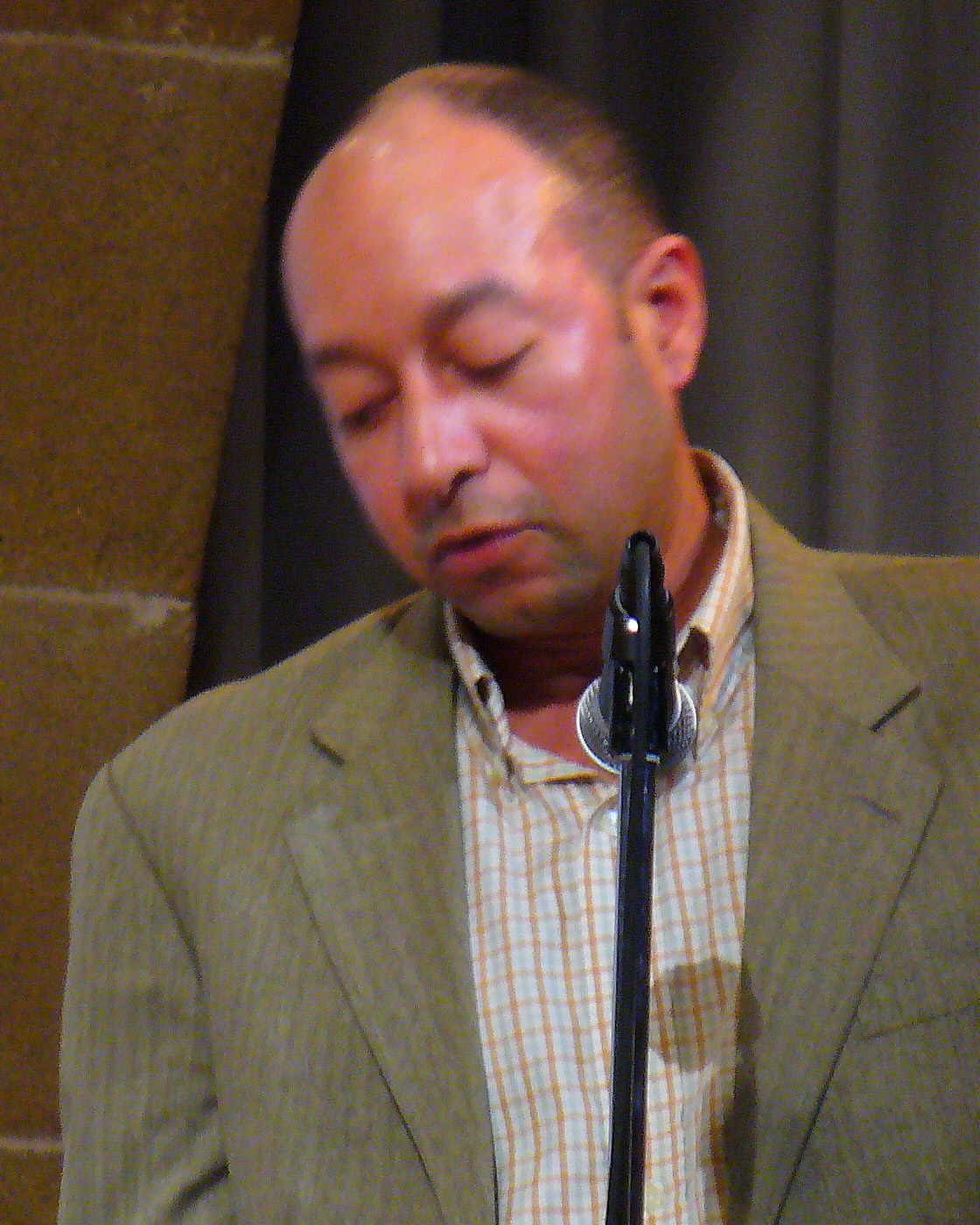
- Born: July 23, 1959 (age 67)
- Education: Harvard University (BA); University of Massachusetts, Amherst (MA); Boston University (MA)
- Employer: Washington University in St. Louis
- Partner(s): Doug Macomber (1992–2007); Reston Allen (2013–present)

Carl Phillips (born 23 July 1959) is an American writer and poet. He is professor emeritus of English at Washington University in St. Louis. In 2023, he was awarded a Pulitzer Prize for Poetry for his Then the War: And Selected Poems, 2007-2020.

== Early life ==
Phillips was born in Everett, Washington. He was born a child of a military family, moving year-by-year until finally settling in his high-school years on Cape Cod, Massachusetts. A graduate of Harvard University, the University of Massachusetts Amherst, and Boston University, Phillips taught high-school Latin for eight years.

== Works ==
His first collection of poems, In the Blood, won the 1992 Samuel French Morse Poetry Prize, and his second book, Cortège, was nominated for a 1995 National Book Critics Circle Award. His Pastoral won the 2001 Lambda Literary Award for Poetry. Phillips' work has been published in The Yale Review, The Atlantic Monthly, The New Yorker and The Paris Review. He was named a Witter Bynner Fellowship in 1998 and in 2006, he was named the recipient of the Fellowship of the Academy of American Poets, given in memory of James Merrill.

In 2002, Phillips received the Kingsley Tufts Poetry Award, for The Tether. In 2004, he published All It Takes. He won the Thom Gunn Award in 2005 for The Rest of Love.

His poems, which include themes of spirituality, sexuality, mortality, and faith, are featured in American Alphabets: 25 Contemporary Poets (2006) and many other anthologies.

In 2015, Phillips released his 13th collection of poems, Reconnaissance, which was nominated for an NAACP Image Award for Best Poetry and appeared on the Top Books list from Canada's The Globe and Mail. Phillips was also a featured poet in the "Picture and a Poem" series for T: The New York Times Style Magazine in December 2015. Reconnaissance won the Lambda Literary Award and the PEN Center USA Award.

Philips latest book to be published, Then the War: And Selected Poems (2022), won the Pulitzer Prize in 2023. Then the War is described by his publisher as "luminous testimony to the power of self-reckoning and to Carl Phillips as an ever-changing, necessary voice in contemporary poetry".

== Recognition ==
Phillips is a four-time finalist for the National Book Award. He received the 2002 Kingsley Tufts Award and the 2021 Jackson Poetry Prize. He was also the named a winner of the 2023 Pulitzer Prize in Poetry.

Phillips was a judge for the 2010 Griffin Poetry Prize. In April 2010, he was named as the new judge of the Yale Series of Younger Poets, replacing Louise Glück. In 2011, he was appointed to the judging panel for The Kingsley and Kate Tufts Poetry Awards. His collection of poetry, Double Shadow, was a finalist for the 2011 National Book Award for poetry. Double Shadow won the 2011 Los Angeles Times Book Prize (Poetry category).

Phillips was a Chancellor of the Academy of American Poets from 2008 to 2012. and he was nominated for the 2014 Griffin Poetry Prize for Silverchest.

The Board of Trustees of The Kenyon Review honored Carl Phillips as the 2013 recipient of the Kenyon Review Award for Literary Achievement. Philips has also held fellowships from the Guggenheim Foundation, the Library of Congress, and the Academy of American Poets, for which he served as chancellor from 2006 to 2012.

Phillips was shortlisted for the 2024 T. S. Eliot Prize for Poetry, alongside Karen McCarthy Woolf, Raymond Antrobus, Gboyega Odubanjo, Rachel Mann and others.

== Selected bibliography ==
- In the Blood. UPNE, 1992; selected and introduced by Rachel Hadas. ISBN 9781555531355
- Cortège, Saint Paul, Minn.: Graywolf Press, 1995, ISBN 9781555972301
- From the Devotions, Saint Paul, Minn.: Graywolf Press, 1998, ISBN 9781555972639
- Pastoral, Saint Paul, Minn.: Graywolf Press, 2000, ISBN 9781555972981
- The Tether, New York: Farrar, Straus and Giroux, 2001, ISBN 9780374267933
- Rock Harbor, New York: Farrar, Straus and Giroux, 2002, ISBN 9780374528850
- The Rest of Love, New York: Farrar, Straus and Giroux, 2004, ISBN 9780374249533
- Coin of the Realm: Essays on the Art and Life of Poetry, Saint Paul, Minn.: Graywolf Press, 2004, ISBN 9781555974015
- Riding Westward: Poems. Farrar, Straus and Giroux. 2006. ISBN 978-0-374-53082-2.
- Quiver of Arrows: Selected Poems, 1986–2006. Farrar, Straus and Giroux. 2007. ISBN 978-0-374-53078-5.
- Speak Low, New York: Farrar, Straus and Giroux, 2009, ISBN 9780374267162
- Double Shadow, New York: Farrar, Straus and Giroux, 2011, ISBN 9780374141578
- Silverchest, New York: Farrar, Straus and Giroux, 2013, ISBN 9780374261214
- The Art of Daring: Risk, Restlessness, Imagination. Minneapolis: Graywolf Press, 2014, ISBN 978-1-55597-681-1 (print), ISBN 978-1-55597-093-2 (eBook)
- Reconnaissance: Poems, New York: Farrar, Straus and Giroux, 2015, ISBN 9780374248284
- Wild Is the Wind, New York: Farrar, Straus and Giroux, 2018, ISBN 9780374290269
- Star Map with Action Figures, Little Rock, Ark.: Sibling Rivalry Press, 2019, ISBN 9781943977659
- Pale Colors in a Tall Field, New York: Farrar, Straus and Giroux, 2020, ISBN 9780374229054

=== Critical studies, reviews and biography ===
- Chiasson, Dan (April 15, 2013). "End of the line : new poems from Carl Phillips". The Critics. Books. The New Yorker. Vol. 89, no. 9. pp. 78–79.
