= His Name Is George Floyd =

2022 biography of murder victim

His Name Is George Floyd: One Man's Life and the Struggle for Racial Justice
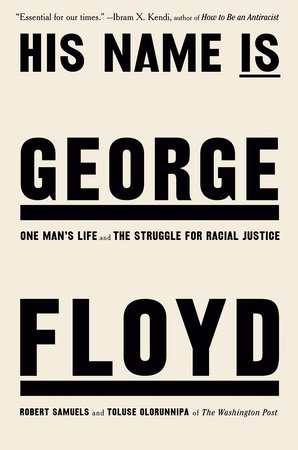
- Author: Robert Samuels; Toluse Olorunnipa
- Language: English
- Subject: George Floyd
- Published: 17 May 2022
- Publisher: Viking Press
- Pages: 432
- Awards: Pulitzer Prize for General Nonfiction
- ISBN: 978-0-593-49061-7

His Name Is George Floyd: One Man's Life and the Struggle for Racial Justice is a 2022 biography about murder victim George Floyd written by Washington Post journalists Robert Samuels and Toluse Olorunnipa.

== Synopsis ==
The book uses the life of George Floyd and his murder by Minneapolis police officer Derek Chauvin as a lens through which to examine racism in the United States. The book draws from interviews with many of Floyd's friends, family, and local community members. Floyd's ancestors are discussed—they worked as tenant farmers during the Reconstruction era. Aspects of Floyd's life, such as his parenting, drug addiction, and convictions, are covered. Race-related commentary about education housing segregation, incarceration, police brutality and terrorism in the United States is connected to the life of Floyd.

== Reception ==
His Name is George Floyd was awarded the 2023 Pulitzer Prize for General Nonfiction with the following citation: "An intimate, riveting portrait of an ordinary man whose fatal encounter with police officers in 2020 sparked an international movement for social change, but whose humanity and complicated personal story were unknown."

The book was also a finalist for the 2022 National Book Award for Nonfiction, J. Anthony Lukas Book Prize, and Los Angeles Times Book Prize for Biography. TIME included it in their list of "100 Must-Read Books of 2022", and Kirkus Reviews in their list of the "Best 2022 Books About Black Life in America".

Kehinde Andrews of The Guardian praised the book's coverage of Floyd, saying that it "does not paint him as a saint but explains his flaws in the context of his experiences". Andrews approved of the authors' "valiant effort to use Floyd's story to educate society about the ills of structural racism", but suggested that they could have focused on a subject such as Breonna Taylor to draw attention to the lesser covered oppression of Black women in the United States.

In The Atlantic, Imbolo Mbue similarly praised the authors "for presenting Floyd as the complex character that he was". Mbue recommended the book as "expertly researched" and "a necessary and enlightening read", highlighting in particular passages that celebrate African American culture and "depict how much Floyd was loved and how much he loved back". However, Mbue criticized that the book could have "more pointedly" highlighted the "hypocrisy of governments and corporations and all manners of institutions" that showed support for the Black Lives Matter movements out of ulterior motives.
