= Wan Runnan =

Chinese businessman and activist (1946–2025)

- 万润南
- Born: 29 October 1946; Yixing, Jiangsu, China
- Died: 13 October 2025 (aged 78); Créteil, France
- Occupation: Software engineer
- Known for: Pro-democracy activism

Wan Runnan (Chinese: 万润南; pinyin: Wàn Rùnnán; 29 October 1946 – 13 October 2025) was a Chinese software engineer, businessman, and human rights activist. Wan founded Stone Corporation, the first private computer company in China. He was known for his support for the 1989 Tiananmen Square protests, which he financed heavily.

== Life and career ==
Wan was born in Yixing, Jiangsu on 29 October 1946. He studied construction engineering at Tsinghua University in the 1960s. There, he married his classmate Liu Tao, daughter of President Liu Shaoqi. In 1970, Wan divorced Liu and was sent to work in the countryside amidst the Cultural Revolution. There, he worked on the railroads and taught middle school. He also met his second wife, Li Yu. Li was the daughter of Li Chang, who likely helped Wan get a job in the Computer Center of the Chinese Academy of Sciences in 1976.

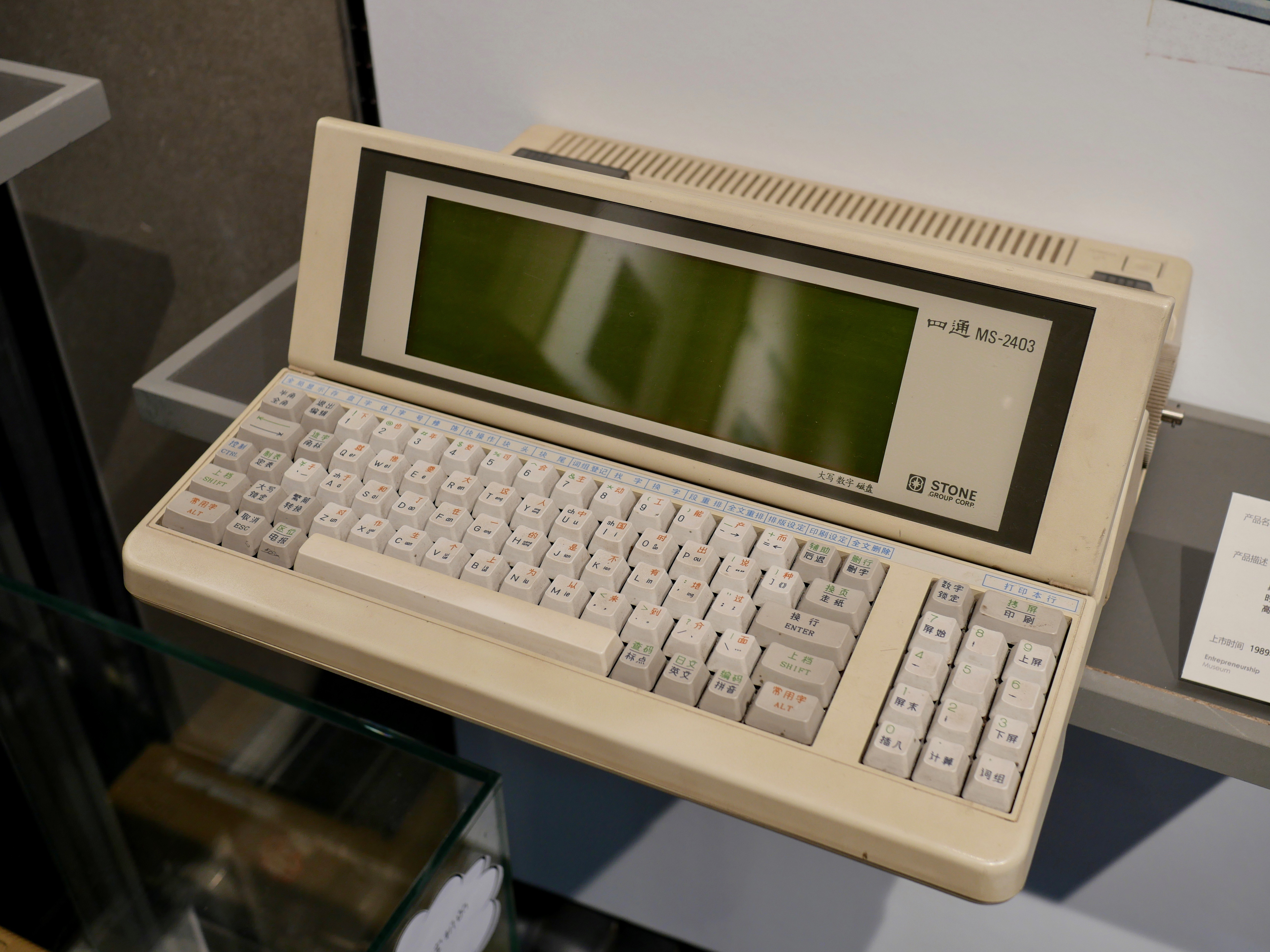
Stone MS-2403 typewriter

On 16 May 1984, Wan and his partners founded Stone Emerging Industries Company (四通新型产业公司; Sìtōng Xīnxíng Chǎnyè Gōngsī) in Haidian, Beijing. The company was legally registered as a collective, the only way for a private company to have more than seven employees before 1988. Wan would serve as president of the company until June 1989.

Stone's first project was a program allowing dot-matrix printers to print Chinese characters, which it sold to government ministries. Stone had completed the software in eight days; a state-run firm had failed to complete a similar project, despite beginning three months earlier, due to government bureaucracy. The printers were made by Brother and sold by Mitsui; Stone and Mitsui would later form a "long-term alliance".

In 1985, Stone moved from the office of an electronics parts factory, where it had been founded, to Zhongguancun, a research and technology hub in Haidian. An investigation into Stone was launched by the Central Commission for Discipline Inspection in an effort to shut it down, but the investigation ended in 1986 with no results.

From 1985, Stone moved from Chinese character printers to word processing and other office technology. It also formed several legally separate but related companies, but it was hindered by regulation preventing the separate companies from working together effectively. Changes in regulations allowed the formation of a holding company in May 1986, which united six Stone subsidiaries under a single management. Named "Beijing Haidian Stone Group Company" at first, by 1993 it was simply "Stone Group Company".

When the pro-democracy protests began in April 1989, Wan provided material support for the demonstrators in Tiananmen Square and helped organize negotiations between the students and government. When the situation deteriorated, Wan tried to convince the students to leave the square, but his warnings went unheeded. After the military crackdown on June 4, Wan was wanted by the Chinese authorities and fled to Paris.

A month after the massacre, Wan Runnan, along with prominent exiles such as Liu Binyan, Wuer Kaixi and Yan Jiaqi, met in Paris to call for the creation of the Federation for a Democratic China (FDC).

In 2014, Wan was interviewed by the Financial Times. The interview generated a response in the Chinese state-run Global Times, written by its editor Hu Xijin. The column was noted as a rare mention of the Tiananmen Square incident in a state-run newspaper.

Wan is one of three subjects in the feature documentary The Exiles (2022) which won the Grand Jury Prize for Best Documentary at the Sundance Film Festival.

Wan died from heart disease in Créteil, near Paris, on 13 October 2025, at the age of 78. Though he had wished to become a naturalized French citizen to "have the opportunity to vote for a leader once in his life", the process was not completed before his death.
