= Toluse Olorunnipa =

American journalist and political commentator

- Education: Stanford University (BA, MSc)
- Occupations: Journalist; political commentator
- Notable work: His Name Is George Floyd: One Man's Life and the Struggle for Racial Justice
- Website: toluse.com

Toluse "Tolu" Olorunnipa (Toe-Loo Oh-lo-roon-NEE-pa) is a Nigerian-American journalist and political commentator. He is the first reporter of native African and Nigerian descent to cover the White House. Of Yoruba heritage, Olorunnipa was named the White House Bureau Chief for The Washington Post in July 2022.

== Education ==
Olorunnipa earned a Bachelor of Arts in Sociology and MSc from Stanford University. In college, Olorunnipa wrote for The Stanford Daily.

== Career ==
Olorunnipa writes for The Washington Post and is an analyst for CNN. He previously worked for Bloomberg News and The Miami Herald. His columns have been featured in The Wall Street Journal, The Chicago Tribune, Bloomberg Businessweek, The Tampa Bay Times, The Seattle Times, The Nation, and others. He has been featured as a panelist on Washington Week and Face the Nation, and frequently appears on CNN, MSNBC, CBS News, and C-SPAN as a political analyst.

In 2022 he coauthored the biography about George Floyd His Name Is George Floyd: One Man's Life and the Struggle for Racial Justice with journalist Robert Samuels. The book was a finalist for the 2022 National Book Award for Nonfiction and the winner of the 2023 Pulitzer Prize for General Nonfiction.
