= Jing Tsu =

Taiwanese-American author and professor (born 1973)

- 石靜遠
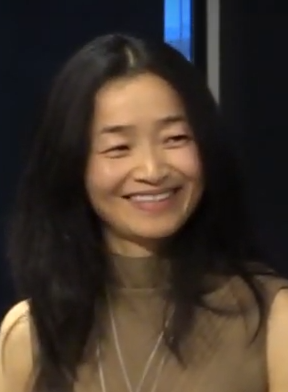
- Tsu in 2019
- Born: Tsu Jing-yuan; 1973 (age 52–53); Taiwan

Academic background
- Education: University of California, Berkeley (BA, MA); Harvard University (PhD)
- Thesis: Failure: Nation, race, and literature in China, 1895–1937 (2001)
- Doctoral advisor: Leo Ou-fan Lee

Academic work
- Discipline: East Asian studies; Comparative literature
- Institutions: Yale University

Jing Yuan Tsu (Chinese: 石靜遠; pinyin: Shí Jìngyuǎn; born 1973) is a Taiwanese-American author and professor of East Asian studies. Born in Taiwan, she immigrated to the United States at the age of nine. After receiving a PhD from Harvard University in East Asian languages and civilizations in 2001, she became a professor at Yale University.

At Yale, Tsu was named the chair of the Council on East Asian Studies at the MacMillan Center for International and Area Studies and Jonathan D. Spence Professor of Comparative Literature and East Asian Languages and Literatures in 2024. Tsu has published three books; her third, Kingdom of Characters, was a finalist for the 2023 Pulitzer Prize and a nominee for the Baillie Gifford Prize.

== Early life and education ==
Jing Tsu was born in Taiwan in 1973. In primary school, Tsu was a troublesome student; in a 2023 interview, she recalled her teachers referring to her as "female tiger" due to the lack of effect punishment had on her. At the age of nine, she moved with her mother Sue and her siblings to a small New Mexico town. Her father did not accompany them to the United States. Tsu's mother, who had previously been a teacher, taught her and her siblings Chinese calligraphy and writing, and drove them to Albuquerque for weekly piano lessons.

Tsu graduated from the University of California, Berkeley, with a bachelor's degree in comparative literature and a master's degree in rhetoric. In 2001, she earned her Ph.D. from Harvard University in Chinese studies.

== Career ==
=== Academia ===
Tsu was a junior fellow of the Harvard Society of Fellows from 2001 to 2004. She also held fellowships at Stanford University and Princeton University, and was later awarded a Guggenheim Fellowship in 2016. She became an assistant professor at Yale University in 2006, teaching post-20th century Chinese culture and literature. Tsu later became the chair of the Council on East Asian Studies at the MacMillan Center for International and Area Studies at Yale, and in 2019, she was named the John M. Schiff Professor of East Asian Languages and Literatures and of Comparative Literature. She was subsequently named the Jonathan D. Spence Professor of Comparative Literature and East Asian Languages and Literatures in 2024.

=== Authorship ===
Tsu published her first book, Failure, Nationalism, and Literature: The Making of Modern Chinese Identity, 1895–1937, in 2005. The book, published by Stanford University Press, received praise; in a 2008 review, James Leibold called it "innovative and provocative". She followed it with Sound and Script in Chinese Diaspora, released in 2010 by Harvard University Press, which was described as "groundbreaking" and "captivating".

In 2022, Tsu released her third book, Kingdom of Characters, with Penguin Press. The book begins focused upon the period of decline that China suffered at the beginning of the 20th century, and covers the subsequent innovations and developments of the Chinese language made in order to standardize and modernize it. It additionally follows the lives of the individuals who spearheaded said innovations. The book was very positively received; it was a finalist for the 2023 Pulitzer Prize and a nominee for the Baillie Gifford Prize for Non-Fiction. It was also named a New York Times Notable Book in 2022. In a review for The New York Times, Deirdre Mask praised Tsu's ability to weave linguistic and historical fact in a colorful manner. Tsu has also published articles in multiple newspapers, including The New York Times and the Financial Times. Her writings usually comprise discussions of modern Chinese geopolitics as well as book reviews.

== Bibliography ==
- Failure, Nationalism, and Literature: The Making of Modern Chinese Identity, 1895–1937 (2005)
- Sound and Script in Chinese Diaspora (2010)
- Kingdom of Characters: A Tale of Language, Obsession, and Genius in Modern China (2022)
