= Thomas S. Mullaney =

American sinologist (born 1978)

- Born: 1978 (age 47–48)
- Known for: The Chinese Computer (2024); How We Disappear (2026)

Academic background
- Education: Johns Hopkins University; Columbia University

Academic work
- Discipline: technology, race, and ethnicity in China
- Institutions: Director, SILICON, Stanford Presidential Initiative

Thomas Shawn Mullaney (simplified Chinese: 墨磊宁; traditional Chinese: 墨磊寧, born 1978) is an American sinologist. He is a Guggenheim fellow. He is professor of history at Stanford University, working on technology, race, and ethnicity in China.

Mullaney received his Ph.D. in history from Columbia University in 2006 after completing a doctoral dissertation under the supervision of Madeleine Zelin. His dissertation became the basis of his first book, Coming to Terms with the Nation: Ethnic Classification in Modern China, which received the 2011 American Historical Association Pacific Branch Award for “Best First Book on Any Historical Subject.” Benedict Anderson wrote a foreword for the book.

In 2006, Mullaney joined the faculty of Stanford as assistant professor. He was promoted to associate professor with tenure in 2012, and to full professor in 2019.

His 2017 book The Chinese Typewriter: A History won the John K. Fairbank Prize, the Lewis Mumford Award, and Honorable Mention by the Joseph Levenson Book Prize.

== Education ==
- PhD, Columbia University, 2006
- MA, The Johns Hopkins University, 2000
- BA, The Johns Hopkins University, 1999

== Selected publications and exhibitions ==
=== Monographs ===
- Coming to terms with the nation: ethnic classification in modern China, Berkeley: University of California Press, 2011, ISBN 978-0-520-26278-2
- The Chinese typewriter: a history, Cambridge, MA: MIT Press, 2017, ISBN 978-0-262-03636-8
- With Rea, Christopher G. (2022), Where research begins: choosing a research project that matters to you (and the world), University of Chicago Press, ISBN 978-0-226-81735-4
- The Chinese computer: a global history of the information age, Cambridge, MA: MIT Press, 2024, ISBN 978-0-262-04751-7

=== Museum exhibitions ===
- Radical Machines: Chinese in the Information Age (Museum of Chinese in America, San Diego Chinese Historical Museum)

=== Edited volumes and special issues ===
- With Leibold, James; Gros, Stéphane; Bussche, Eric Vanden, eds. (2012), Critical Han studies: the history, representation, and identity of China's majority, Berkeley: University of California Press, ISBN 978-0-984-59098-8
- The Chinese Deathscape: Grave Reform in Modern China. Stanford University Press, 2019.
- With Peters, Benjamin; Hicks, Mar; Philip, Kavita, eds. (2021), Your computer is on fire, Cambridge, MA: MIT Press, ISBN 978-0-262-53973-9

== Awards and honors ==
- 2021 Library of Congress John W. Kluge Center Chair in Technology & Society
- 2018 Guggenheim Fellowship
- 2018 John K. Fairbank Prize (for The Chinese Typewriter: A History)
- 2018 Andrew W. Mellon Foundation New Directions Fellowship
- 2018 The Lewis Mumford Award for Outstanding Scholarship in the Ecology of Technics (for The Chinese Typewriter: A History)
- 2016 Andrew W. Mellon Foundation Sawyer Seminar [Project: Digital Humanities Asia (DHAsia); Duration: 2016-2018]
- 2013 Abbot Payson Usher Prize [For “The Moveable Typewriter: How Chinese Typists Developed Predictive Text during the Height of Maoism.”]
- 2012-14 National Science Foundation 3-Year Grant (Science, Technology and Society Award)
- 2011 American Historical Association Pacific Branch Award for “Best First Book on Any Historical Subject”
- 2010-12 Annenberg Faculty Fellow
