= Robert Samuels (journalist) =

- Education: Northwestern University (BA)
- Occupation: Journalist
- Notable work: His Name Is George Floyd: One Man's Life and the Struggle for Racial Justice

Robert Samuels is an American journalist. He is a national enterprise reporter at The Washington Post.

== Career ==
Robert Samuels is a graduate of the Medill School of Journalism at Northwestern University. As an undergraduate, he was the editor of BlackBoard, the black student magazine, but left the job to become the editor-in-chief of The Daily Northwestern. After working at an internship at The Washington Post, he took a full-time job as a staff writer at The Miami Herald. In February 2011, he returned to the staff at The Post, where he developed a reputation for doing on-the-ground stories about race, politics and the changing American identity. His work garnered him many awards, including a finalist for the Livingston Award for Young Journalists and the Toner Prize for Excellence in Political Reporting. With a team of reporters, he won a George Polk Award and a Peabody Award. With Toluse Olorunnipa, he is the co-author of His Name Is George Floyd: One Man's Life and the Struggle for Racial Justice, a 2022 biography about George Floyd. The book was a finalist for the 2022 National Book Award for Nonfiction and the winner of the 2023 Pulitzer Prize for General Nonfiction.
