= Robert F. Kennedy Journalism Award =

American journalism award by the Robert F. Kennedy Center for Justice and Human Rights

The Robert F. Kennedy Awards for Excellence in Journalism is a journalism award named after Robert F. Kennedy and awarded by the Robert F. Kennedy Center for Justice and Human Rights. The annual awards are issued in several categories and were established in December 1968 by a group of reporters who covered Kennedy's campaigns. Winners are judged by more than 50 journalists each year, led by a committee of six independent journalists. The awards honor reporting "on issues that reflect Robert F. Kennedy's concerns, including human rights, social justice and the power of individual action in the United States and around the world. Entries include insights into the causes, conditions and remedies of injustice and critical analysis of relevant public policies, programs, attitudes and private endeavors." The awards are known as the "poor people's Pulitzers" in media circles.

== Recipients ==
Note: This list of winners is incomplete.

=== 1969–1979 ===
1969

The first awards were presented by Kennedy's widow, Ethel Kennedy.

- Network TV: CBS for "Black History: Lost, Stolen or Strayed", written by Perry Wolf and narrated by Bill Cosby.
- Magazine: David Nevin, Life magazine for "These Murdered Old Old Mountains."
- Newspaper: Nick Kotz of The Des Moines Register and Tribune for coverage of rural poverty and hunger.

1970

The second annual awards were presented at the Federal City Club in Washington, D.C., with multiple awardees in each category.

- National TV:
  - ABC News for "Black Fiddler: Prejudice and the Negro," produced by Stephen Fleischman.
  - NBC News for "Between Two Rivers," narrated by Tom Pettit, from the First Tuesday series.
  - Honorable Mention: Group W for "The shame of Welfare," produced by Dick Hubert.
- Local TV:
  - WRC-TV for "Perspective: New Set of Eyes," produced by Bill Leonard.
  - KNXT-TV for "The Siesta is Over (Revisited)," produced by Ken Rosen.
  - Honorable Mention: WCKT-TV for "Migrant Workers," news director Gene Strul.
- Radio:
  - WJR for "I Am Not Alone," reported by Phil Jones.
  - Honorable Mention: WAKY for "Soul Searching," produced by Bob Watson.
- Newspaper:
  - Linda Rockey for a series on the problems of hunger in the Chicago Sun Times.
  - Dallas Kinney and Kent Pollock of the Palm Beach Post-Times for "Migration to Misery," an eight-part series on the life and dreams of migrant farm workers.

Articles in Series:
1. "They Live Unwanted, in the Shadows of Society", October 5, 1969
2. "A Perpetual Cycle Traps the Migrant", October 6, 1969
3. "Squeezing Out a Living", October 7, 1969
4. "For $50 a Month: A One-Room Shed, No Toilets", October 8, 1969
5. "Migrant Gets What's Left", October 9, 1969
6. "An Elderly Migrant Who Waits to Die", October 10, 1969
7. "Bubba Boone: A Migrant Out of the Stream", October 11, 1969
8. "The County's Effort Expansive But Not Enough", October 12, 1969

- Magazines:
  - Fred C. Shapiro for "The Whitmore Confessions" in The New Yorker, about the case of George Whitmore Jr..
  - Honorable Mention: Dr. Robert Coles and Harry Huge for a series of reports in The New Republic on the problems of the disadvantaged.

1971

The third annual awards were presented by Ethel Kennedy during a luncheon ceremony held at the John F. Kennedy Center for the Performing Arts in Washington, D.C., which was still under construction. Entertainer Bill Cosby was the master of ceremonies, and Tim Wickers of The New York Times gave the keynote speech. The winners were selected from over 275 entries. No awards were given in the Radio and Magazines categories.

- TV:
  - NBC News for "Migrant: An NBC White Paper" with correspondent Chet Huntley, produced by Martin Carr.
  - Richard Hubert, Paul Galan, Rod MacLeish, Westinghouse Broadcasting Company for "When You Reach December."
- Newspapers:
  - Ralph Looney of the Albuquerque Tribune for the nine-part series "The Plight of the Navajo."
  - Sam Washington and Jerome Watson of the Chicago Sun-Times for a series on schools for the intellectually disabled.
- Special awards:
  - Ruben Salazar of the Los Angeles Times for a collection of 17 columns that "communicated effectively and compassionately the culture and alienation of Chicanos." The award was accepted by Salazar's widow, Sally.
  - The New Thing, an arts and architecture workshop in Washington, D.C., for the film "This Is the Home of Mrs. Levant Graham, the New Thing."

1972

The fourth annual awards were presented by Rose Kennedy during a luncheon ceremony at the John F. Kennedy Center for the Performing Arts. Ralph Nader gave the keynote speech. Eligibility was expanded to include high school entries.

- TV:
  - Paul Altmeyer and the Urban America Unit of Group W for "The Suburban Wall," a documentary on discrimination in suburban housing narrated by Rod MacLeish.
- Radio:
  - Doug Fox of KTOK for "The Business of Being Black," a five-part series on the economic problems of African Americans in Oklahoma City.
- Newspapers:
  - Patrick Zier and Joanna Wragg of The Ledger for the four-part series "Crisis in Public Housing" about public housing issues in Lakeland, Florida.
  - John Nordenheimer of The New York Times for a story about an African American Medal of Honor recipient who was killed during a holdup at a grocery store in Detroit, Michigan.

Article:
- "From Dakto to Detroit: Death of a Troubled Hero", May 26, 1971

- Magazines:
  - Edward Kosner, Peter Goldman, and Don Holt of Newsweek for "Justice on Trial," a series on the criminal justice system.
  - Beekman Winthrop for a story on intestinal parasites in children that was published in New South.
- Honorable mention print:
  - Robert Raisch and Neil Scott of United World Press Cooperative for the entire October 21, 1971, issue of Rama Pipien: A People's Media, Ingest Digest.
- Honorable mention college:
  - Al Benson of The Spectrum (State University of New York at Buffalo) for "Health Care Crisis".

1973

The fifth annual awards were presented by Ethel Kennedy with the assistance of her brother-in-law, Senator Edward Kennedy. Harvard psychiatrist Robert Coles gave the keynote address. The awardees were chosen from 418 entries, including 61 high school and 37 college entries.

- Newspapers:
  - Jean Heller of the Associated Press for a series entitled "The Tuskegee Syphilis Study" exposing a federal experiment that left a number of infected African American men untreated.
  - Citation: Agustin Gurza, editor of LaVoz del Pueblo in Hayward, California.
  - Citation: Mike Masterson, editor of the Newport Daily Independent in Newport, Arkansas.
  - Citation: Jack Brimeyer, Max Winter, Telegraph-Herald, Dubuque, Iowa, "The Rosebud Reservation".
- Radio:
  - Citation: Producer Mucio Carlon and the University of Arizona's public radio station KUAT for "What it's Like," a weekly program for ethnic minorities.
- TV:
  - Geraldo Rivera of WABC-TV for "Willowbrook: The Last Disgrace," a documentary about the effects of budget cuts on Willowbrook State School for intellectually disabled children in New York City. The documentary led Governor Nelson Rockefeller to restore funding to the school.
  - Citation: Thomas Norton for "Migrants of Central Illinois," an episode of the CIA Reports documentary series produced by WCIA. The documentary focuses on migrant workers in the Hoopeston, Illinois, area.

1974

The sixth annual awards were presented by Ethel Kennedy. Frances Farenthold gave the keynote speech. The awardees were selected from 432 entries.

- Citation – High School:
  - Tarl Oliason, co-editor of The Chieftain, the newspaper of Pocatello High School in Pocatello, Idaho, for stories on racial equality and confrontation between black and white students at the school.
  - Joseph Hearst III, co-editor of The Chieftain, for stories and editorials on a conflict between Idaho State University's Native American Student Association and Pocatello High School over a Native American symbol at the high school.
- Magazine:
  - John Guinther of Philadelphia Magazine for "The Only Good Indian."
- Newspaper:
  - Dolores Katz and Jo Thomas of the Detroit Free Press for an 18-part series, "Psychosurgery on Trial".
  - Citation: Gloria Delgado of the Express and News for coverage of the Liza Guerra kidnapping.
  - Honorable mention: Mike Royko, Chicago Daily News, "Faceless Veteran".
  - Honorable mention: Hope Spencer, Newsday, "The Victims".
- Radio:
  - Honorable Mention: WCAU Radio for "Abortion: An Investigative Report."
  - Honorable Mention: WJR for "Manhunt Scars Community."
  - Citation: Rudolph Brewington of WWDC for "Diagnosis: Desperate - A report on Health Care for Minority Americans"
  - Citation: William Diehl of ABC Radio for "Why Did Patti Have To Die?"
- Citation, print:
  - Jane Daugherty of the St. Petersburg Times for a 15-part series on Pinellas County, Florida, nursing homes.
- TV:
  - Robert C. Dotson of WKY-TV for "Through the Looking Glass Darkly," a documentary about the history of African-American civil rights in Oklahoma from before statehood to 1973.
  - Honorable Mention: McGraw-Hill Broadcasting Company and KGTV-10 for "La Raza – The People."
  - Citation: Carlos Aguilar of WOAI-TV for "Fiesta Patrias".

1975

The seventh annual awards were presented by Ethel Kennedy and Haynes Johnson. Harry Golden gave the keynote address. The awardees were selected from approximately 300 entries.

- Magazine:
  - Loretta Schwartz of Philadelphia Magazine for "Nothing to Eat".
- Newspaper:
  - Executive editor Mike Masterson of the Hot Springs Sentinel-Record for continuing coverage of the problems of the disadvantaged.
- Print – Honorable Mention:
  - Francie Barnard of the Fort Worth Star-Telegram for "Congressional Discrimination," a series exposing discrimination in congressional hiring.

Articles in Series:
1. "Discrimination Found In Congressional Jobs Orders", August 18, 1974
2. "Justice Department Will Not Investigate Hiring", August 19, 1974
3. "Job-Order Forms Termed Authentic", August 20, 1974

- Print – Citation:
  - Nancy Greenberg of the Philadelphia Evening and Sunday Bulletin for "The Indomitable Sondra Diamond."

- Melinda Foote of The Palm Beach Post for "The Bittersweet Harvest," a series about the problems of Jamaican laborers brought each year to Palm Beach County, Florida, to cut sugar cane in the Everglades.

Articles in Series:
1. "The Bittersweet Harvest", November 24, 1974
2. "Selecting the Cane Cutters", November 25, 1974
3. "It's Filthy, Back-Breaking Work", November 26, 1974
4. "Time Off", November 27, 1974
5. "The Economics of a Bittersweet Harvest", November 28, 1974

- Radio:
  - Terence Gurley of WWVA Radio in Wheeling, West Virginia, for "Back to Bloody Harlan."
- Television:
  - Martin Berman, Peter Lance, and Geraldo Rivera of WABC-TV for "The Willowbrook Case: The People vs. The State of New York."
- Television – Citation:
  - Hill Mermont of WGTV in Athens, Georgia, for "The Bikinians."
  - Luis R. Cano, Philip Cano, Roberto Gutierez, and Willie Navarro of the Association for the Advancement of Mexican Americans and KTRK-TV for "The Aztecas and Their Medicine: A Chicano Legacy."

1976

- Radio: Bob Cain, Cathleen Gurley, WWVA Radio, Wheeling, West Virginia, "Care and Feeding of America".
- TV: Tom Pettit, NBC News, "Feeding the Poor".
- TV honorable mention: Dan Rather, John Sharnik, Peter Poor, CBS News, "CBS Reports: The I.Q. Myth".
- Print honorable mention: William Heffernan, Stewart Ain, New York Daily News, series on child care.

1977

- Grand prize and print: Acel Moore and Wendell Rawls, Jr., Grand Prize, for their coverage of the Fairview (PA) Hospital for the Criminally Insane in The Philadelphia Inquirer
- TV citation: Thom Dickerson, Lee Meredith, KTRK, Houston, Texas, "Requiem for a Dying Neighborhood", a documentary which described the decay in an area located in downtown Houston.
- TV citation: Ed Fillmer, KYTV, Springfield, Missouri, "The Retirement Trap".
- Print citation: Editorial staff, The Lake Placid News, New York, "Rebirth of Mohawk Nation or Illegal Land Grab".
- Honorable mention, college student: Christopher DeSalvo, Southern Illinois University, series on Laotian refugees.
- Honorable mention, college student: Bob Minnocci, West Virginia University, series on mental health.
- Honorable mention, print: Loretta Schwartz, Boston Magazine, Chicago Magazine, Philadelphia Magazine, various articles.
- Honorable mention, print: Edward T. Pound, Pam Zekman, Chicago Sun-Times, "Chicago's Money Merchants".
- Honorable mention, TV: William H. Willson, KCET, Los Angeles, "Handle with Care and Dignity".
- Honorable mention, TV: Bob Dotson, WKYC-TV, Cleveland, "The Urban Reservation".
- Honorable mention, TV: Sy Perlman, NBC, "Weekend" series on Sawyer Brothers.

1978

- Grand prize and TV: Bill Moyers, Tom Spain, Howard Stringer, Dan Lerner, CBS, "CBS Reports: The Fire Next Door".
- Print: Jonathan Neumann, William K. Marimow, The Philadelphia Inquirer, "Police Violence".
- TV citation: Jack Hill, KAIT-TV, Jonesboro, Arkansas, "Is There Any Hope for Hope Street".
- Print citation: Staff, Shreveport Journal, "Piney Woods Poverty".
- College student citation: New Expression newspaper, Youth Communication, Chicago.
- Honorable mention, print: Louie Gonzalez, Oakland Tribune, "I Was an Illegal".
- Honorable mention, print: Huge Aynesworth, John Bloom, Robert Montemayor, Howard Swindle, Paul West, Bryan Woolley, Dallas Times Herald, series on Castroville.
- Honorable mention, high school student: Jane Lincoln, Urban Journalism Workshop, 1310 Magazine, "A Walk Through Mt. Pleasant".
- Honorable mention, TV: Nancy Thurber, Robert Thurber, WPBT-TV, Miami, "God Gives You Years".

1979

- Grand prize and print prize: Fredric N. Tulsky, Nancy Weaver, Don Hoffman, The Clarion-Ledger, Jackson, Mississippi, "North Mississippi Justice".
- Radio: Steven L. McVicker, Jeanne Jones Riedmueller, KPFT, Houston, "The Question of Accountability: A Look at the Houston Police Department".
- Honorable mention, TV: Brian Ross, Janet Pearce, Joseph Angotti, NBC Nightly News, segment on migrant farm workers.
- Print citation: Mary Blakinger, Bucks County Courier Times, "Forced In, and Now Forced Out."

=== 1980–1989 ===
1980

- Grand prize and print: Chester Goolrick, Paul Lieberman, Lee May, Charlene P. Smith-Williams, Steve Johnson, The Atlanta Constitution, "The Underpaid and the Underprotected".
- Radio: Greg Barron, David Carlton Felland, KSJN, Minnesota Public Radio, "The Way to 8-A".
- TV: Howard Husock, Robert Ferrante, WGBH, "Community Disorder: Racial Violence in Boston".
- Citation, college student: Ron Hall, Pepperdine University, "A World of His Own".
- Citation, college student: Annals Kraft, Northern Virginia Community College, "Granny Hickory Stick".
- Honorable mention, photojournalism: Andrea Brunais, The Tampa Times, Florida, "Racism in Hillsborough County Schools".
- Honorable mention, photojournalism: David Olinger, Concord Monitor, New Hampshire, "Adrift".
- Honorable mention, print: Polly Ross Hughes, "D" magazine, Dallas, Texas, "Poor Man's Justice".
- Honorable mention, radio: Mark Poindexter, KCUR-FM, Kansas City, Missouri, "Missouri's Migrants".
- Honorable mention, TV: Dan Rather, Leslie Edwards, Don Hewitt, CBS News "60 Minutes", "Equal Justice".
- Honorable mention, TV: Philip Scheffler, CBS News "60 Minutes", "In the Mainstream".
- Honorable mention, TV: Stephen Fleischman, Richard Richter, Pamela Hill, ABC News "Close Up", "Nobody's Children".

1981

- Radio: Martin Teichner, Peter Wells, Clarence Fanto, CBS Radio Network (Newsmark), "Exodus: The Freedom Flotilla".
- TV: Joe Bergantino, Clarence Jones, Melissa Malkovitch, Lance Heflin, WPLG-TV, Miami, "The Billion Dollar Ghetto".
- Photojournalism: Len Lahman, Sharon Myers, Times-Advocate, Escondido, California, "Faces Beyond the Fence".
- Honorable mention, radio: John Merrow, Barbara Reinhardt, National Public Radio (Options in Education), "Race Against Time: School Desegregation".
- Honorable mention, TV: Susan Kinney, Bill Ruth, KRMA-TV, Denver, "Haunted House".
- Honorable mention, TV: Ken Swartz, WHAS-TV, Louisville, Kentucky, "When Can We Come Home".
- Citation, radio: Al Allen, WJLB-FM, Detroit, "Crime by Color: Black on Black".
- Citation, TVAlvin H. Perlmutter, Imre Horvath, Marc Brugnoni, Patrick Fahey, Martin Smith, Kalima Soham, WQED, Pittsburgh PBS, "Adoption in America".

1982

- Photojournalism: Jerry Lower, Southern Illinoisan, Carbondale, "A Touch of Nature".
- Photojournalism: Jay B. Mather, Louisville Courier-Journal, "She Ain't Stopping Now".
- College student: Jill Schoenstein, The Daily Pennsylvanian, University of Pennsylvania, "A Rough Education".
- Radio: Bill Buzenberg, National Public Radio, "All Things Considered", "Immigration and Refugees".
- TV: Mark Potter, Lance Heflin, WPLG-TV, Miami, "Human Cargo".
- Honorable mention, high school student: Leah Bryant, Sally Harris, West High School, Bakersfield, California, "Do You Know Where Your Grandparents Are?"
- Honorable mention, TV: Gil Noble, Susan Robeson, Doug Har, WABC-TV, New York, "Essay on Drugs".
- Honorable mention, photojournalism: Patt Blue, Life magazine, "Multiple Sclerosis: A Lingering Nightmare".

1983

- Radio: Bill Leslie, Mike Edwards, Donna Jones, Pamela Hart, Nancy Lyons, Steve Shumake, WRAL, Raleigh, North Carolina, "Five Faces of Poverty".
- TV: Jonathon Dann, Greg Lyon, Ken Swartz, KRON-TV, San Francisco, "The War Within".
- Cartoons: Don Wright, Miami News.
- College student: Renee Jacobs, Pennsylvania State University, "Cynthia's Case".
- Citation, cartoon: Sam C. Rawls, The Atlanta Constitution
- Citation, TV: Susan Lavery, Bill Lord, KTUV, Salt Lake City, Utah, "Criminal Illness".
- Citation, photojournalism: Karen Kasmauski, Virginian-Pilot/Ledger-Star, Virginia, "Lanette: A World of Her Own".
- Citation, photojournalism: Patt Blue, Life magazine, "Getting off Welfare."
- Honorable mention, print: John Hanchette, Carlton Sherwood, Brian Gallagher, Gannett News Service, "Oklahoma Shame".
- Honorable mention, TV: Martin Freeth, Dick Boydell, Sheila Hayman, WGBH, Boston, "Finding a Voice".
- Honorable mention, TV: Diane Baker, Rick Ridgeway, Home Box Office, "To Climb a Mountain".

1984

- Grand prize and TV: Peter Karl, Doug Longhini, Joe Paszcky, Bonnie van Gilder, WMAQ, Chicago, "Beating Justice: A Special Report".
- Photojournalism: April Saul, The Philadelphia Inquirer, "The Gift of Family".
- Print: George Getschow, The Wall Street Journal, "Dirty Work".
- Radio: Patrick Cassidy, WMAQ Radio, Chicago, "School Says You're Retarded".
- Citation, print: Rob Wilkins, Sandusky Register, Ohio, "Hunger and Hope".
- Citation, print: Steve Konicki, Luisa Yanez, The Miami News, "The Cuban Quintas".
- Citation, photojournalism: Bruce Chambers, Glenn S. Capers, Mari Shaefer, P.K. Weis, Tucson Citizen, "Land in Torment".
- Citation, photojournalism: Carol Guzy, The Miami Herald, "Little Haiti".
- Citation, TV: Carol M. Rosenbaum, Virgilio Argimedes, Miriam Thomas, WTVD-TV, Durham, North Carolina, "Poverty Has a Woman's Face".
- Citation, TV: Lee Luse, KCTA-TV, St. Paul, Minnesota, "The Legacy of Baby Doe".
- Honorable mention, cartoon: Bill Day, The Commercial Appeal, Memphis, "Government Assistance".
- Honorable mention, radio: Art Silverman, Verta Mae Grosvernor, National Public Radio, "Daufuskie".
- Honorable mention, TV: Don Hewitt, Suzanne St. Pierre, Morley Safer, CBS News "60 Minutes", "Lenell Geter's In Jail".
- Honorable mention, photojournalism: Carol Guzy, Miami Herald, "Wishbook".
- Honorable mention, photojournalism: Mary Ellen Mark, Life magazine, "Streets of the Lost: Runaway Kids".
- Honorable mention, print: Neil Henry, The Washington Post, "The Black Dispatch."
- Honorable mention, college student: Hal Wells, Columbia Missourian, University of Missouri, "Leading an Active LIFE".
- Honorable mention, college student: Phil Kuntzy, University of Florida, "The Discriminating Paddle".
- Honorable mention, high school student: Monique Craig, Interhigh Connection, Washington, D.C., "Washington's Hungry: A Capital Disgrace".

1985

- Grand prize and TV: David Fanning, Mark Obenhaus, PBS "Frontline", "Living Below the Line".
- Print: Staff of The Charlotte Observer, series on North Carolina's mental health system.
- College student: Kevin Davis, The Daily Illini, University of Illinois, "Prison Aftermath".
- Photojournalism: Cheryl McCall, Mary Ellen Mark, Life magazine, "Camp Good Times".
- Photojournalism: Lynn Johnson, Life magazine, "Kenny's World".
- TV: Christopher Jeans, David Fanning, Charlie Cobb, PBS "Frontline", "Bread, Butter and Politics".
- Citation, print: Jim Auchmutey, Mike Christiensen, The Atlanta Journal-Constitution, "Poverty 1984".
- Citation, print: Melvin Claxton, The Virgin Islands Daily News, "Public Housing / Public Shame".
- Citation, college student: Georgea Kovanis, University of Michigan, "Overcoming Barriers at the U".
- Citation, high school student: Alexei A. Waters, Leavenworth Senior High School, "Tony Roe Overcomes Blindness".
- Citation, high school student: A. Claire Palvagasi, Lakewood High School, "Trying to Share America's Wealth".
- Citation, radio: Diana Quinn, David Rush, Velma Cato, NBC Radio Network "The Source", Home Sweet Homeless / The Invisible People".
- Honorable mention, print: Marc Kaufman, The Philadelphia Inquirer, "The Hmong: At the Mercy of America".
- Honorable mention, college student: Janet Rae, Michigan Daily Weekend, University of Michigan, "Vagrants or Victims".
- Honorable mention, photojournalism: Mary Ellen Mark, Life magazine, "The Cruelest Crime".
- Honorable mention, radio: Anne Marshall, Mike Edgerly, WHAS Radio, Louisville, Kentucky, "Go Tell Sargent Shriver: The Life and Death of the War on Poverty in Eastern Kentucky".
- Honorable mention, TV: Malcolm Clarke, Japhet Asher, HBO, "Soldiers in Hiding".

1986

- Grand prize and print: Staff of The Chicago Tribune, "The American Millstone".
- Photojournalism: Tom Gralish, The Philadelphia Inquirer, "How They Survive".
- Radio: Scott Simon, Neva Grant, Ina Jaffe, National Public Radio, "A State of Emergency".
- TV: Special projects staff, WSMV-TV, Nashville, "Reflections in Black and White".
- Citation, cartoon: Mike Peters, Dayton Daily News
- Citation, print: Douglas Pardue, Roanoke Times and World News, "Forgotten Houses, Forgotten People".
- Citation, TV: Dan Medina, KHJ-TV, Los Angeles, "Our Children: The Next Generation".
- Citation, photojournalism: John Keating, Dallas Times Herald, "Thalidomide Victim".
- Honorable mention, cartoon: H. Clay Bennett, St. Petersburg Times.
- Honorable mention, photojournalism: Stephen Shames, APF Reporter / The Philadelphia Inquirer, "Child Poverty in America".
- Honorable mention, photojournalism: Sarah Leen, The Philadelphia Inquirer, "Losing Max: Living With Alzheimer's".
- Honorable mention, radio: Frank Raphael, Peter Laufer, Lynn Peterson, Rusty Lutz, NBC Radio Network, "A Loss for Words".
- Honorable mention, TV: Jeanne Bowers, Bruce Johnson, Sandra Butler, Tim DeLuca, LaGeris Bell, Mike Trammell, WDVM-TV, Washington, "Out of Sight, Out of Mind".
- Honorable mention, print: Nina Bernstein, The Milwaukee Journal, "Justice Denied".

1987

- Grand prize and print: Steve McGonigle, Ed Timms, The Dallas Morning News, "Discrimination in Juries".
- Photojournalism: David Leeson, Dallas Morning News, "Hungry and Homeless".
- College student: Joyce Mendel, University of New Mexico, "The Land Is So Sacred to Us".
- High school student: Salome Junco, Seward Park High School, New York, "Illegal Aliens: I Am Very Frightened Every Day".
- Radio: Craig Cheathem, WLAP-AM, Lexington, Kentucky, "Passing on the Secret of Sexual Abuse".
- TV: David Fanning, Mark Obenhaus, Edward Gray, WGBH-TV, Boston, "Growing Up Poor".
- Citation, photojournalism, April Saul, The Philadelphia Inquirer, "Survived by a Daughter".
- Citation, TV: Marilyn Deutsch, Gary Schiedel, KOAP-TV, Portland, Oregon, "The Tiniest Junkies".
- Honorable mention, college, Rick Wartzman, Northwestern University / The Boston Globe, "When Mentally Ill Become Violent, Few Have Easy Solutions".
- Honorable mention, high school, Nellie Park, Truman High School, Independence, Missouri, "Drumm Farm Gives a Second Chance".
- Honorable mention, print: Jenni Bergal, Kiki Bochi, Fred Schulte, News/Sun-Sentinel, Fort Lauderdale, Florida, "Suffer the Children".
- Honorable mention, cartoon: Bill Day, Detroit Free Press, "The Color Black 'n' Blue".
- Honorable mention, radio: Steve Shomaker, KMOX Radio, St. Louis, Missouri, "A Bankrupt Heritage".
- Honorable mention, TV: Lori VanKirk, Brenda Buratti, Boyd Levet, KGW-TV, Portland, Oregon, "In Search of Home".

1988

- Grand prize and print: Alex Kotlowitz, The Wall Street Journal, "Urban Trauma".
- Photojournalism: Donna Ferrato, Dick Polman, Philadelphia Inquirer, "Domestic Violence Part I".
- College student: Larry Lee, Columbia Missourian, University of Missouri, "Rich Land, Poor People".
- Citation, TV: Barry Ahrendt, Jeanne Blake, Jimmy Frances, WBZ-TV, Boston, "AIDS: The Paul Cronan Story".
- Citation, print: Staff writer, The Sacramento Bee, "Hunger in California".
- Honorable mention, print: Tracy Thompson, Larry Copeland, The Atlanta Journal-Constitution, "Rural Justice".

1989

- Grand prize and print: Bill Dedman, The Atlanta Journal-Constitution, "The Color of Money".
- International: Colin Campbell, Deborah Scroggins, The Atlanta Journal-Constitution, "The Weapon of Famine".
- College student: Staff, Golden Gater, San Francisco State University, "Helpers in the War on AIDS".
- Radio: Dan Morris, Lynn Neary, National Public Radio, "625 K Street".
- TV: Bill Moyers, Elena Mannes, Public Affairs Television, "Promises! Promises!".
- Citation, photojournalism: Jon Kral, The Miami Herald, "Gangs".
- Citation, TV: Molly Bedell, Bill Kurtis, WBBM, Chicago, "Getting Out, Staying Out".
- Citation, print: Susan Faludi, The San Jose Mercury News, "The Preemie at 6."
- Honorable mention, photojournalism: Eugene Richards, Life magazine, "Crack: The Downfall of a Neighborhood".
- Honorable mention, print: Staff, The Chicago Tribune, "Chicago Schools: Worst in America".
- Honorable mention, radio: Tatiana Schreiber, Calley Crosley, Eileen Bolinsky, "Places Like This: Women In Prison".
- Honorable mention, TV: David Davis, Christine LaBeau, KCTS, Seattle, "Skid Road".

=== 1990–1999 ===
1990

- Grand Prize: The Fort Myers News-Press for "Far From the Dream"
- Print Prize: Charles Flowers and Pete Gallagher, The Seminole Tribune for coverage of the wrongful conviction of James Joseph Richardson
- Citation, TV: Al Briganti, Andrew Heyward, staff, CBS "48 Hours", "No Place Like Home".
- Honorable mention, cartoon: Mike Peters, The Dayton Daily News.

1991

- Grand prize and print: Jane Daugherty, Jeanne May, Bernie Shellum, The Detroit Free Press, "Workers and Risk".
- International: Peter Jennings, Leslie Cockburn, ABC News, "Peter Jennings Reports from the Killing Fields".
- Citation, international: Janice Tomlin, Tom Jarriel, Victor Neufeld, ABC News "20/20", "Nobody's Children: The Shame of a Nation".
- Citation, print: Lori Hall, Diane Conners, Bill Echlin, Anne Gertiser Stanton, Tom Care, Will Scott, Michelle Worobec, The Traverse City Record-Eagle, Michigan, "Faces of Poverty".
- Honorable mention, print: Eileen McNamara, Dolores King, Michale McDonald, The Boston Globe, "Birth in the Death Zones".
- TV Journalism: Jean Walkinshaw, "Children of the Homeless," 1991-04-30, SCCtv, American Archive of Public Broadcasting

1992

1993

- Grand prize and print: Paul McEnroe, Allen Short, The Minneapolis Star Tribune, "Licensed to Abuse".
- International photojournalism: Howard Castleberry, Houston Chronicle, "Somalia: A Nation at the Abyss".
- International print: Dudley Althaus, Houston Chronicle, "The New Awakening".
- TV: David Fanning, June Cross, WBGH "Frontline", Boston, "A Kid Kills".
- First Prize International Radio: Amy Goodman & Allan Nairn, "Massacre: The Story of East Timor"
- Honorable mention, print: Edward Pratt, The Advocate, Baton Rouge, Louisiana, "Can We Save Our Black Children".
- Honorable mention, photojournalism: Jon Marc Taylor, The Prison Mirror, "Pell Grants for Prisoners".
- Honorable mention, photojournalism: Al Diaz and Carl Juste, The Miami Herald for "Wish Book",
- Honorable mention, cartoon: Don Wright, The Palm Beach Post, "Perot for President".
- Honorable mention, college student: Laura Paynter, Rome News-Tribune, Georgia, "Welfare Is My Mama".

1994

- Grand prize and print: Staff, The Chicago Tribune, "Killing Our Children".
- TV: Alan Raymond, Susan Raymond, Home Box Office, "I Am a Promise".
- International print: Molly Moore, John Anderson, Julia Preston, Lena Sun, Caryle Murphy, The Washington Post, "Third World, Second Class".
- International radio: Michael Skoler, National Public Radio, "A Prayer for Burundi".
- International TV: Ron Allen, Diego Grinaldi, Jane Hartney, Steve Schnee, ABC News, "World News Tonight: Sudan Famine".
- Radio: Alyne Ellis, Donna Limerick, Johanna Cooper, National Public Radio "Horizons", "Taking Care of Undocumented Kids".
- International photojournalism: Honorable Mention, The Miami Herald for "Immigration Hope and Despair"
- Student: Nils Rosdahl, Christine Labang, Kathy Hostetter, Lori Vivian, Justin Smith, Ryan Bronson, Patricia Snyder, The Sentinel, North Idaho College, "Learning Challenges".
- Honorable mention, international print: M.C. Burns, Herald-Journal, Syracuse, New York, "Somalia's Sorrow".
- Honorable mention, international radio: Daniel Zwerdling, National Public Radio, "AIDS in Zambia".
- Honorable mention, photojournalism: Robin Donina, St. Petersburg Times, "Portraits of a Plague".

1995

- Print: Leon Dash, The Washington Post, "Rosa Lee's Story".
- Photography: Brian Peterson, Star Tribune, "Testing the Human Spirit".
- International print: Barbara Demick, The Philadelphia Inquirer, "Logavina Street".
- International radio: Tom Gjelten, Michael Sullivan, National Public Radio, "Sarajevo: Another Winter of War".
- International TV: Jim Wooten, ABC News, "Jim Wooten Report from Rwanda".
- International: David Leeson, The Dallas Morning News, "Angola".
- Radio: Maria Hinojosa, National Public Radio, "Jail Seen as a Rite of Passage".
- Student: Kevin Shockley, Kenneth Eich, KBIA-FM, University of Missouri-Columbia, "Helping Hands".
- TV: Meredith Viera, Michele Riorden-Read, ABC News "Turning Point", "Sean's Story: A Lesson in Life".
- Special recognition, TV: "Hoop Dreams: The Documentary".
- Honorable mention, cartoon: Mike Luckovich, The Atlanta Constitution.
- Honorable mention, international radio, Betty Rogers, Alyne Ellis, Donna Limerick, National Public Radio, "Horizons: Behind the Smile, Child Prostitution in Thailand".
- Honorable mention, international television: Demetria Kalodimos, Pat Slattery, WSMV-TV, Nashville, "Hope for 100,000".
- Honorable mention, photography: Carol Guzy, The Washington Post, "Haiti: Out of the Darkness, a Whisper of Hope".
- Honorable mention, print: Deborah Yetter, Courier Journal, Louisville, Kentucky, "Juvenile Treatment Centers".
- Honorable mention, international print: David Lamb, Bob Drogin, John Balzar, John-Thor Dahlburg, The Los Angeles Times, "Genocide and Horror in Rwanda".
- Honorable mention, radio: Mary Jeffries, WHAS, Louisville, Kentucky, "Her Brother's Keeper: A Portrait of Sister Kathleen".
- Honorable mention, TV: DeWitt Sage, David Fanning, WGBH "Frontline", Boston, 'A Place for Madness".
- Ted Rall of Chronicle Features

1996

- Photography: Steve Jessmore, The Saginaw News, "Blind Faith"

1997

- International TV: Stone Phillips, Grace Kahng, Neal Shapiro, NBC "Dateline", "Toy Story".
- Cartoon: Doug Marlette, Newsday.

1998

- Lifetime achievement: Gene Roberts.
- Grand prize and domestic print: Mario Rossilli, Josh Zimmer, The Clarion Ledger, Jackson, Mississippi, "AIDS Hope: Mississippi's Despair".
- Grand prize runner-up, international TV: Mandy Jacobson, Cinemax, "Calling the Ghosts".
- Domestic photojournalism: Clarence Williams, Los Angeles Times, "Orphans of Addiction".
- Domestic photojournalism: Daniel A. Anderson, Motel Children
- Dan Perkins (Tom Tomorrow)
- Domestic print: Sonny Kleinfeld, The New York Times, "A Room of His Own".
- Domestic radio: Shirley Jahad, Shomari Kress, Cecilia Vaisman, Gary Covino, Mary Gaffney, Johanna Zorn, WBEZ-FM, Chicago, "Picture Me Rolling".
- Domestic TV: John Baynard, Tom Ryder, Denny Houghton, Judith Stoia, Clint Bramesco, WGBH, Boston, "Holding On: A Love Story from the Streets".
- International print: Nicholas D. Kristof, The New York Times, "Everyday Killers".
- International radio: Jennifer Ludden, Loren Jenkins, Michael Sullivan, Paul Glickman, National Public Radio, "Coverage of Rwanda and Zaire / Congo".
- International photojournalism: Joe Stefanchik, The Dallas Morning News, "A Hidden Danger".
- College student: Melody Martz, The Sentinel, North Idaho College, "The Coeur d'Alene Tribe Comes Home".
- High school student: Andrea Prisby, Elise Erickson, The Vantage Point, Hudsonville High School, Michigan, "Picking Apples and Learning English".
- Runner-up, TV, CBS "60 Minutes", "Strive".
- Honorable mention, domestic radio: Joe Richman, National Public Radio, "Teenage Diaries".
- Honorable mention, international print: Robin Wright, The Los Angeles Times, "The Global Disadvantaged".

1999

- Grand prize: Mary Hargrove, Linda Satter, Patrick Henry, The Arkansas Democrat Gazette, "Juvenile Justice: The War Within".
- Domestic radio: Laurie Block, Jay Allison, National Public Radio, "Beyond Affliction: The Disability History Project".
- Domestic cartoon: Joel Pett, The Lexington Herald Leader.
- Domestic TV: Tom Bettag, John Baynard, ABC News "Nightline", "Street Doctors".
- International print: Bay Fang, U.S. News & World Report, "China's Stolen Wives".
- International TV: Sheila Nevins, Kate Blewett, Brian Woods, HBO, "Innocents Lost".
- International photojournalism: Ben Van Hook, Life magazine, "Roberto / When I Learned to Dance".
- Honorable mention, domestic TV: Bill Whitaker, Robert Hollander, CBS News "Sunday Morning", "Something in the Air".

=== 2000–2009 ===
2000

The 32nd Annual Awards were awarded in 2000 for coverage in 1999. Award winners were:

Award	Name	Title	Organization
Grand Prize and International Print:	Peter Finn	"Kosovo"	The Washington Post
Domestic Print:	Todd Richissin	"Charlie Squad"	The Baltimore Sun
Domestic Photojournalism:	Eugene Garcia	"In His Brothers Arms"	The Orange County Register
International Photojournalism:	Essdras M. Suarez	"Osveli's Story"	Rocky Mountain News
Domestic TV:	Geraldo Rivera, Susan Farkas	"Women in Prison: Nowhere to Hide"	NBC News
International TV:	Diane Sawyer	"The Unwanted Children of Russia"	20/20 (ABC News)
International Radio:	Maria Emilia Martin	"The Betrayal of Sister Dianna Ortiz"	Latino USA (KUT-FM)
Domestic Radio:	John Biewen	"The Forgotten 14 Million"	American RadioWorks
Domestic cartoon:	Ted Rall		Universal Press Syndicate
Honorable Mention, Photojournalism:	Mona Reeder	"A People in Peril"	The Arizona Republic
Lifetime Achievement:	Jack Nelson		The Los Angeles Times

2001

The 33rd Annual Awards were awarded in 2001 for coverage in 2000. Award winners were:

Award	Name	Title	Organization
Grand prize and domestic TV:	Edward Pinder	"Master Teacher"	Nightline (ABC News)
Domestic photojournalism:	Matt Rainey	"After The Fire"	The Star-Ledger
International photojournalism:	Dudley Brooks	"Thou Shalt Not Kill"	The Washington Post
International print:	Steve Coll	"Peace Without Justice"	The Washington Post
Domestic print:	Rick Tulsky	"Uncertain Refuge"	San Jose Mercury News
Honorable Mention, domestic print:	Staff	"Paper Shield"	York Daily Record
Domestic TV:	Edward Pinder	"Master Teacher"	Nightline (ABC News)
International TV:		"Srebrenica / A Cry from the Grave"	WNET (Thirteen)
Domestic radio:	Katie Davis	"Throw That Smoke"	This American Life (WBEZ)
Domestic cartoon:	Matt Davies		The Journal News
International radio:	John Biewen, Deborah George	"Engineering Crops in a Needy World"	Minnesota Public Radio
College:	Ivan O'Mahoney, Thomas Loudon, Constanza Santa Maria,	"Vieques, Time to Decide"	Columbia University
Honorable Mention, college	Beth A. "Vivi" Abrams	"On Deadly Ground"	Northwestern University
High School broadcast	Matt Johnson	"A Day in the Life of a Child with Downs Syndrome"	Centennial High School (Circle Pines, Minnesota)
Honorable Mention, High school print	Ashley Barker	"People Taking Action Against Poverty"	Greenbrier West High School (Charmco, West Virginia)
Lifetime achievement	Herb Block		The Washington Post

2002

The 34th Annual Awards were awarded in 2002 for coverage in 2001. Award winners were:

Award	Name	Title	Organization
Grand Prize and Domestic Print	Sari Horwitz, Scott Higham, Sarah Cohen	"The District's Lost Children"	The Washington Post
International Print Prize	David Finkel	"Invisible Journeys"	The Washington Post
Domestic TV	Morley Safer, Catherine Olian	"Schools for the Homeless"	60 Minutes (CBS News)
Domestic TV	Christiane Amanpour, Andrew Tkach	"Sleeping Sickness"	60 Minutes (CBS News)
Domestic Photojournalism Prize	Sheila Springsteen	"Witness to His Mother's Murder"	Home News Tribune
International Photojournalism Prize	Bill Greene	"The Lost Boys of Sudan"	The Boston Globe
Domestic Radio Prize	(Radio Rookies)		WNYC
International Radio Prize	Sandy Tolan	"Roots of Resentment in the Arab World"	Homelands Productions
Cartoon Prize	Signe Wilkinson		Philadelphia Daily News
College Prize	Scott Spilky	"The Clinic Crash"	The Daily Illini (University of Illinois)
High School Print Prize	Bonnie Gallagher	"Student's Plight Causes Flight from Homeland"	Franklin Community High School (Franklin, Indiana)
High School Broadcast Prize (in partnership with Channel One Network)	Kirk Hadden, Eric Hernando, Erin Neal, Rachel Osborn, and Ashley Reynolds	"Poverty in the Ozarks: Cycle of Despair"	Hillcrest High School (Springfield, Missouri)
International Photojournalism Honorable Mention	Hilda Perez, Mike Stocker, and A. Enrique Valentin	"Witness to an Epidemic"	South Florida Sun-Sentinel
Domestic Print Honorable Mention	Ruth Teichroeb	"Decades of Abuse"	The Seattle Post-Intelligencer
Domestic Radio Honorable Mention	Helen Borten	"The Prison Cure"	Public Radio International
College Honorable Mention	Paul Smith	"Swept into Poverty"	University Daily Kansan (University of Kansas)
High School Print Honorable Mention (in partnership with the National Scholastic Press Association)	Rami Daud	"Helping the Homeless"	Lakewood High School (Lakewood, Ohio)
High School Broadcast Honorable Mention (in partnership with Channel One Network)		"Miracle on East 9th Street"	Columbia Central High School (Columbia, Tennessee)

2003

The 35th Annual Awards were awarded in 2003 for coverage in 2002. Award winners were:

Award	Name	Title	Organization
Grand Prize and International Print and Photojournalism	Sonia Nazario, Don Bartletti	"A Boy Left Behind"	Los Angeles Times
Domestic Print	Connie Schultz	"The Burden of Innocence"	The Plain Dealer
Domestic Photojournalism	J. Albert Diaz	"When Minimum Wage Isn't Enough"	The Miami Herald
International TV	Ted Koppel, Kim Jung-eun	"Hidden Lives"	Nightline (ABC News)
Domestic TV	Ofra Bikel	"An Ordinary Crime"	PBS Frontline
International Radio	Kristin McHugh	"Kosovo's Pied Piper: The Liz Shropshire Story"	Common Ground Radio
Domestic Radio	Anthony Brooks	"Testing DNA and the Death Penalty: Inside Out"	WBUR-FM
Cartoon	Dan Perkins ("Tom Tomorrow")	"This Modern World"	
College	Adam Pracht	"Hiding in Plain Sight"	University Daily Kansan (University of Kansas)
High School Print	Victoria D. Williams	"Overcoming Long Odds"	Panther Prints, Duncanville High School (Duncanville, Texas)
High School Broadcast		"Opportunities"	Texas Senior High School (Texarkana, Texas)
Domestic TV Honorable Mention	Denise DiIanni	"Eye on Education: A Day in the Life"	WGBH-TV
International Photojournalism Honorable Mention	John Kaplan	"Transcending Torture"	St. Petersburg Times
Domestic Photojournalism Honorable Mention	Ted Jackson	"Leap Year"	The Times-Picayune
Domestic Radio Honorable Mention	Stacy Abramson	"Youth Portraits"	Sound Portraits
Lifetime Achievement	Daniel Schorr		National Public Radio

2004

The 36th Annual Awards were awarded in 2004 for coverage in 2003. Award winners were:

Award	Name	Title	Organization
Grand Prize	Rachel Dretzin, Barak Goodman, Muriel Soenens	"Failure to Protect"	Frontline (WGBH-TV)
International Print:	Joseph Kahn	"The World's Sweatshop"	The New York Times
International Honorable Mention:	Anthony Shadid	"The Soul of Iraq"	The Washington Post
Domestic Print:	Staff Writers	"Modern Day Slavery"	The Palm Beach Post
Domestic Photojournalism:	Brant Ward	"Shame of the City"	San Francisco Chronicle
International Photojournalism:	Bradley E. Clift	"The Sacrifice of Ganansol"	Hartford Courant
Cartoon:	John Sherffius		
Domestic Radio:	Cameron Lawrence, John Gregory	"Sisters in Pain"	Kentucky Public Radio
College Print:	Sarah Schaffer	"Outside the Fence"	Capital News Service (University of Maryland, College Park)
High School Print:	Alicia Okland	"Megan's Story"	Century High School (Bismarck, North Dakota)
High School Broadcast:	Joe Morgan	"What God Had Put on My Heart..."	Washington High School (Washington, Missouri)

2005

The 37th Annual Awards were awarded in 2005 for coverage in 2004. Award winners were:

Award	Name	Title	Organization
Grand Prize:	Tracy Weber, Charles Ornstein, Mitchell Landsberg, Steve Hymon, Robert Gauthier	"The Troubles at King/Drew."	Los Angeles Times
International Print:	Celia Williams Dugger	"Helping the Poor"	The New York Times
Domestic TV:	Ofra Bikel	"The Plea"	Frontline (WGBH-TV)
International TV:	Greg Barker	"Ghosts of Rwanda"	Frontline (WGBH-TV)
International Photojournalism:	Manny Crisostomo	"The Leftover People"	The Sacramento Bee
Domestic Radio:	Daniel Zwerdling	"Immigrant Detainees Allege Abuse"	National Public Radio
International Radio:	Joe Richman, Sue Johnson	"Mandela: An Audio History"	National Public Radio
Cartoon:	Mark Fiore		
College Print:	Journalism Students	"Sovereignty"	University of Montana
High School Print:	Amanda Blakely	"Ms. Mary and the Big Blue House"	Crandall High School (Crandall, Texas)
High School Broadcast:	Quinci Adams and Carrie Lutz	"A Safe Haven"	Hillcrest High School (Springfield, Missouri)

2006

The 38th Annual Awards were awarded in 2006 for coverage in 2005. Award winners were:

Award	Name	Title	Organization
Grand Prize	Karen O'Connor, Miri Navasky	"The New Asylums"	Frontline (WGBH-TV)
Domestic Print:	Cam Simpson	"Pipeline of Peril"	Chicago Tribune
International Print:	John Lantigua, Christine Evans, Christine Stapleton	"A Cloud over Florida: Hidden Pesticide Problems"	The Palm Beach Post
Domestic Photojournalism:	Steve Liss	"No Place for Children: Voices from Juvenile Detention"	Time
International Radio:	Steve Inskeep, Jim Wallace, Bruce Auster, Kimberly Jones	"The Price of African Oil"	National Public Radio
Cartoon:	John Backderf	"The City"	
College Print:	Kara Couch	"I don't want to be a guy"	Somerset Community College (Somerset, Kentucky)
High School Print:	Samantha Offerdahl	"Super Senior"	Century High School (Bismarck, North Dakota)
High School Broadcast:	Aliy Bossert, Kevin McMillan	"Not Bad Kids"	Roane County High School (Spencer, West Virginia)

2007

The 39th Annual Awards were awarded in 2007 for coverage in 2006. Award winners were:

Award	Name	Title	Organization
Grand Prize:	Donald Gerard McNeil, Jr., Celia W. Dugger	"Disease on the Brink"	The New York Times
Domestic Print:	George Pawlaczyk, Beth Hundsdorfer	"Lethal Lapses"	Belleville News-Democrat
Domestic Photography:	Matt Black	"From Dust to Dust"	The Los Angeles Times
Domestic TV:	Diane Sawyer	"A Call to Action: Saving Our Children"	ABC News
Domestic Radio:	Daniel Zwerdling	"Mental Anguish and the Military"	National Public Radio
International Photography:	Mike Stocker, Joe Amon	"AIDS Orphans"	South Florida Sun-Sentinel
International TV:	Renata Simone	"The Age of AIDS"	Frontline (WGBH-TV)
Editorial Cartoon	Clay Bennett		Christian Science Monitor
College Print:	Ruth Bradley	"Lubbock in the Dark"	The Daily Toreador (Texas Tech University)
College Radio:	Scott Detrow	"Treating the Rainbow Nation: AIDS in South Africa"	WFUV (Fordham University)
High School Broadcast:	Lillian Olive, Rachel Miles	"Thread of Hope"	Hillcrest High School (Springfield, Missouri)

2008

The 40th Annual Awards were awarded in 2008 for coverage in 2007. Award winners were:

Award	Name	Title	Organization
Grand Prize:	Dana Priest and Anne Hull	"The Other Walter Reed"	The Washington Post
International Print:	Robyn Dixon	"Zimbabwe's Pain"	The Los Angeles Times
Domestic Photojournalism:	Mona Reeder	"The Bottom Line"	The Dallas Morning News
International Photojournalism:	Mary F. Calvert	"Lost Daughters: Sex Selection in India"	The Washington Times
Domestic Radio:	Alix Spiegel	"Stuck and Suicidal in a Post-Katrina Trailer Park"	National Public Radio
Domestic TV:	Steve Kroft, Ira Rosen, John Solomon	"Evidence of Injustice"	The Washington Times and CBS News' 60 Minutes
International TV:	Kira Kay, Jason Maloney	"Uganda's Silent War"	PBS NewsHour and HDNet World Report
Cartoon:	Signe Wilkinson		Philadelphia Daily News
College Broadcast:	Rachel Anderson, Megan Carrick, Justin Peterson and Chris Welch	"Breaking Down Barriers"	University of Nebraska–Lincoln
High School Print:	D. J. Shewmaker	"Students Show Outstanding Ability"	Francis Howell North High School (Saint Charles, Missouri)
High School Broadcast:	Brittany Gomes, Mhanivel Moresca, Samuel Balecha, and Laurissa Asuega	"Home is Where the Heart Is"	Waianae High School (Wai'anae, Hawai'i)

2009

The 41st Annual Awards were awarded in 2009 for coverage in 2008. Award winners were:

Award	Name	Title	Organization
Grand Prize (International Photo):	Carol Guzy	"Birth and Death"	The Washington Post
International Print	Clifford J. Levy	"Kremlin Rules"	The New York Times
Domestic Print	Staff Reporters	"The Cruelest Cuts"	The Charlotte Observer
Domestic Photo	Carlos Javier Ortiz	"Too Young to Die"	Freelance
Domestic TV	Sherry Jones	"Torturing Democracy"	Washington Media Associates
International TV	Marc Rosenwasser, Michael J. Kavanagh, Taylor Krauss and Lisa Biagiotti	"War in DR Congo"	Worldfocus
Cartoon	Jack Ohman		The Oregonian
College Print	Cronkite Depth Reporting Class	"Divided Families"	Walter Cronkite School of Journalism and Mass Communication, Arizona State University
College Broadcast	Sue Kopen Katcef	"Out of the Shadows"	WMUC-FM (University of Maryland, College Park)
High School Broadcast	Jacqui Powell and Laura Pait	"More Than Just Food"	Elizabethtown High School (Elizabethtown, Kentucky)
High School Print	Ryan Firle	"Cancer Cannot Silence Dr. Bob's Courage"	Francis Howell North High School (Saint Charles, Missouri)

=== 2010–2020 ===
2010

The 42nd Annual Awards were awarded in 2010 for coverage in 2009. Award winners were:

Award	Name	Title	Organization
Grand Prize (International TV)	Rebecca Cammisa	"Which Way Home"	Home Box Office:
Domestic Print	Laura Bauer, Mike McGraw, and Mark Morris	"A New Slavery: Human Trafficking in America"	Kansas City Star:
International Print	Farnaz Fassihi	"Hearts, Mind, and Blood: The Battle for Iran"	The Wall Street Journal
Domestic Photography	Carol Guzy	"No Greater Love"	The Washington Post
International Photography	Sarah Voisin	"In Mexico's war on drugs, battle lines are drawn in chalk"	The Washington Post:
Domestic TV	Diane Sawyer	"A Hidden America: Children of the Mountains"	ABC News 20/20:
International Radio	Rachel Krantz	"In the Kennel – Uncovering a Navy Unit's Culture of Abuse"	Youth Radio Staff, and NPR's All Things Considered Staff
Domestic Radio	Miguelina Diaz, Keith Tingman, & Amon Frazier	"This is the South Bronx"	WNYC Radio Rookies:
Cartoon	Bill Day Series of cartoons,	United Feature Syndicate	
College Print	David Kempa	"Crossing Lines"	ASU News 21:
High School Print	Isaac Stanley-Becker	"The Sad Story of How a Gay High School got Derailed"	U-High Midway

2011

The 43rd Annual Awards were awarded in 2011 for coverage in 2010. Award winners were:

Award	Name	Title	Organization
International Print	Joe Mozingo, Scott Kraft, and Tracy Wilkinson	"Disaster in Haiti"	The Los Angeles Times
Domestic Print	Carol Rosenberg	"Guantanamo Bay"	The Miami Herald
Domestic Photo	Laura Antrim Caskey	"Dragline"	Freelance
Domestic TV	James Gandolfini	"Wartorn"	HBO
International TV	Dan Rather and Jenny Nordberg, Dan Rather Reports	"The Price of an Afghan Bride"	HDNet
Cartoon	Gary Varvel	"The Path to Hope"	The Indianapolis Star
College Print	Student Reporting Team of University of Mississippi	"The Roads of Broken Dreams: Can a New Delta Arise from the Rot of the Old South?"	Meek School of Journalism and New Media
High School Print	Benjamin Breuner and Michael Weinstein	"Targeting Teens"	The Redwood Bark Redwood High School (Larkspur, California)
High School Broadcast	Aaron Oshiro, Cody Kau, Michael Gooch, and Jenna Munoz	"Farming Knowledge"	Waianae High School (Wai'anae, Hawai'i)

2012

The 44th annual award winners:

Award	Name	Title	Organization
Grand Prize and International TV	May Ying Welsh (Cinematographer, Writer, & director), Hassan Mahfood (Field Producer), and Jon Blair (Executive Producer)	"Bahrain: Shouting in the Dark"	Al Jazeera English
Domestic TV	Yoav Potash	"Crime After Crime"	The Oprah Winfrey Network (OWN)
Radio	Laura Sullivan and Amy Walters	"Native Foster Care Lost Children, Shattered Families" by	National Public Radio (NPR)
International Photography	Michael Robinson Chavez	"Broken Promise: Gold Mining in Peru's High Andes"	The Los Angeles Times Magazine
Domestic Photography	Katie Falkenberg	A Lasting Toll	The Los Angeles Times
International Print	Tom Lasseter	"China: Living Under the Yoke"	McClatchy Newspapers
Domestic Print	Meg Kissinger	"Imminent Danger"	Milwaukee Journal Sentinel
Cartoon	Stephanie McMillan	"The Beginning of the American Fall and Code Green"	South Florida Sun-Sentinel
College		"Stateless in the Dominican Republic"	Arizona State University, Walter Cronkite School of Journalism & Mass Communication
High School Print	Anna Sturla and Daniel Tutt	"A Light on Latinos"	Davis Senior High School
High School Broadcast	Jared Iler and Anna Reed	"The Power of One"	Cody High School

2013

The 45th annual award winners:

Award	Name	Title	Organization
Grand Prize/Domestic Print	Ames Alexander, Karen Garloch, Joseph Neff, David Raynor, Jim Walser, and Steve Riley	"Prognosis: Profits"	The Charlotte Observer and The News & Observer
International TV	Catherine Olian and Natalie Morales	"Lobster Trap"	NBC News/Rock Center with Brian Williams
Domestic TV	Jezza Newman	"Poor Kids"	PBS/Frontline
New Media	Kenneth Weiss and Rick Loomis	"Beyond 7 Billion"	Los Angeles Times
Radio	Bob Edwards	"An 'Occupational Hazard': Rape in the Military"	The Bob Edwards Show, SiriusXM
Photography	Marc Asnin	"Embracing Uncle Charlie"	CNN Photos
International Print	Charles Duhigg	"The iEconomy"	The New York Times
Cartoon	Jen Sorensen		
College	Patricia Thompson	"M-Powered: University of Mississippi Students Learn through Service in Belize"	University of Mississippi
High School Print	Alexis Christo	"Cheering Through It All"	North Star, Francis Howell North High School

2014

The 46th annual award winners:

Award	Name	Title	Organization
Domestic TV	Andrés Cediel, Lowell Bergman, Lauren Rosenfeld, Bernice Yeung, Susanne Reber, Grace Rubenstein, Stephanie Mechura, Raney Aronson, Juan Rendon, Isaac Lee	"Rape in the Fields/ Violación de un Sueño,"	UC Berkeley IRP, CIR, FRONTLNE, and Univision
International TV	Anjali Kamat, Laila Al-Arian, Mathieu Skene, Warwick Meade, Tim Grucza, Andy Bowley and Fault Lines Staff	"Made in Bangladesh,"	Al Jazeera
Domestic Print	Debbie Cenziper, Michael Sallah, and Steven Rich	"Homes for the Taking: Liens, Loss and Profiteers,"	The Washington Post
International Print	Michael Smith, Tim Culpan, Alex Webb, Anatoly Kurmanaev, Jonathan Neumann	"Tungsten's Tainted Trail, "	Bloomberg Markets
Domestic Photography	Rick Loomis	"Private Wars,"	Los Angeles Times
International Photography	Robin Hammond	"CONDEMNED: Mental Health in African Countries in Crisis,"	
Radio	Quil Lawrence, Bruce Auster, and Marisa Peñaloza	"Life After War: Coverage of Veterans,"	NPR News
New Media	Thomas Mucha, Solana Pyne, David Case, Patrick Winn, and Jonah Kessel	"Myanmar Emerges",	Los Angeles Times
Cartoon	David Horsey	"Portfolio by David Horsey,"	Los Angeles Times
College	Varsha Ramakrishnan	"A Broken Promise: Dowry Violence in India,"	Johns Hopkins Public Health Magazine
High School Broadcast	Kaley Prier, Savanna Steffen, John Harmon, Kara Mullen, Kelsey Williams, Caleb Brown, Cody House, Ryan Lindsey, and Breanna Feemster	"Homeless in the Heartland,"	Hillcrest High School, Springfield, MO
High School Print	Linda Sankat and Autumn Spanne	"Stop-and-Frisk: Time for a Change,"	Youth Communication, YCteen

2015

The 47th annual award winners:

Award	Name	Title	Organization
High School Broadcast:	John Alpert and Team	"Our Cameras, Our Stories,"	Downtown Community Television Center, New York
High School Print:	Gwyneth Henke	"Eyes on Ferguson,"	The Globe, Clayton High School, Clayton, MO
College:	Alec Klein and Team	"Wrongful Convictions,"	Medill Justice Project, Northwestern University, Evanston, IL
Cartoon:	Darrin Bell	"Darrin Bell 2014 Editorial Cartoons,"	The Washington Post Writers Group
New Media:	T. Christian Miller and Jonathan Jones	"Firestone and the Warlord,"	ProPublica and PBS Frontline
Radio:	Carrie Johnson, Marisa Peñalosa, and Beth Donovan "Boxed In: When the Punishment No Longer Fits the Crime,"	NPR News	
Domestic Photography:	Michael Robinson Chavez	"California's Dust Bowl,"	The Los Angeles Times
International Photography:	Michel du Cille	"Ebola: A Desperate Struggle,"	The Washington Post
Domestic Print:	Julie K. Brown	"Cruel and Unusual,"	Miami Herald
International Print:	Richard Marosi and Don Bartletti	"Product of Mexico,"	The Los Angeles Times
Domestic TV:	Daniel Edge	"Solitary Nation," ,	PBS Frontline and WGBH
International TV:	Jeremy Schaap, Beein Gim, Andy Tennant, Michael Baltierra, and Tim Horgan	"Qatar's World Cup,"	ESPN E:60

2016

The 48th annual award winners:

Award	Name	Title	Organization
High School Broadcast	Becca Kristofferson, Jacob Jaeger, Dylan Goodman, and Seamus Levin,	"The Jellybean Jar of Life: Nick's Story,"	Mexico High School, Missouri
High School Print	Anthony Kristensen	"What One Family Can Never Forget,"	North Star, Francis Howell North High School, Missouri
College Journalism	Depth Reporting Class	"Land of Broken Promises,"	Meek School of Journalism and New Media, University of Mississippi
Domestic Print	Jessica Silver-Greenberg, Michael Corkery, Robert Gebeloff, and Christine Kay	"Beware the Fine Print,"	The New York Times
International Print	Martha Mendoza, Margie Mason, Robin McDowell, and Esther Htusan	"Seafood from Slaves,"	The Associated Press
Domestic Photography	Matt Black	"The Geography of Poverty,"	MSNBC
International Photography	Carolyn Cole	"Europe's Migrant Crisis,"	Los Angeles Times
Radio	Daniel Zwerdling	"Injured Nurses,"	NPR News
New Media	Neela Banerjee, John Cushman, Jr., David Hasemyer, and Lisa Song	"Exxon: The Road Not Taken",	InsideClimate News
Cartoon	Angelo Lopez	"Editorial Cartoons,"	Philippines Today
Domestic TV	Laura Poitras	"Citizenfour,"	HBO
International TV	Edward Watts, Raney Aronson, John Bredar, Andrew Metz, and Evan Williams	"Escaping Isis,"	FRONTLINE/WGHB

2017

The 49th annual award winners:

Award	Name	Title	Organization
High School Broadcast	Josh Horned, Chloe Durham and Rachel Pfeifer	"A Whole New World,"	HTV Magazine, Hillcrest High School, Springfield, Missouri
High School Print	Anthony Kristensen	"A Ball, A Team, A War and a Dream,"	Francis Howell North High School, St. Charles, Missouri
College Journalism	Amber Baesler, Lauren Brown-Hulme, Jake Crandall, Vanessa Daves, Matt Hanson, Calla Kessler, Alyssa Mae, Marcella Mercer, Natasha Rausch, James Wooldridge	"Wounds of White Clay: Nebraska's Shameful Legacy,"	University of Nebraska-Lincoln, Nebraska
Print - Domestic	Josh Salman, Emily le Coz and Elizabeth Johnson	"Bias on the Bench,"	Sarasota Herald Tribune, Florida
Print - International	Ben Taub	"The Assad Files,"	The New Yorker
Photography - Domestic	Laurie Skrivan	"Toxic Stress: A Cycle of Poverty and Gun Violence,"	St. Louis Post-Dispatch, Missouri
Photography - International	Daniella Zalcman	"Signs of Your Identity,"	Various Publications
Radio	Fernanda Echávarri, Marlon Bishop and Maria Hinojosa	"The Strange Death of José de Jesús,"	Latino USA
New Media	Univision News Digital	"Vacation in No Man's Sea,"	
Cartoon	Mike Thompson	"The Flint Water Scandal,"	Detroit Free Press
TV - Domestic	Executive Producer Keith Summa; Senior Producer: Nina Alvarez; Producer: Alissa Figueroa; Associate Producer: Alcione Gonzales; Correspondent: Natasha Del Toro; Supervising Producer: Justine Gubar	"The Naked Truth: Rigged,"	Fusion
TV - International	produced and directed by Sharmeen Obaid-Chinoy	"A Girl in the River: The Price of Forgiveness,"	HBO
Media Advocacy Award	Bill Moyers Executive Editor—Bill Moyers. Executive Producer -- Judy Doctoroff O'Neill Producers—by Marc Levin, Mark Benjamin, and Rolake Bamgbose	"Rikers"	Schumann Media Center and Brick City TV in association with Public Square Media

2018

The 50th annual award winners:

Award	Name	Title	Organization
High School Broadcast	Jessie Nguyen, Carlin Bills, and Surya Hendry	"I Wasn't Comfortable: Being a Student of Color in Garfield High's Advanced Classes"	KUOW Puget Sound Public Radio
High School Print	Sarah Zimmerman	"One Incredible Goal"	Francis Howell North High School, St. Charles, Missouri
College Journalism	Mark Boyle, Quanny Carr, Michael Errigo, Abby Mergenmeier, Jenna Milliner-Waddell, John Powers, Talia Richman, Jacob Taylor, Naema Ahmed, Ana Hurler, Helen Lyons, and Daniel Trielli	"Home Sick"	Capital News Service and Baltimore Urban Affairs Reporting Class
Print - Domestic	Jodi Kantor, Megan Twohey, Emily Steel, Michael S. Schmidt, Susan Chira, Catrin Einhorn, Katie Benner, Rachel Abrams, Ellen Gabler, Susan Dominus, Jim Rutenberg, Steve Eder, Melena Ryzik, and Cara Buckley	"Harassed"	The New York Times
Print - International	Todd Pitman, Kristen Gelineau, Robin McDowell, Esther Htusan, Muneeza Naqvi, Maye-E Wong, Rishabh Raj Jain, Bernat Armangue, Gemunu Amarasinghe, and Dar Yasin	"Rohingya Exodus"	Associated Press (with support of The Pulitzer Center)
Photography - Domestic	Matt Black	"Maria's Bodies"	New York Magazine
Photography - International	Michael Robinson Chavez, Joshua Partlow, Nick Kirpatrick, and MaryAnne Golon	"Mexico's Misery"	The Washington Post
Radio	Pat Duggins, Stan Ingold, and Alex AuBuchon	"Help Wanted: Alabama's Rural Health Care Crisis"	Alabama Public Radio
New Media	Ty McCormick, Nichole Sobecki, Peter Tinti, Jill Filipovic, Cameron Abadi and staff	"Europe Slams its Gates"	Foreign Policy
Cartoon	Ruben Bolling, Andrews McMeel Syndication, Boing Boing, Daily Kos, and GoComics	"Tom the Dancing Bug"	Syndicated by Andrews McMeel Syndication
TV - Domestic	John Ridley, Jeanmarie Condon, Fatima Curry, Melia Patria, and Colin Rich	"Let it Fall: Los Angeles 1982-1992"	ABC News, Lincoln Square Productions
TV - International	Ramita Navai, Paddy Wells, Raney Aronson, Dan Edge, Andrew Metz, Eamonn Matthews, Monica Garnsey, Mais Al-Bayaa, Natalie Triebwasser, John Moratiel, Ella Newton, and Steve Audette	"Iraq Uncovered"	FRONTLINE in association with Channel 4

2019

The 51st annual award winners:

Award	Name	Title	Organization
High School Broadcast	Emily Peebles, Ellen Fountain, Hayden Pyle, Kaylinn Clotfelter, and Sophia Vaughn	"A Bay 11 Podcast Special: Wildfire"	Bay 11 Podcast, Hillcrest High School, Springfield, Missouri
High School Print	Jacob LaGesse, Michael Bernard, and Gracie Morris	"Trafficked"	The Globe, Clayton High School, Clayton, Missouri
College Journalism		"Hate in America"	Carnegie-Knight News21, Arizona State University
Print - Domestic		"Torn Apart: Immigration in the Era of Trump"	Associated Press
Print - International	Declan Walsh, Tyler Hicks, Robert F. Worth, Lynsey Addario, Nicolas Kristof, Jeffrey E. Stern, David D. Kirkpatrick, Ben Hubbard, Mark Mazzetti, Eric P. Schmitt, Helene Cooper, Thomas Gibbons-Neff, Malachy Browne, Kate Kelly, Mark Landler and David Botti.	"Saudi Arabia's Tragic War in Yemen"	The New York Times
Photography - Domestic	Carolyn Van Houten	"The Road to Asylum: Inside the Migrant Caravans"	The Washington Post
Photography - International	Marcus Yam and Alan Hagman	"The Great March of Return"	The Los Angeles Times
Radio	Hank Klibanoff, Dave Barasoain and John Haas	"Buried Truths"	WABE (NPR member station)
New Media	Hannah Dreier	"Trapped in Gangland"	ProPublica, in collaboration with New York magazine, Newsday, This American Life and The New York Times Magazine
Cartoon	Mark Fiore	"Mark Fiore editorial cartoons"	KQED News and online news websites
TV - Domestic	Rebecca Cammisa, James B. Freydberg, Larissa Bills, Unseen Hand, Bill Benenson, Laurie Benenson, Rose Villaseñor, Adilia Aguilar, Mary Recine, Olivia Negrón, Sheila Nevins, Sara Bernstein, Madeleine Gavin, Claudia Raschke, and Robert Miller	"Atomic Homefront"	HBO
TV - International	Ramita Navai, Sam Collyns, Dan Edge, Andrew Metz, and Raney Aronson	"UN Sex Abuse Scandal"	FRONTLINE
Photography - Special Recognition	John Moore	"Undocumented"	Getty Images

2020

The 52nd annual award winners:

Award	Name	Title	Organization
High School Journalism	Nina Lavezzo-Stecopoulos	"Black Students Nearly Two Times as Likely to be Suspended as White Peers in the ICCSD"	The Little Hawk, Iowa City High School, Iowa City, Iowa
College Journalism	Staff of News21	"State of Emergency"	Carnegie-Knight News21, Walter Cronkite School of Journalism and Mass Communication
Domestic Print	Michael Keller, Gabriel J.X. Dance, Nellie Bowles and Kholood Eid	"Exploited"	The New York Times
International Print	Craig Whitlock	"The Afghanistan Papers"	The Washington Post
Domestic Photography	Ricky Carioti	"One More Year on the Farm: A Minnesota Farm Family Fights to Save Its Land"	The Washington Post
International Photography	Rodrigo Abd	"Venezuela on the Edge"	Associated Press
Radio	Staff of In the Dark	"In the Dark: The Path Home"	APM Reports (American Public Media investigative unit)
New Media	A.C. Thompson, Ginger Thompson, Melissa del Bosque, Jeff Ernsthausen, Robert Moore, Susan Schmidt, Maryam Jameel, Lucas Waldron, Katie Campbell and Dara Lind	"Inside the Border Patrol"	ProPublica
Cartoon	JD Crowe	"JD Crowe 2019 Work"	Alabama Media Group
International Television and John Seigenthaler Courage in Journalism Award	Staffs of FRONTLINE, Channel 4 and ITN Productions	"For Sama"	FRONTLINE (PBS) and WGBH (NPR affiliate)
Domestic Television and Grand Prize	"Broken Trust" staff, notably Maren Machles, Carrie Cochrane, Angela Hill, Suzette Brewer	"A Broken Trust"	Newsy

=== 2021-2022 ===
2021

The 53rd annual award winners:

Award	Name	Title	Organization
High School Print and New Voices for Justice	Satchel Walton, Cooper Walton and Payton Carns	"Bigoted Badges: How Hate and Violence are Embedded in Kentucky Law Enforcement Training"	Manual RedEye, duPont Manual High School, Louisville, Kentucky
High School Broadcast	Grant Johnson, Kacey Boston, Cristina Folsom and Maggie Hale	"The Pandemic Program"	Eagle Nation News, Prosper High School, Prosper, Texas
College Journalism	Staff of News21	Kids Imprisoned	Carnegie-Knight News21, Walter Cronkite School of Journalism and Mass Communication
Domestic Print and Grand Prize	Michael Anastasi and Mark Russell	"The Confederate Reckoning"	USA Today Network in the South
International Print	Margie Mason and Robin McDowell	"Fruits of Labor"	Associated Press
Domestic Photography	André Chung	"We Keep Us Safe"	VII Photo Agency
Radio	Amy Brittain, Reena Flores and Bishop Sand	"Canary: The Washington Post Investigates"	The Washington Post
New Media	Thomas Brennan, Kelly Kennedy and Ben Kalin	"Gag Order: How Marine Corps Culture Silenced a Victim of Sexual Assault"	The War Horse
Cartoon		"In/Vulnerable: Inequity in the Time of Pandemic"	Reveal (Center for Investigative Reporting podcast)
Domestic Television	Staff of MTV News, notably Steve Liss, Ben Hurvitz and Lily Neumeyer	"16 and Recovering"	MTV News
International Television and John Seigenthaler Courage in Journalism Award	David France	"Welcome to Chechnya"	HBO
Criminal Justice Reform	Staff of Reuters, notably Peter Eisler, Jason Szep, Linda So, Grant Smith and Ned Parker	"Dying Inside"	Reuters

2022

The 54th annual award winners:

Award	Name	Title	Organization
College Journalism		"Being Black In Lincoln"	University of Nebraska Lincoln College of Journalism
High School Print	Owen Auston-Babcock	"Unlivable Wages"	The Globe, Clayton High School
High School Broadcast	Jaela Burris	"The Talk"	Bay 11 Podcast, Hillcrest High School
Domestic Print and Grand Prize	Carol Marbin Miller, Daniel Chang and Emily Michot	"Birth and Betrayal"	The Miami Herald and ProPublica
International Print	Raffi Khatchadourian	"Ghost Walls"	The New Yorker
Domestic Photography	Joshua Lott	"Social Injustice"	The Washington Post
International Photography	Marcus Yam	"The Fall of Afghanistan"	The Los Angeles Times
New Media	Staff of The New York Times	"Airstrikes Gone Wrong"	The New York Times
Cartoon	Clay Jones	"Clay Jones Cartoons"	Claytoonz.com and CNN Opinion Newsletter
Domestic Television	Jennifer Gollan, Amina Waheed and Adrienne Haspel	"Unrelinquished: When Abusers Keep their Guns"	Al Jazeera English Fault Lines and Reveal (Center for Investigative Reporting podcast)
International Television	Ramona Diaz	"A Thousand Cuts"	FRONTLINE (PBS)
Criminal Justice Reform	Gina Barton, Daphne Duret, Brett Murphy and Jarrad Henderson	"Behind the Blue Wall"	USA Today
John Seigenthaler Courage in Journalism Award	Staff of The New York Times	"Airstrikes Gone Wrong"	The New York Times
