= Selwyn Raab =

American journalist, author and investigative reporter (1934–2025)

- Born: June 26, 1934; New York City, U.S.
- Died: March 4, 2025 (aged 90); New York City, U.S.
- Education: City College of New York
- Occupations: Journalist, writer, investigative reporter
- Spouse: Helene Lurie
- Children: 1
- Writing career
- Language: English
- Years active: 1955–2025
- Genres: Biography; History; Case studies
- Subjects: Organized Crime; US State & Local History; Reference
- Notable works: Justice in the Back Room; Mob Lawyer; Five Families: The Rise, Decline, and Resurgence of America's Most Powerful Mafia Empires

Selwyn Raab (June 26, 1934 – March 4, 2025) was an American journalist, author and investigative reporter for The New York Times. He wrote extensively about the American Mafia and criminal justice issues.

== Early life and education ==
Born in New York City on June 26, 1934, Raab grew up on Manhattan's Lower East Side, the son of Berdie (Glantz) and William Raab. His father was a bus driver from Austria and his mother was a homemaker from Poland; his family was Jewish. He attended Seward Park High School and later graduated from the City College of New York, where he received a B.A. degree in English literature in 1956. At City College he was campus correspondent for The Times and an editor of Observation Post, a student newspaper.

== Career ==
Raab got his first jobs as a reporter with the Bridgeport Sunday Herald newspaper in Bridgeport, Connecticut and The Star-Ledger newspaper in Newark, New Jersey.

=== New York World-Telegram and Sun (1960–1966) ===
From 1960 to 1966, he joined the New York World-Telegram and Sun. He was originally assigned as an education reporter. On the education beat he covered declining reading and mathematics test scores, attempts to unionize teachers and racial integration disputes until he discovered that mob-connected contractors were behind a major scandal concerning improper construction and renovation which endangered the safety of thousands of students in the school system. In 1964, he discovered that Dr. Chester M. Southam of the Jewish Chronic Disease Hospital in Brooklyn was injecting sick patients with cancer cells, while telling them that they were normal human cells. Southam was eventually convicted of fraud, deceit and unprofessional conduct.

Later, as an investigative reporter at the New York World-Telegram, he was instrumental in finding evidence that exonerated George Whitmore Jr. of false charges for having slain Janice Wylie and Emily Hoffert in the notorious Career Girl murders in 1963. He also uncovered evidence that led to the dismissal of a third murder accusation against Whitmore.

=== NBC News (1966–1971) ===
While producer and news editor for WNBC television news, (1966–1971), Raab also wrote a book about the Whitmore case, Justice in the Back Room, published in 1967. The book was nominated for an Edgar Award by the Mystery Writers of America for Best Fact Crime Book in 1968. Universal Studios bought the television rights, transforming Raab into a fictional detective named Theo Kojak, portrayed by Telly Savalas in the series Kojak. The series ran for five years. The series was spun off from the CBS television movie, The Marcus-Nelson Murders, which won two Emmy Awards in 1973.

=== The 51st State – WNET-13 (1971–1974) ===
In 1971, he became a reporter-producer at the public broadcasting television station WNET-13 on the news program The 51st State, where he continued working on the Whitmore case. He proved that Whitmore was elsewhere on the day of the killings and helped clear him. It took seven more years to locate a witness whose testimony exonerated Whitmore in 1973 from an unrelated attempted rape conviction. Whitmore was released from prison after serving nine years for a "wrong man" conviction for attempted rape. Raab received a New York Press Club Award for Outstanding Television Journalism for his work on the case. His work was also nominated for an Emmy Award for Outstanding Achievement in News Feature Reporting Within a Regularly Scheduled News Program for the feature Shooting Gallery aired on December 18, 1973 (WNET). He became Executive Producer of The 51st State until he left for The New York Times in 1974.

=== The New York Times (1974–2000) ===
In 1974, Raab became a metropolitan staff reporter for The New York Times where he covered criminal justice and government corruption stories, particularly those that involved the American Mafia. During this period, he exposed perjured testimony and police and prosecutorial misconduct surrounding the triple murder convictions of boxer Rubin "Hurricane" Carter and his co-defendant, John Artis, which led to the ultimate dismissal of all accusations against them. Both men were cleared after serving lengthy prison sentences.

Raab co-authored with Frank Ragano his 1994 memoir Mob Lawyer.

=== Five Families (2000–2025) ===
External videos
- Interview with Raab on Five Families, October 2, 2005, C-SPAN

Raab left the Times in 2000. His book, Five Families: The Rise, Decline, and Resurgence of America's Most Powerful Mafia Empires, was published in 2005 and was a New York Times Best Seller. He was a consultant on organized crime for TV documentaries, primarily on the History and Biography channels. He was involved as a consultant for the six-part series Inside the American Mob, being interviewed with prominent Cosa Nostra members as well as current and former FBI agents, US Attorneys and detectives who were heavily involved with the pursuit of the Mafia and giving first-person accounts of major events involving the mob. He was an adviser on scripts for the 10-part television series, The Making of the Mob: New York, based partly on Five Families, which premiered on June 15, 2015, on AMC. In August 2024, Selwyn appeared on the History Channel limited series American Godfather: The Five Families.

== Death ==
Raab died of intestinal complications in Manhattan, New York, on March 4, 2025, at the age of 90.

== Awards and honors ==
- Sigma Delta Chi Award for Excellence in Broadcast Journalism from the Society of Professional Journalists (1971, 1972)
- The New York Press Club Award for Outstanding Television Journalism (1973)
- New York State Associated Press Broadcaster Association Award (1973)
- The New York Press Club Best Feature Story Award (1984)
- The Heywood Broun Memorial Award from the American Newspaper Guild (1974)
- Page One Award from the Newspaper Guild of New York (1975)
- New York City Patrolmen's Benevolent Association Award (1985)
- Townsend Harris Medal for "Notable Achievement" from the City College of New York (2009)

== Bibliography ==
- Justice in the Back Room (1967)
- Mob Lawyer with Frank Ragano (1994)
- Five Families: The Rise, Decline, and Resurgence of America's Most Powerful Mafia Empires (2005)
