= Los Angeles Times Magazine =

US magazine

- Conductor Gustavo Dudamel on the magazine's August 6, 2009 cover.
- Editor: Annie Gilbar
- Categories: Newspaper supplement
- Frequency: Monthly
- Circulation: (as part of Sunday paper)
- Publisher: Eddy Hartenstein
- First issue: January 2000
- Final issue: June 3, 2012
- Company: Los Angeles Times
- Country: United States
- Language: English
- Website: www.latimesmagazine.com

The Los Angeles Times Magazine (also shortened to just LA) was a monthly magazine which supplemented the Sunday edition of the Los Angeles Times newspaper on the first Sunday of the month. The magazine focused on stories and photos of people, places, style, and other cultural affairs occurring in Los Angeles and its surrounding cities and communities. The Los Angeles Times Magazine was the successor to West Magazine, and was published between 2000 and 2012.

== History ==
=== West magazine ===
From 1967 to 1972, the Los Angeles Times produced a Sunday supplement called West magazine. West was recognized for its art design, which was directed by Mike Salisbury. Covers were illustrated by the likes of Milton Glaser, Robert Grossman, Edward Sorel, John Van Hamersveld, Richard Weigand, and Sailisbury himself. West also published the work of underground cartoonists Victor Moscoso, Robt. Williams, and Gahan Wilson. After Times publisher Otis Chandler shut down the magazine in 1972, Salisbury moved on to become art director of Rolling Stone magazine.

Later, in the 1980s and 1990s, the San Jose Mercury News published their own version of West Magazine (full name San Jose Mercury News West Magazine).

=== Los Angeles Times Magazine ===
Los Angeles Times Magazine was started in 1985. As with West, the magazine was a weekly supplemental to the Sunday edition of the Los Angeles Times newspaper.

In 2006, the Los Angeles Times announced it was resurrecting West magazine, edited by Rick Wartzman, with writer Amy Tan as the literary editor. West replaced the Los Angeles Times Magazine.

A little more than a year later, in October 2007, West magazine changed its name and format again, returning to the Los Angeles Times Magazine and becoming a monthly. Because of financial losses, the editorial board of the magazine was restructured in 2008.

In 2012, the magazine won a national prize when the Robert F. Kennedy Center for Justice and Human Rights announced that Times photographer Michael Robinson Chavez won the international photography category for his work "Broken Promise: Gold Mining in Peru's High Andes," published in 2011.

The magazine printed its final issue on June 3, 2012.

=== Successor: The California Sunday Magazine ===
Since 2014, The California Sunday Magazine has been included in the Sunday edition.
