= George Whitmore =

George Whitmore may refer to:

- George Whitmore (British Army officer) (1775–1862), British Army general
- George W. Whitmore (1824–1876), American politician
- George Whitmore (climber) (1931–2021), American mountain climber and conservationist
- George Whitmore (writer) (1945–1989), American writer
- George Whitmore Jr., accused and cleared in the Career Girls Murders (1963)
- George Whitmore (haberdasher) (died 1654), English merchant, Lord Mayor of London in 1631
- George Stoddart Whitmore (1829–1903), New Zealand soldier, military leader, runholder and politician
