= Rick Loomis (photojournalist) =

American photographer

- Born: March 22, 1969 (age 57)
- Education: Western Kentucky University
- Occupation: photojournalist
- Awards: Pulitzer Prize for Explanatory Reporting, Robert F. Kennedy Award for Excellence in Journalism

Rick Loomis (born March 22, 1969) is an American photojournalist, documentary filmmaker and producer based in Los Angeles, California. Loomis won the Pulitzer Prize for Explanatory Reporting in 2007.

== Career ==
Loomis started his first newspaper job as a part-time photography lab technician at the Palm Beach Post in Florida where he was raised. Loomis earned a Bachelor of Arts in Photojournalism with a minor in Latin American Studies from Western Kentucky University. He joined the staff of the Los Angeles Times in 1994.

Loomis spent a month covering the aftermath of the September 11 attacks before joining the United States Marine Corps as they invaded Afghanistan. He covered the war in Afghanistan extensively for the following decade, spending more than two years in the country since 2001. During that time he also worked as an embedded journalist with the United States Army and Special Forces.

In 2003, Loomis again embedded with the United States Marine Corps to document the invasion of Iraq. In 2004, he covered the First Battle of Fallujah, also known as Operation Vigilant Resolve and has made several subsequent trips to report on the ongoing situation in Fallujah.

Loomis has been the recipient of the Robert F. Kennedy Award for Excellence in Journalism, The Hillman Prize from the Sidney Hillman Foundation, the National Journalism Award from the Scripps Howard Foundation, and Photographer of the Year from the National Press Photographers Association. He has been twice recognized by the Society of Professional Journalists through the Sigma Delta Chi Award, the Sidney Hillman Foundation, and through the John B. Oakes Award for Outstanding Environmental Journalism.

He has been a photography instructor at the Eddie Adams Workshop and the Mountain Workshops in Kentucky.
