= George Pawlaczyk =

George Pawlaczyk (born 1945) is an investigative journalist for the Belleville News-Democrat in Belleville, IL.

In 1968, he served in the United States Army as a reporter and photographer for the 1st Infantry Division newspaper in Vietnam. See coverage about him in reference in Time magazine in this entry.

== Awards ==
- 2007 co-winner of Robert F. Kennedy Award
- 2009 co-winner George Polk Award
- 2010 co-winner John Jay Excellence in Criminal Justice Reporting Awards
- 2012 co-winner IRE Award for Investigative Reporting

== Book ==
- Murder on a Lonely Road, with Beth Hundsdorfer, Berkeley (2012) ISBN 0-425-25034-2
