= Thom Dickerson =

American journalist (1949–2014)

- Born: Thomas Dickerson; March 1, 1949; Houston, Texas
- Died: October 4, 2014 (aged 65)
- Other name: Tailgate Jones
- Occupations: Journalist, news reporter
- Employer: KTRK-TV

Thomas "Thom" Dickerson (March 1, 1949 – October 4, 2014) was an American journalist, former reporter for KTRK Channel 13 who reported for over 25 years.

== Early career ==
Dickerson initially occupied a job in radio at the KCOH and KPRC-TV in Houston. Dickerson's television career began in 1973, when he worked as a news reporter at Channel 9 in Oklahoma City, OK. In 1975, he then returned to his home city of Houston to begin working at KTRK Channel 13, as a general assignments’ news reporter.

Dickerson was the recipient of a "special citation" at the Robert F. Kennedy Journalism awards in 1977 for a documentary he had produced at KTRK in 1976, “Requiem for a Dying Neighborhood”, describing the decay in an area located in downtown Houston.

== Career as a reporter ==
Dickerson reported on a number of events which took place during the 70's to the late 80's, including a Woodway Apartment Fire in 1979 and at Bellaire Hospital after an incident on a freeway in Houston. He later worked for the Houston Independent School District in the Media Department as a producer, editor, and reporter. He was an avid sportsman and especially enjoyed fishing.
