= Amy Walters =

American radio journalist

Amy Walters is an American journalist for Al Jazeera's podcast The Take.

== Background ==
She began her career as an assistant at NPR's Middle East Bureau after graduating from Earlham College. In 2000, she joined the staff of Morning Edition in Washington, D.C., then moved across the building to NPR's All Things Considered, where she contributed to NPR's award-winning coverage of September 11th.

In 2003, she helped to open NPR West and increase NPR's presence on the West Coast, from her new base she traveled around the country and the world. She covered the U.S. led wars in Iraq and Afghanistan, the aftermath of Hurricane Katrina in 2005, the 2010 BP oil spill, the 2011 earthquake in Haiti, the 2011 Arab Spring in Libya and Egypt. Back in California the big news events were Arnold Schwarzenegger's election as governor in 2003, California's troubled prison system; and the death of pop legend Michael Jackson in 2009.

Walters has won numerous audio journalism awards, the Peabody Awards, a DuPont-Columbia Award, Edward R Murrow Awards, and the Robert F. Kennedy Journalism Award for investigative journalism. Many of those awards were won at NPR, working with the Investigative Unit's Laura Sullivan. NPR's Ombudsman Edward Schumacher-Matos concluded their 2011 investigation into the South Dakota foster care system for Native American children series was "deeply flawed" and "should not have been aired as it was". NPR, however, stood by the series and called the ombudsman's report "unorthodox, the sourcing selective, fact-gathering uneven and the conclusions, subjective or without foundation." Two subsequent reports, one by a coalition of nine Lakota tribes, and another by the National Coalition for Child Protection Reform, reviewed the ombudsman's report and found the NPR series was sound. In May 2015, a federal judge ruled in summary judgment in favor of South Dakota's tribes finding that the State of South Dakota and its Department of Social Services had "failed to protect Indian parents' fundamental rights."

Walters continued her career at the Reveal for the Center for Investigative Reporting with hour long audio documentaries. She helped uncover problems with US foreign aid and President Trump's Washington DC hotel, possible emoluments clause violations, and ongoing Department of Justice investigation into kleptocracy involving the Malaysian fund 1MDB. She also received two 2018 Edward R Murrow Awards for her work on the #CitizenSleuth project with Center for Public Integrity. The project invited Citizen Sleuths to uncover new information from the financial disclosure forms of Trump appointees. Most recently she was 2019 Peabody award finalist for . She is now produces audio documentaries for Al Jazeera's podcast unit.
