= Daniel Zwerdling =

American journalist

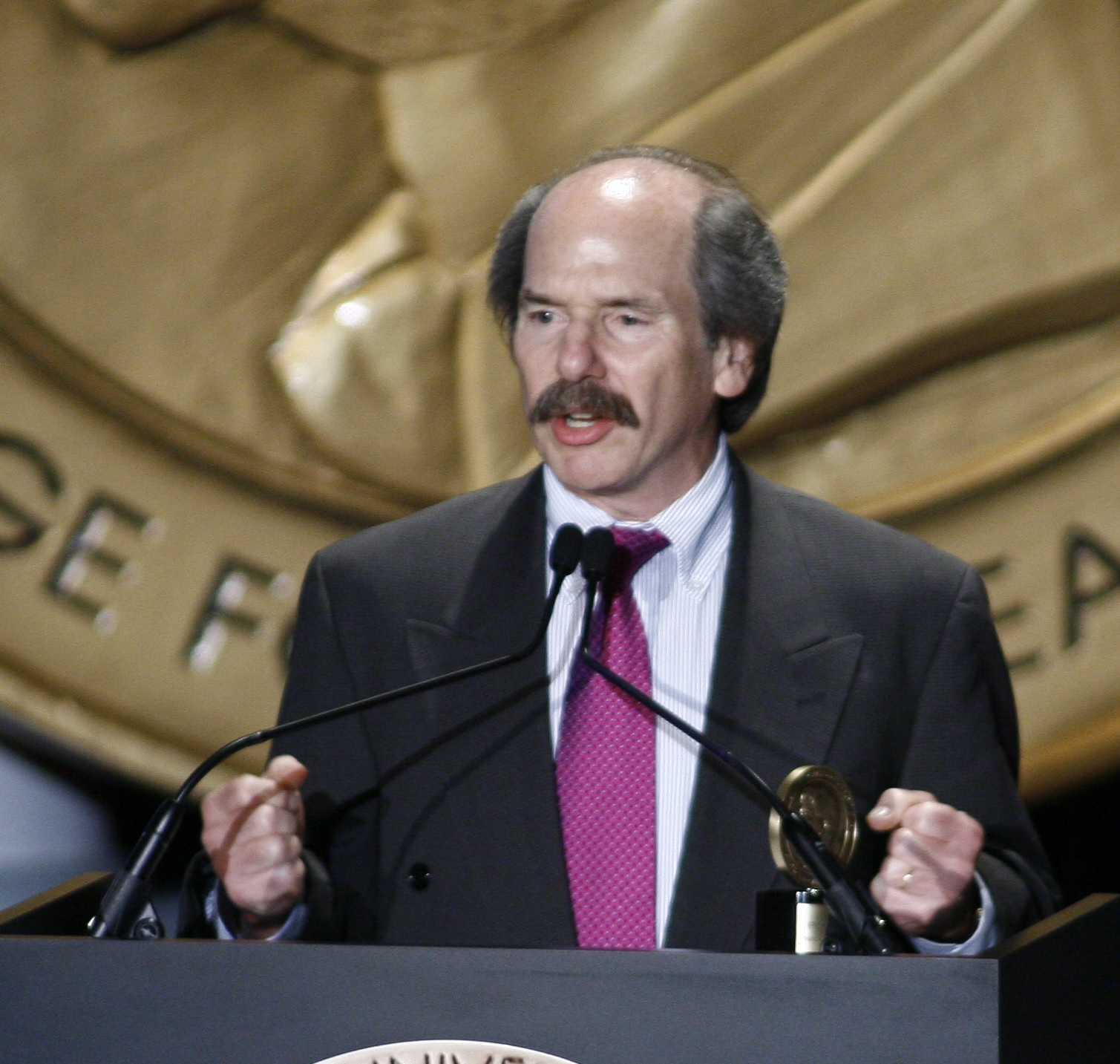
- Daniel Zwerdling accepting 66th Annual Peabody Award in 2007
- Occupation: Journalist

Academic background
- Education: University of Michigan

Academic work
- Institutions: American University; Bard College

Daniel Zwerdling is an American investigative journalist who has written for major magazines and newspapers. From 1980 to 2018, he served as an investigative reporter for NPR News, with stints as foreign correspondent and from 1993 to 1999, as host of Weekend All Things Considered. Zwerdling retired from NPR in 2018. He began co-hosting the podcast Two Reporters in 2021. His work has appeared in The New York Review of Books.

== Early life and education ==
Zwerdling attended Montgomery Blair High School in Silver Spring, Maryland, where he was editor of the student newspaper. He then attended the University of Michigan and received his degree in 1971.

== Career ==
He was a staff writer at The New Republic and a freelance reporter.

Zwerdling worked at National Public Radio in several positions since 1980, including as their senior investigative correspondent, their first roving Africa correspondent, and their first environmental reporter. From 1993 to 1999, he was senior host of NPR's Weekend All Things Considered. From 1999 to 2002, he was an investigative reporter for RadioWorks, NPR News. His layoff in 2002 provoked controversy among the NPR staff as the organization's decision to remove an investigative journalism line was seen as conflicting with the mission of NPR. From 2002 to 2004, he was NPR's television correspondent on Now on PBS with Bill Moyers. In 2018, Zwerdling retired from NPR amid several allegations of sexual harassment, although he has stated that the allegations are false.

His investigative reports have included examining the military's treatment of soldiers who have experienced trauma, the impact of fast food restaurants on animal rights, and the harmful substances in tobacco products. In 2006 and 2007, he reported that officers at Fort Carson were punishing soldiers who were returning from the war in Iraq and Afghanistan with post traumatic stress disorder and other serious mental health problems.

Since retiring from NPR, Zwerdling has completed investigative projects for The David Rockefeller Fund, The Marshall Project, among others.

He was an adjunct professor of media ethics at American University and an associate of Bard College's Institute for Language and Thinking in New York.

Since April 2021, Zwerdling and David Shipler have been featured on their podcast, Two Reporters - Shipler and Zwerdling during which they "interview stellar guests... examine problems and possible solutions... [and] just fascinating stuff" in novel ways.

== Awards ==
- 2017 Alfred I. duPont for “Missed Treatment” (with Colorado Public Radio)
- 2016 Robert F. Kennedy Journalism Award for “Injured Nurses”
- 2016 NIHCM Foundation award, “Injured Nurses”
- 2016 American Psychiatric Association Warren Williams Award, “Missed Treatment”
- 2010 George Polk Award for the radio report "Brain Wars" (shared with ProPublica investigative reporter T. Christian Miller and NRP journalist Susanne Reber)
- 2008 Alfred I. duPont–Columbia University Award
- 2007 Robert F. Kennedy Journalism Award
- Edward R. Murrow Award
- Investigative Reporters and Editors award in 2004 for "Abuse of Immigrant Detainees"
- Overseas Press Club Foundation award for live coverage of breaking international news
- American Association for the Advancement of Science Journalism Award
- National Press Club Award for consumer reporting
- Ohio State awards for international reporting
- James Beard Foundation Award for a June 2002 report on the fast food industry, "McDonalds New Farm: Fast Food and Animal Rights" (radio long form category) and previously for a 1999 story in radio short category
- George Foster Peabody Award presented in 1995 for an NPR team report about the tobacco industry's use of dangerous chemical substances
- Champion-Tuck Award for economic reporting
- World Hunger Media Awards

== Works ==
- Workplace Democracy (Harper & Row, 1980)
