= Sherry Jones (filmmaker) =

American documentary filmmaker

Sherry Lynn Jones
- Born: April 21, 1948; Austin, Texas, US
- Died: February 14, 2022 (aged 73); Washington, DC, US
- Education: University of Oklahoma (BA) Northwestern University (MA)
- Occupation: Documentary filmmaker
- Spouse: Alan Stone

Sherry Lynn Jones (April 21, 1948 – February 14, 2022) was an American documentary filmmaker known for investigative documentaries about national security issues and politics. She wrote, directed, and produced many documentaries for the Public Broadcasting Service (PBS) program Frontline, winning awards for several episodes including High Crimes and Misdemeanors (1990) about the Iran-Contra Affair and Watergate Plus 30: Shadow of History (2003).

== Early life and education ==
Jones was born on April 21, 1948, in Austin, Texas. She graduated in 1970 from the University of Oklahoma and earned a master's degree in journalism from Northwestern University in 1971.

== Career ==
After graduation, Jones worked on political campaigns before starting her documentary filmmaking as a field producer for filmmaker Charles Guggenheim. By 1980, she launched her own production company called Washington Media Associates.

As head of Washington Media Associates, she produced and directed documentary films for CNN, ABC, and PBS, collaborating with journalists such as Bill Moyers, Peter Jennings, and Hedrick Smith. From 1983 until 2009, she produced over 20 films for Frontline.

Between 1987 and 1991, Jones spent time in Moscow working on documentaries and learning Russian. Her film on the dissident Andrei Sakharov, In the Shadow of Sakharov (1991), used footage obtained from the Soviet Ministry of Atomic Power.

Some of her best-known documentaries shined a light on scandals in Washington. Her films explored a range of subjects such as an in-depth analysis of the Iran-Contra Affair (High Crimes and Misdemeanors, 1990), campaign finance violations in the 1996 elections (Washington's Other Scandal, 1998), and an examination of the Nixon Administration through interviews with former White House aide Jeb Stuart Magruder (Watergate Plus 30: Shadow of History, 2003).

The 2008 documentary, Torturing Democracy, produced in association with the National Security Archive where Jones was a senior fellow, detailed the use of torture by the Bush Administration during the War on Terror, and was one of the last films she produced before retiring from filmmaking.

== Death ==
On February 14, 2022, Jones died in a hospital in Washington, DC.

== Selected awards and honors ==
- 1990: duPont-Columbia Award for PBS, Frontline: "High Crimes and Misdemeanors" (reported by Bill Moyers)
- 1996: Recipient of the "Women of Vision" award presented by Women in Film & Video, DC
- 1998: George Foster Peabody Award for WGBH, Frontline: "Washington's Other Scandal"
- 2000: Inducted into the Medill "Hall of Achievement" at Northwestern University
- 2000: Edward R. Murrow Award (Overseas Press Club) for WGBH, Frontline: "Return of the Czar"
- 2003: Emmy Award, News & Documentary for "Trade Secrets: A Moyers Report"
- 2004: Emmy Award, News & Documentary for "Watergate Plus 30: Shadow of History"
- 2009: Robert F. Kennedy Journalism Award, Domestic TV, "Torturing Democracy"
