= R. Keith McCormick =

American modern pentathlete

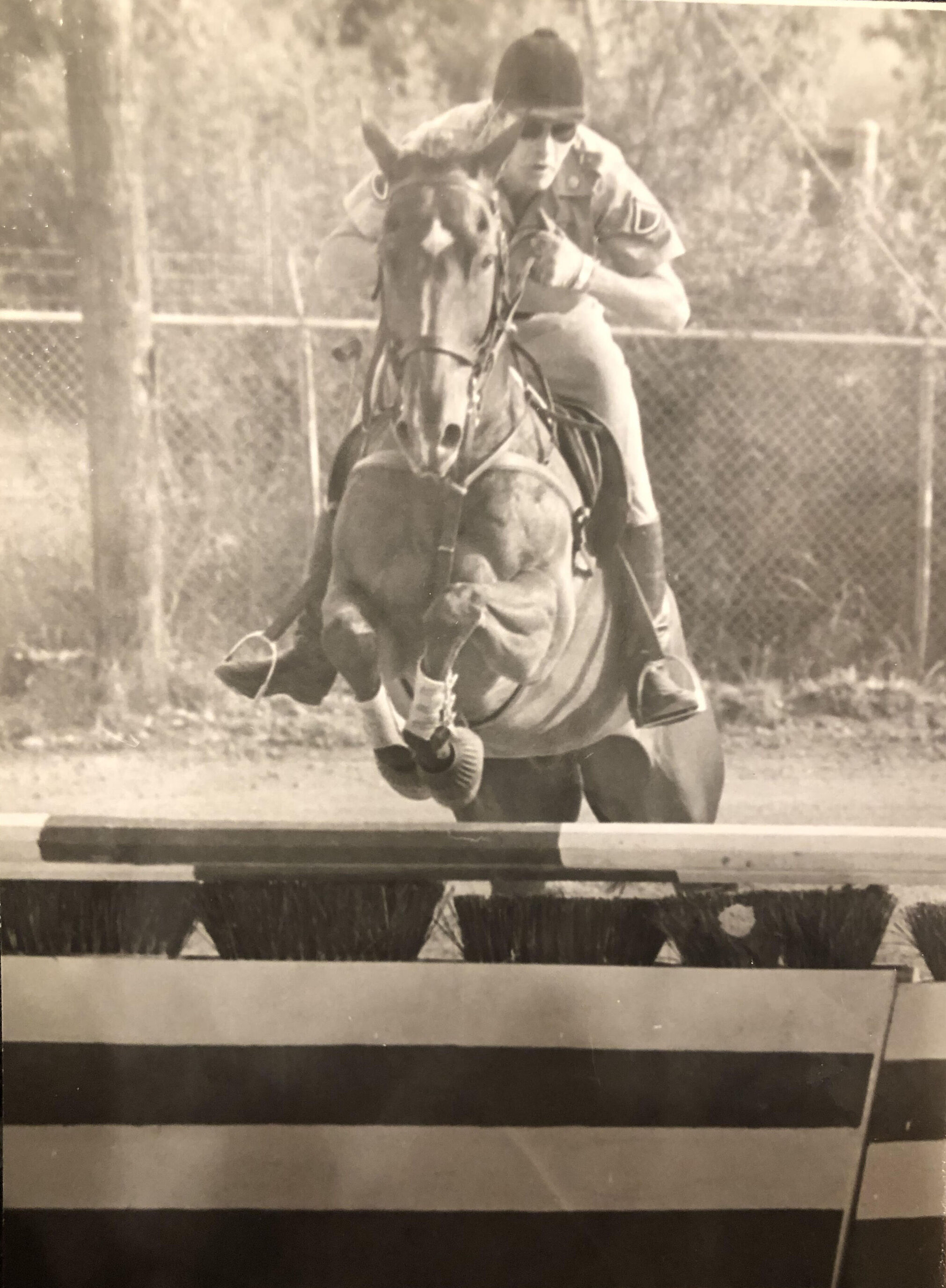
- McCormick in 1976
- Born: June 17, 1954 (age 72); Waynesboro, Pennsylvania, U.S.
- Education: Stanford University, National University of Health Sciences
- Occupation: Pentathlete
- Website: www.mccormickdc.com

R. Keith McCormick (born June 17, 1954) is an American modern pentathlete and U.S. Army veteran who represented the United States at the 1976 Summer Olympics, as an alternate. He finished second in the Junior World Championships in 1973, won the North American Pentathlon Championships in 1975, and briefly held the American record for points scored in the Modern Pentathlon. He was considered a contender to win the gold medal in 1980, when the United States boycotted the Olympics because of Russia's invasion of Afghanistan.

== Early life and education ==
McCormick was born in Waynesboro, Pennsylvania and later earned his bachelor's degree in Human Biology at Stanford University and his doctorate at the National College of Chiropractic. While at Stanford, McCormick competed on the cross-country and fencing teams and also competed in the World Modern Pentathlon Championships during his junior year.

== Professional career ==
Since 1982, Dr. R. Keith McCormick has been a Doctor of Chiropractic in the states of Massachusetts, Colorado, and California. Dr. McCormick is also a Sports Chiropractic Physician who treats collegiate, high school and recreational athletes in Western Massachusetts. He is a certified chiropractic sports physician and author of the 2009 book The Whole-Body Approach to Osteoporosis.

McCormick suffered 12 osteoporosis-related fractures over the span of 5 years. As a response to his personal history with severe osteoporosis, McCormick founded OsteoNaturals, LLC to develop supplements.

McCormick wrote a second book in 2023, Great Bones, Taking Control of Your Osteoporosis. In this book, he explains the fundamentals of osteoporosis, as well as the pathophysiology of bone loss. This book targets a wide audience, from patients suffering with osteoporosis to the physicians and specialists treating it, and explains what it takes to regain skeletal health.

== Publications ==
=== Books ===
- The Whole-Body Approach to Osteoporosis (New Harbinger Publications, 2009)
- Great Bones, Taking Control of Your Osteoporosis (OS Medical Publications, 2023)

=== Journals ===
- Osteoporosis: Integrating Biomarkers and Other Diagnostic Correlates into the Management of Bone Fragility (Alternative Medicine Review Volume 12, Number 2 2007)

== Private life ==
McCormick continues to compete in triathlons in all distances including Ironman Triathlons. McCormick placed 7th in his age group in the 2010 and 9th in his age group in 2011 70.3 Ironman Triathlon World Championships. His son is the journalist and author Ty McCormick.

== Modern pentathlon accomplishments ==
Year	Venue	Place
1973	Junior National Championships	1st place
1973	Junior World Championships	2nd place
1975	Polish World Invitational, Warsaw	1st place
1975	World Championships	2nd place team
1976	North American Invitational	1st place
1976	U.S. Olympic Team	5th place team
1976	U.S. National Record	5,425 points
1978	World Championships	4th place team
