= Ty McCormick =

American author, foreign correspondent, and magazine editor

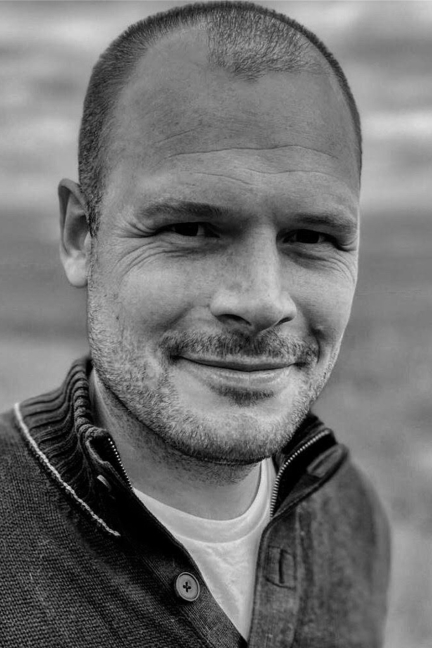
- Education: Stanford University; Somerville College, Oxford; Queen's University Belfast
- Occupation: Journalist
- Employer: Foreign Affairs
- Awards: Robert F. Kennedy Journalism Award Elizabeth Neuffer Memorial Prize

Ty McCormick is an American author, foreign correspondent, and magazine editor. He is currently a senior editor of Foreign Affairs, the magazine published by the Council on Foreign Relations. From 2015 to 2018, he was the Africa editor at Foreign Policy magazine. His writing has also appeared in the New York Times, Washington Post, and Los Angeles Times.

== Career ==
McCormick earned a bachelor's degree from Stanford University and a master's degree from the University of Oxford, where he was a Clarendon Scholar at Somerville College. He received a second master's degree from the Queen's University Belfast as a George J. Mitchell Scholar.

McCormick has been a foreign correspondent in Cairo, where he covered the 2011 Egyptian Revolution and its aftermath. He joined the editorial staff of Foreign Policy in 2012 and was appointed Africa editor in 2015. He has reported from more than a dozen countries in Africa and the Middle East.

His October 2017 cover story in Foreign Policy, "Highway Through Hell," about human smugglers in the Sahara Desert, was part of a five-part series that won a 2018 Robert F. Kennedy Journalism Award. He received the 2016 Elizabeth Neuffer Memorial Bronze Prize for his reporting on war crimes in the Central African Republic, "some witnessed and photographed courageously by the reporter," according to the citation from the U.N. Correspondents Association. He was a finalist for the 2015 Kurt Schork Award for his reporting on the civil war in South Sudan.

== Beyond the Sand and Sea ==
His book about a family of Somali refugees, Beyond the Sand and Sea: One Family's Quest for a Country to Call Home, was published by St. Martin's Press in 2021. Kirkus Reviews gave it a starred review, calling it "a riveting narrative of the plight of refugees." The Los Angeles Review of Books called it "well-researched and beautifully depicted, blending objective facts with emotional moments that are both heartbreaking and inspiring," adding that "McCormick’s unique style...combines linguistic austerity with imaginative descriptions.” The book also received favorable reviews in Foreign Affairs and The Irish Times.

== Personal ==
He is married to attorney and feminist author Jill Filipovic. His father is the former Olympic Modern Pentathlete R. Keith McCormick.
