= Torturing Democracy =

2008 film

- Directed by: Sherry Jones
- Produced by: Sherry Jones and Carey Murphy
- Narrated by: Peter Coyote
- Cinematography: Brett Wiley, Foster Wiley, Gary Grieg
- Edited by: Penny Trams, Foster Wiley
- Music by: Lenny Williams
- Release date: 2008
- Country: United States
- Language: English

Torturing Democracy is a 2008 documentary film produced by Washington Media Associates. The film details the use of torture by the Bush administration in the "war on terror".

== Overview ==
Produced by journalist Sherry Jones and narrated by Peter Coyote, Torturing Democracy examines the origin of the Bush administration's use of torture as part of US interrogation and detention policy.

Weaving together interviews with primary source documents, the film describes the initial response to 9/11 and the drawing up of legal memoranda, collectively called the "Torture Memos", that approved and expanded detention and interrogation policies, including the use of what the Bush administration and the Central Intelligence Agency (CIA) referred to as "enhanced interrogation techniques".

Many of the enhanced techniques, including waterboarding, were derived from a military training program called Survival, Evasion, Resistance, and Escape (SERE) and were modeled after tactics used to torture American soldiers during the Korean War. SERE training was designed to prepare American soldiers to resist torture if captured.

The documentary includes interviews with US State Department and military personnel, such as former Deputy Secretary of State Richard Armitage and former detainees held at Guantanamo Bay detention camp, including Shafiq Rasul.

Primary source documents, including the torture memos, interrogation logs, and reports, were released through Freedom of Information Act requests and lawsuits by the ACLU, Associated Press, and the Center for Constitutional Rights.

== Release ==
PBS did not initially air the film, although it was aired on PBS-affiliated networks. It was suggested that the airdate they proposed, January 21, 2009, one day after President Bush left office, was a factor in their decision but PBS claimed that the date was coincidental.

PBS's airdate offer was declined by the producer, Sherry Jones, as too late, not because of the election but because she felt that it needed to be released when “the news was still breaking”.

== Awards ==
- 2009 Robert F. Kennedy Journalism Award - Domestic TV

== See also ==
- Taxi to the Dark Side
- The Dark Side (book)
- Rasul v. Bush
