= Robyn Dixon =

Moscow bureau chief for The Washington Post

- Born: Melbourne (Australia)
- Alma mater: Presbyterian Ladies' College
- Occupation: Foreign correspondent
- Employer: The Washington Post (2019–)
- Awards: Sigma Delta Chi Award (for international reporting, 2007); Robert F. Kennedy Journalism Award (international reporting on human rights, social justice or the power of individual action, 2008); Batten Medal (American Society of News Editors, compassion, courage, humanity and a deep concern for the underdog, 2009); Daniel Pearl Award (for courage and integrity in reporting, 2009)

Robyn Dixon is a journalist and Moscow bureau chief for The Washington Post.

== Early life and career ==
Dixon was born and raised in Melbourne, Australia. She graduated from Presbyterian Ladies' College, Melbourne. Her mother is a housewife and her father is a judge in the County Court of Victoria. Since 1978, Dixon has worked as an editor for The Herald newspaper in Australia. From 1993, she worked as a Moscow correspondent for The Sydney Morning Herald and The Age for four years.

Since 1999, she worked as a foreign correspondent for the Los Angeles Times. In 2003, she moved with her daughter Sylvia to Johannesburg, South Africa, where she became bureau chief for the Los Angeles Times; and in 2018 she became bureau chief in Beijing, China.

Since November 2019, she has been the Moscow bureau chief for The Washington Post.

Dixon speaks English, Russian and French.

== Awards ==
- 2007 Sigma Delta Chi Award for international reporting;
- 2008 Robert F. Kennedy Journalism Award for "outstanding reporting of the lives and strife of disadvantaged people throughout the world";
- 2008 Citation by the Overseas Press Club in relation to the Joe and Laurie Dine award for international reporting dealing with human rights;
- 2009 Batten Medal by the American Society of News Editors;
- 2009 Daniel Pearl Award for courage and integrity in reporting;
- 2016 Madeline Dane Ross Award by the Overseas Press Club for the "best international reporting in print or digital showing a concern for the human condition".
