= Loretta Schwartz-Nobel =

American journalist and writer

Loretta Schwartz-Nobel is an American journalist and writer currently living in Pennsylvania. She is known primarily for her advocacy of disadvantaged families in America.

== Biography ==
Schwartz-Nobel received national acclaim for her article Nothing to Eat, which was published in the Christmas 1974 issue of the Philadelphia magazine. Nothing to Eat brought attention to the hardships of the poor and destitute living in the city of Philadelphia, and later went on to win the 1975 Robert F. Kennedy Journalism Award for outstanding coverage of the problems of the underprivileged.

For the next seven years, Schwartz-Nobel traveled around the United States, conducting similar research in cities like Boston, Washington, and Chicago, and writing articles for local newspapers and magazines in each city. In 1981, she wrote her first novel, Starving in the Shadow of Plenty, which highlighted the living conditions of poor families in America. The novel focused on the difficulty of obtaining food and the ineffectuality of government welfare programs.

Schwartz-Nobel's work as a journalist started to bear fruit after at least fifteen federal agencies acknowledged the existence of a domestic hunger epidemic. However, the surge in public awareness in the early 1980s never directly led to any significant political action to alleviate hunger or poverty in the United States.

In 1996, following the passage of Contract with America and Welfare to Work which impacted funds for America's hungry families, Schwartz-Nobel returned to her work in ending hunger within America. In 2002, her efforts resulted in Growing Up Empty, another novel critical of federal government welfare policies. Elements of the book include her criticism of poverty among families in the U.S. military and the federal government solving international, rather than national, hunger problems. Schwartz-Nobel has not commented on her satisfaction with the effects of the novel, but there have been no significant straightforward increases in welfare spending in the United States since the book's publication.

Following Growing Up Empty, Schwartz-Nobel published Poisoned Nation in 2007. Poisoned Nation discusses chemical contamination of water, air and food, and links this with cluster illnesses. The book is critical of the American government, arguing their involvement in deceptive and suppressive measures in relation to diseases, pollution and scientific data.

== Works ==
- Starving in the Shadow of Plenty, 1981
- Engaged to Murder, 1988
- A Mother's Story, 1989
- The Baby Swap Conspiracy, 1992
- Forsaking All Others, 1993
- The Journey, 2001
- Growing Up Empty, 2002
- Poisoned Nation, 2007

== Awards ==
- Women in Communication Award
- Society of Professional Journalists Award
- Penny Missouri Award
- Columbia Graduate School of Journalism Award
- Robert F. Kennedy Journalism Award (twice)

== Sources ==
- "Books of The Times", By Christopher Lehmann-Haupt, review of Engaged to Murder: The Inside Story of the Main Line Murders, New York Times, February 27, 1987.
- "Teacher had a Secret", by Lucinda Franks, review of Engaged to Murder: The Inside Story of the Main Line Murders, New York Times, Published: March 1, 1987
- "Books of The Times; Turning Motherhood Into a Political Statement", by Caryn James, review of A Mother's Story The Truth About the Baby M Case, New York Times, March 4, 1989
- "Where was Solomon?", by Josh Greenfeld, review of A Mother's Story The Truth About the Baby M Case, New York Times, March 12, 1989.
- "One-sided Account Of Baby Swap", by Peter Mitchell, review of The Baby Swap Conspiracy, Orlando Sentinel, May 16, 1993.
- "Books: Pennsylvania Death Trip", by R.Z. Sheppard, review of Engaged to Murder: The Inside Story of the Main Line Murders, Time (magazine), Monday, Feb. 23, 1987
- Short bio at MacMillan publisher
- Short bio at Harper Collins publisher
