= Lynn Neary =

American radio journalist

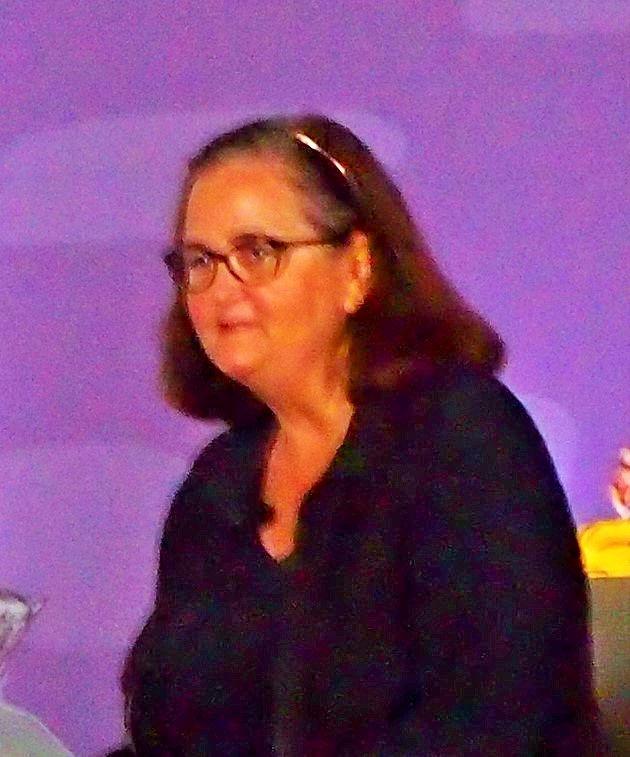
- Born: New York City
- Education: Fordham University
- Occupation: journalist
- Notable credit(s): Morning Edition, Weekend Edition and Talk of the Nation

Lynn Neary is a former American radio journalist. She was a correspondent on National Public Radio and on National Desk's Arts and Information Unit, covering books and publishing.

== Early years and education ==
Neary was born and raised in Crestwood, Westchester County, NY. She earned a B.A. in English from Fordham University.

== Career ==
Neary began her career in public radio as a news anchor and reporter, covering education and county government at NPR member station WOSU in Columbus, Ohio. She later moved to WRMT in Rocky Mount, North Carolina.

In 1982, she became a newscaster on Morning Edition, before taking over as weekend host of All Things Considered in 1984, a post she held until 1992. Neary was a regular guest host on NPR newsmagazines and its weekday talk show, Talk of the Nation.

Neary joined NPR's Cultural Desk in 1993. She developed NPR's first religious affairs newsbeat.

After 37 years at NPR, Neary retired in December 2019.

== Awards ==
Along with producer Dan Morris, Neary received a 1988 Robert F. Kennedy Journalism Award for 625 K Street, a report on the Arthur Kapper Housing Project, dubbed "the worst public housing in the District of Columbia". The piece centred on drug-related murders.

Neary reported for an American Public Radio documentary, A Primer on Breast Cancer, which won a 1992 Corporation for Public Broadcasting Gold Award, an Ohio State Award, and an International Association of Women in Radio and Television Award.

For her reporting on welfare reform, Neary shared NPR's 1994-95 Alfred I. duPont-Columbia University Silver Baton Award. She also won a 1999 Gabriel Award for her report on a program for prisoners in New York's Sing Sing prison.
