= Career Girls Murders =

1963 murders in New York City

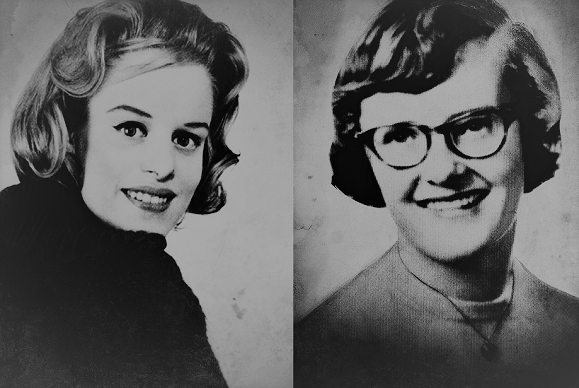
- Wylie (left) and Hoffert, c. 1963
- Date: August 28, 1963
- Location: New York City, New York, U.S.
- Deaths: 2: Emily Hoffert; Janice Wylie
- Suspects: George Whitmore Jr.
- Convicted: Richard "Ricky" Robles

The "Career Girls Murders" was the name given by the American media to the murders of Emily Hoffert and Janice Wylie, which occurred inside their apartment on the Upper East Side of Manhattan, New York City, on August 28, 1963. George Whitmore Jr. was charged with this and other crimes, but he was later cleared.

The actions of the New York City Police Department (NYPD) led Whitmore to be improperly accused of this and other crimes, including the murder of Minnie Edmonds and the attempted rape and assault of Elba Borrero. Whitmore was wrongfully incarcerated for 1,216 days—from his arrest on April 24, 1964, until his release on bond on July 13, 1966, and from the revocation of his bond on February 28, 1972, until his exoneration on April 10, 1973. Whitmore's treatment by the authorities was cited as an example that led the United States Supreme Court to issue the guidelines known as the Miranda rights, with the Court calling Whitmore's case "the most conspicuous example" of police coercion in the country. The Court issued its 1966 ruling, establishing a set of protections for suspects—including the right to remain silent—in Miranda v. Arizona.

== Crimes ==
On the evening of August 28, 1963, 23-year-old Patricia Tolles, who worked at the book division at Time-Life, returned from work to her apartment on the third floor of 57 East 88th Street in Manhattan, New York City. There, Tolles found the apartment ransacked and a bloody knife in the bathroom. Panicked, she ran to the lobby and called Max Wylie, the father of her roommate, who lived nearby. Wylie came to investigate, and in one of the bedrooms he found the bodies of his daughter, Janice, aged 21, and her roommate, Emily Hoffert, aged 23, next to a bloodied bed by the windows. The women were tied together with strips of cloth and had been stabbed repeatedly with three knives from their own kitchen. Janice had been stabbed in the chest and lower abdomen, the latter wounds causing partial evisceration, while Emily had been knifed in the neck. Emily's body was fully clothed, but Janice's was nude and showed evidence of sexual assault.

Janice Wylie was the daughter of advertising executive and novelist Max Wylie and niece of author Philip Wylie, while Emily Hoffert was the daughter of a Minneapolis surgeon. Because both victims belonged to prominent families, the case created a press sensation. The media dubbed it the "Career Girls Murders" because Janice worked as a Newsweek researcher and Emily was a schoolteacher. As such, they were representative of the thousands of young women who had come from all over the United States to larger cities like New York to seek jobs and careers. Other women like them now felt unsafe, and the New York City Police Department (NYPD) came under pressure to solve the murders. Hundreds of detectives were assigned to the investigation and thousands of people were interviewed, but weeks passed with no arrests made.

== Investigation ==
Initially, detectives believed that one or both of the victims knew their killer. They felt the level of violence they found is usually an indication of a personal relationship with the victim. Janice had been stabbed through the heart and slashed in the abdomen so severely that her intestines bulged out, while Emily's neck had multiple gaping stab wounds. There were no signs of forced entry and the apartment, which was on the third floor of a nine-story building, was also guarded by a doorman. Though the apartment was in disarray, nothing appeared to be stolen, so robbery was not believed to be a motive. The victims were bound by their hands and feet and were tied back-to-back, with Janice nude and Emily dressed. Two bloody 10- to 12-inch carving knives with their blades broken were found next to the bodies and an additional knife was found in one of the two bathrooms.

Police theorized that Janice had been the killer's intended victim because she was found naked and had facial cream smeared in her genital area. Since Emily was fully clothed, they believed she had arrived during the attack on Janice and was killed as a witness. They surmised that the women were attacked and murdered in the bedroom where their bodies were discovered. They did not immediately release information regarding Janice's sexual assault. They instead told the press that it did not appear that either had been raped but allowed that an autopsy might reveal otherwise. They did disclose that the women had been slashed repeatedly in the neck and abdomen. The focus on interviewing people named in Janice's green address book did not lead to identifying a suspect. Newsweek, Janice's employer, offered a $10,000 reward to aid in the apprehension of a culprit.

The public at large initially believed that the attacks were against women who had careers, as both of the victims fit that profile. Women—particularly white women—were left to feel vulnerable despite their desire to gain freedom and independence through their careers. One year after the murders, Janice's father penned a handbook, Career Girl, Watch Your Step!, warning career women about safety and the need to be aware and "feel threatened" as a defense. Many other handbooks, aimed at the safety of single women, were issued by local police and public safety departments. These handbooks mostly emphasized the importance of prevention of the attacks, including having male protection and needing physical security.

== Wrong suspect ==
In April 1964, Elba Borrero identified George Whitmore Jr., a 19-year-old day laborer, as the man who had attempted to rape her a few days prior; Borrero would later acknowledge that Whitmore was the only suspect police had shown her. When he was arrested, it was found that Whitmore was in possession of a photo of a white blonde woman. Brooklyn detectives Joe DiPrima and Edward Bulger jumped to the conclusion that the blonde in the photo was Janice, although her family later denied it. In reality the photo was that of Arlene Franco, a high school classmate of Whitmore, who had lost or discarded it in a park; Whitmore found it while scavenging in a landfill and for some reason decided to keep it in his wallet. Whitmore immediately became a suspect in the Career Girl Murders, and DiPrima and Bulger proceeded to interrogate him. Hours of leading questions eventually led Whitmore to confess.

The NYPD announced Whitmore's confession in the Career Girl Murders, as well as the unrelated killing of Minnie Edmonds and the attempted rape of Elba Borrero. The department claimed that Whitmore had given details of the Wylie-Hoffert killings which only the murderer could have known, but Manhattan prosecutors noticed that every detail in the Whitmore confession was known to the police beforehand. Police also stated that Whitmore had drawn a detailed diagram of the apartment and had in his wallet a photo of Janice that had been stolen from the flat.

Whitmore repudiated his confessions, claiming he had been beaten during the interrogations; that legal counsel had not been present; and that his request for a lie detector test had been denied. Witnesses were located claiming Whitmore had been in Wildwood, New Jersey, at the time of the Wylie-Hoffert murders, watching a live television broadcast of Martin Luther King Jr.'s "I Have a Dream" speech at the March on Washington, which occurred that same day. Despite Whitmore's discredited confession, New York County District Attorney Frank Hogan did not dismiss the indictment against him.

== New leads ==
On October 9, 1964, Nathan "Jimmy" Delaney, aged 35, a small-time drug dealer, was arrested for the murder of a rival drug dealer, Roberto Cruz del Valle. Facing the possibility of the death penalty, Delaney offered to make a deal: in return for leniency, he would give police the name of the real killer of Wylie and Hoffert, claiming it was not Whitmore. Delaney explained to police that on the day of the killings he had met an old acquaintance, Richard "Ricky" Robles, who had told him that he had committed the murders. Robles, a 22-year-old burglar, had been released from prison two months prior to the murders. To support his drug habit, Robles needed anywhere from $30 to $50 per day to secure his fix.

Delaney told detectives that Robles had turned up at his apartment on the day of the killings, demanding drugs while his hands and clothes were covered in blood. The shaken Robles told Delaney, “I just iced two dames.” Delaney gave him a clean change of clothes, then the two men went out to buy drugs with money Robles had given him. Delaney and his wife, Marjorie, were fitted with surveillance equipment, and other equipment was also installed in their and Robles' apartments. Over time, Robles talked about details of the murders that convinced investigators he was the real killer. Robles was arrested and charged on January 26, 1965.

== Second arrest and conviction ==
In the autumn of 1965, Robles was tried for the Career Girl Murders. His defense attempted to buoy the credibility of Whitmore's confession to create a reasonable doubt that their own client had committed the crime. However, prosecutor John F. Keenan replied by summoning Whitmore and the detectives who had arrested him. Robles' attorneys were unable to translate doubts about police interrogation methods to their own client's advantage, despite testimony that Robles had confessed to the murders while suffering from heroin withdrawal and without his attorney present. Delaney testified that Robles told him that he had intended to burglarize the apartment and entered it through an open third-floor window. Once inside, he surprised Janice, who had been sleeping nude in the hot August weather, as the press noted was her custom. He decided to rape her, and while he was doing so, Emily arrived. He grabbed her as well, but she told him not to remove her glasses so that she could identify him to police. Panicking, he beat both women over the head with soda pop bottles and bound their bodies together. Fearing going back to prison, he decided to eliminate them as witnesses. He went to the apartment’s kitchen and grabbed butcher knives with which he stabbed and slashed at their inert bodies, disemboweling Janice and nearly decapitating Emily. Two of the knife blades broke as a result of the savage attack.

Robles' attorney indicated that Delaney was given immunity in exchange for his testimony, but on December 1, 1965, Robles was found guilty of the murders of Janice Wylie and Emily Hoffert and sentenced to life in prison. Just months before, the New York Legislature had abolished the death penalty, except in the cases of the killing of police officers, prison guards and murders committed while escaping jail. Robles' conviction was secured largely on the basis of the tape-recorded conversations. Despite the conviction, numerous questions regarding the police conduct with regard to Whitmore were left unanswered.

Police detectives, who may have been motivated by their sense of justice, resorted to highly questionable means to extract a confession from a suspect who was too weak to resist. Their colossal blunders in the career girls murder case almost put George Whitmore Jr. on death row for a crime he certainly did not commit. No formal charges were ever brought against Detectives Bulger and DiPrima who consistently denied any wrongdoing in the case, but exactly how Whitmore was able to supply a 61-page confession to a double murder he never committed was never explained.

Robles, who had publicly protested his innocence over the murders, did not admit his guilt until a parole board hearing in November 1986. He admitted he had broken into the apartment to obtain money for drugs and had initially assumed it was empty. When he ran into the naked Janice, he attacked and raped her. Emily had turned up shortly afterward and he attacked her as well. Defiantly, she told him that she would remember his face and report him to the police, whereupon he became enraged and murdered both women. The three-member panel rejected granting parole, citing "the nature of the crime." No charges were pressed against the detectives who had obtained Whitmore's "confession."

== Legacy ==
Whitmore's treatment by the NYPD was one of many examples used by the United States Supreme Court when it issued the guidelines known as the Miranda rights in June 1966 by which, when a defendant is taken into custody and accused of a crime, he must be advised of his constitutional rights. The Court acknowledged that coercive interrogations could produce false confessions, and in a footnote stated: "[t]he most conspicuous example occurred in New York in 1964 when a Negro of limited intelligence confessed to two brutal murders and a rape which he had not committed." When this was discovered, a prosecutor was reported as saying: "Call it what you want — brainwashing, hypnosis, fright. The only thing I don't believe is that Whitmore was beaten." Janice's mother and sister, Isobel Wylie and Pamela Wylie Sullivan, respectively, both died within five years of the murders. Mrs. Wylie died from cancer, while Pamela from a bout of pneumonia. Despondent over the deaths of the three women in his life, Max Wylie committed suicide by gunshot in 1975 in a motel room in Fredericksburg, Virginia.

Whitmore made a life for himself in Wildwood, New Jersey. He successfully sued the City of New York for false arrest and was awarded $500,000 in damages. He operated a commercial fishing boat for a time, but he was later disabled in a boating accident. Whitmore squandered the award money, was unemployed for long stretches, and suffered from depression and alcoholism. He never married. The father of four daughters and two sons, George Whitmore Jr. died on October 8, 2012, in a nursing home of a heart attack. He was 68 years old.

Robles was released on parole in May 2020. Prior to this, he was New York State Inmate #66A0003, imprisoned in the Greene Correctional Facility and had been denied parole multiple times. While in jail, Robles taught fellow prisoners computer skills and received an associate degree.

== In popular culture ==
- The case served as the basis of the 1973 television movie The Marcus-Nelson Murders, which in turn served as a pilot for the crime drama series Kojak.
- The Killings, a 1973 novel by Edgar-winning author Clark Howard, also fictionalized the case, changing the setting from New York to Los Angeles.
- In a 2009 episode of Mad Men (season 3, episode 9, "Wee Small Hours"), two characters hear the beginning of a radio broadcast, in which the newscaster reports that the bodies of the victims, Wylie and Hoffert, had been found in their apartment.
- The case was revisited in 2013 in Investigation Discovery's series A Crime to Remember (Season 1, Episode 2, "The Career Girl Murders").
