= Michael Robinson Chávez =

- Born: 1969 (age 56–57); Ventura, California, USA
- Education: San Francisco State University
- Occupations: Photojournalist, educator
- Notable work: Mestizo, Photographs from Peru 1993-2021, published by Eyeshot Books, Italy
- Awards: Pulitzer Prize, RFK Journalism Award
- Website: chavezphoto.com

Michael Robinson Chávez is a half-Peruvian American photographer born in Ventura, California, in 1969. His photographic work often focuses on world affairs, societal changes brought on by conflict, immigration, and climate change. He is the author of "Mestizo," a monograph of his photographs from Peru.

He won the 2023 Px3 Photographie Paris Photographer of the Year award and two Pulitzer prizes, including one for Explanatory Journalism on climate change in 2020 and as part of a team Public Service Award in 2022 for coverage of the January 6, 2021 coup attempt at the U.S. Capitol. Pictures of the Year International named him Photographer of the Year in 2019.

He is also a three-time winner of the Robert F Kennedy Journalism Award for photojournalism. His photographs have been shown and exhibited worldwide, including at the Magazzino Arti Sceniche in Bologna, Italy, the Head On Photo Festival in Sydney, Australia, the Orange County Museum for Contemporary Art in California, Visa Pour l'image in Perpignan, France, and the Leica Camera Gallery in Washington DC, USA among others.

== Life and work ==
Michael Robinson Chávez grew up in the Conejo Valley, a bedroom community north of Los Angeles, and graduated with a BA in journalism from San Francisco State University in 1994.

Robinson Chávez was working as a forklift driver when he discovered his love of photography thanks to a friend who loaned him a Canon AE-1 camera and a bag of film prior to a trip to Peru in 1988.

He began seriously photographing Peru, his mother's homeland, in 1993 and continued to make many trips there over the next three decades. The work, entitled, "Mestizo" is being published as a monograph by Eyeshot Books in early 2026.

He worked for The Washington Post for 15 years and focused on conflicts in the Middle East, including the U.S. invasion of Iraq, the Israeli/Hezbollah war of 2006, and the Israeli/Palestinian conflict. In Iraq, Robinson Chávez worked closely with the late journalist Anthony Shadid covering the Shiite community in the wake of Iraqi dictator Saddam Hussein's fall. He also focused on climate change documenting rising temperatures in Siberia, the rising waters of the Bay of Bengal, and supply chains for lithium batteries in the Democratic Republic of Congo, China, and Argentina.

Before that, he worked for the Los Angeles Times, The Boston Globe, and was based in Mexico and Panama for the Associated Press. Robinson Chávez has covered significant events in over 75 countries, including the historical drought in California's Central Valley, the collapse of Venezuela, violence in Mexico, tsunamis in Indonesia and Chile, the Arab Spring in Egypt, and gold mining in Peru.

He currently lives in Valencia, Spain, with his wife and daughter, and works as a freelance photographer, writer, educator, and lecturer. While in Europe he has photographed immigration in Spain for The New York Times, the Russian full-scale invasion of Ukraine for National Public Radio, the death of Pope Francis for Getty Images, and the deadly 2024 floods in Valencia for the Dutch newspaper De Volkskrant.
