= Jill Filipovic =

American feminist, lawyer, and author (born 1983)

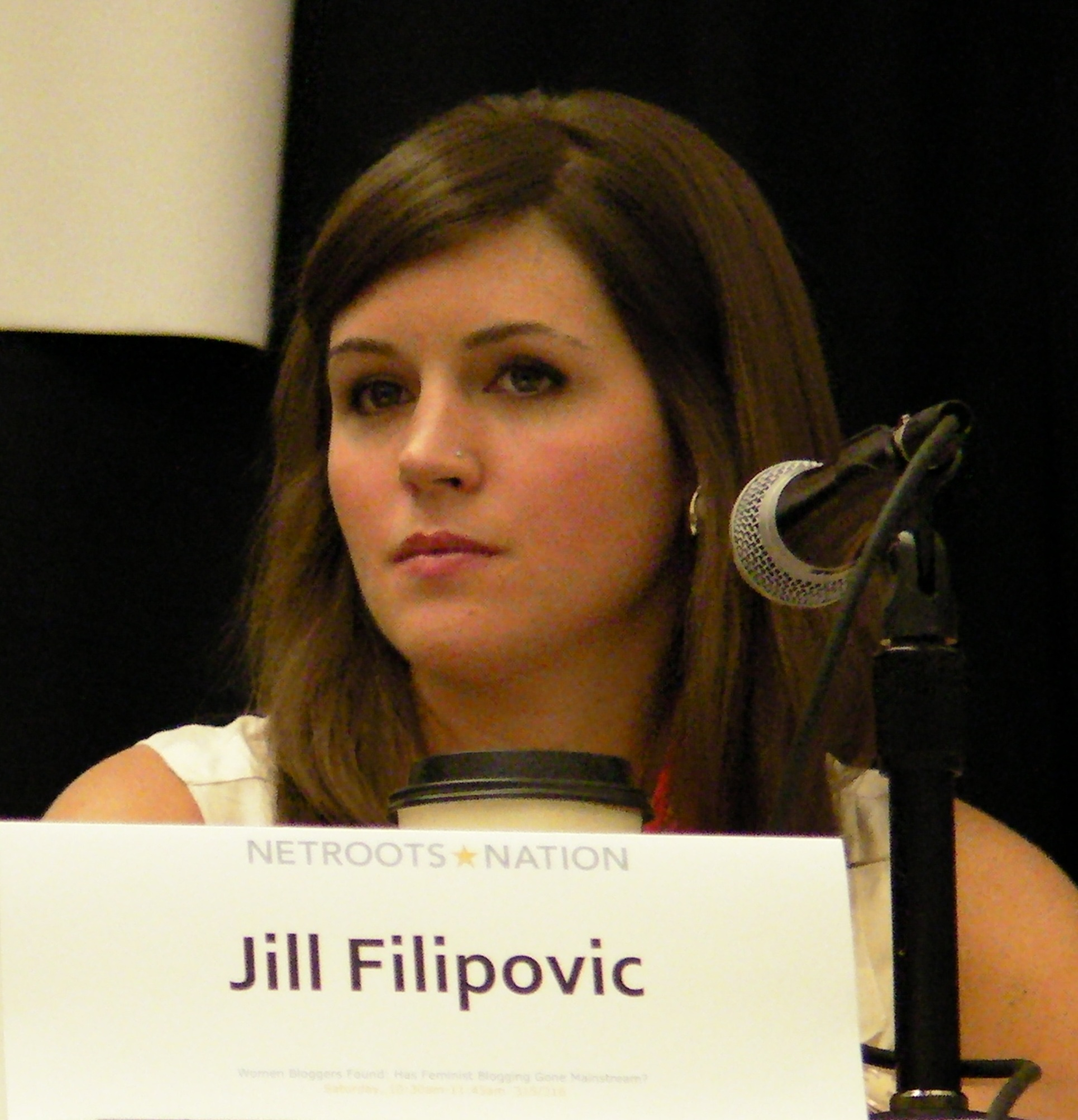
- Filipovic at Netroots Nation (Pittsburgh, 2009)
- Born: August 3, 1983 (age 43)
- Education: New York University (BA, JD)
- Occupations: Writer, attorney
- Known for: Blogging at Cosmopolitan, The Huffington Post, Feministe
- Spouse: Ty McCormick (m. 2018)
- Website: jillfilipovic.com

Jill Nicole Filipovic (born August 3, 1983) is an American author and attorney.

== Education ==
Originally from the Seattle area, Filipovic attended Shorewood High School. She earned a Bachelor of Arts in journalism and politics and a minor in gender and sexuality studies from New York University. She earned a Juris Doctor from the New York University School of Law in 2008.

== Career ==
Filipovic is a columnist for The Guardian. Since 2005, she has been a blogger at Feministe, one of the largest feminist blogs. In April 2014, Cosmopolitan hired her to write for its blog.

She has written opinions and reviews for The New York Times, The Washington Post, Time, and CNN. She has written two books: The H-Spot: The Feminist Pursuit of Happiness (2017) and OK Boomer, Let's Talk: How My Generation Got Left Behind (2020).

=== Men's rights groups ===
Filipovic has been an outspoken critic of the website A Voice for Men. Michelle Goldberg, writing in The Washington Post, said she had been "singled out by" men's rights groups for her criticism. She was featured in the 2014 book Hate Crimes in Cyberspace due to the harassment she faced for her feminist blog. According to Kerryn Goldsworthy, she has been googlebombed by her detractors.

=== TSA and civil liberties ===
A Transportation Security Administration (TSA) screener was fired after Filipovic blogged about an incident in which a handwritten comment was left in her luggage. She later wrote, "I would much prefer a look at why 'security' has been used to justify so many intrusions into our civil liberties."

=== Beauty pageants ===
Filipovic has written of beauty pageants that "the norms that these contests promote are unfortunately not...obsolete...We pay lip service to women's rights, but focus more on how good women look in a bathing suit."

=== Name changes ===
Filipovic has argued that women should not change their names when they marry. A 2013 column for The Guardian, "Why should married women change their names? Let men change theirs", was cited as recommended reading on the social construction of gender in Critical Encounters in Secondary English: Teaching Literacy Theory to Adolescents by Deborah Appleman (2014). Filipovic married Ty Lohrer McCormick in 2018, and kept her surname.

=== Domestic violence and asylum ===
Filipovic has criticized Jeff Sessions' directive to refuse grants of asylum to women fleeing domestic violence. She emphasized that women who suffer domestic violence in places where the government refuses to protect them are being persecuted. She stated: "Sessions, because of his deep antipathy toward immigrants and his misogynistic worldview that domestic violence is a private family matter, has undercut this promise of safe harbor – and taken a law meant for protection and turned it into a cudgel of sexist cruelty."

She has also written about how the prohibition of abortion in Honduras drives women who are victims of sexual violence to migrate from the country.

== Personal life ==
Filipovic is of Serbian and German descent through her father's side of the family. She married journalist Ty McCormick in 2018.

== Awards ==
- 2015 Society of Professional Journalists Sigma Delta Chi Award, best online column writing
- 2015 Planned Parenthood Federation of America Maggie Award for Media Excellence for best TV and online reporting
- 2014 Society of Professional Journalists Sigma Delta Chi Award, best online column writing
- 2014 Newswomen's Club of New York Front Page Award for opinion/ criticism

== Bibliography ==
- Filipovic, Jill (2008), "Offensive feminism: the conservative gender norms that perpetuate rape culture, and how feminists can fight back", in Jaclyn Friedman; Jessica Valenti (eds.), Yes Means Yes: Visions of Female Sexual Power and A World Without Rape, Seal Press, ISBN 9780786727056
- Filipovic, Jill (2017), The H-Spot: The Feminist Pursuit of Happiness, Nation Books, ISBN 978-1568585475
- Filipovic, Jill (2020), OK Boomer, Let's Talk: How My Generation Got Left Behind, Simon and Schuster, ISBN 978-1982153762

== See also ==
- New Yorkers in journalism
