= George Whitmore Jr. =

American falsely accused of murder (1944–2012)

George Whitmore Jr. (May 26, 1944 – October 8, 2012) was an African American man who was charged but later cleared of the infamous Career Girls Murders that occurred in New York City in 1963. "The Supreme Court cited Mr. Whitmore’s case as 'the most conspicuous example' of police coercion when it issued its 1966 ruling in Miranda v. Arizona, establishing a set of protections for suspects, like the right to remain silent."

In April the following year, Elba Borrero identified Whitmore as the man who attacked her. Upon his arrest, photos of a white blonde woman were found in his possession and were believed to be that of Janice Wylie. Brooklyn police announced that Whitmore had confessed to the Wylie-Hoffert and Edmonds murders and the attempted assault of Elba Borrero, who had identified him as her attacker. At a news conference it was announced that Whitmore had given details of the Wylie-Hoffert murders that only the killer could have known. It was stated he had drawn a detailed diagram of the apartment and had in his wallet a photo of Janice Wylie that had been stolen from the flat.

The actions of the police department led Whitmore to be improperly accused of this and other crimes, including the murder of Minnie Edmonds and the attempted rape and assault of Elba Borrero. Whitmore was wrongfully incarcerated for 1,216 days — from his arrest on April 24, 1964, until his release on bond on July 13, 1966, and from the revocation of his bond on February 28, 1972, until his exoneration on April 10, 1973. This was after what author T.J. English called, in his book The Savage City, "a numbing cycle of trials, convictions, convictions overturned, retrials, and appeals", Whitmore was cleared of all charges and released. Whitmore's treatment by the authorities was cited as an example that led the U.S. Supreme Court to issue the guidelines known as the Miranda rights, with the Supreme Court calling Mr. Whitmore's case "the most conspicuous example" of police coercion in the country when it issued its 1966 ruling establishing a set of protections for suspects, including the right to remain silent, in Miranda v. Arizona.

== Investigation and wrong suspect ==
In April the following year, Elba Borrero identified George Whitmore Jr., a nineteen-year-old day laborer, as the man who had attempted to rape her a few days prior. Borrero would later acknowledge that Whitmore was the only suspect police had shown her.

When Whitmore was arrested, it was found that he was in possession of a photo of a white blonde woman. Brooklyn detectives Joe DiPrima and Edward Bulger jumped to the conclusion that the blonde in the photo was Janice Wylie, although her family denied it. The photo was that of Arlene Franco, a high school classmate of Whitmore, living in New Jersey, who had lost or discarded it in a park, where Whitmore found it and for some reason decided to keep it in his wallet. Whitmore immediately became a suspect in the Wylie and Hoffert double murder. Detectives DiPrima and Bulger proceeded to question Whitmore about the Wylie-Hoffert murders and after hours of leading questions Whitmore finally confessed.

New York City police announced that Whitmore had confessed to the murders of Wylie and Hoffert, as well as the murder of Minnie Edmonds (an unrelated murder) and the attempted rape of Borrero. The NYPD announced Whitmore had given details of the Wylie-Hoffert killings which only the murderer could have known, but Manhattan prosecutors noticed that every detail in the Whitmore confession was known to the police beforehand. Police stated he had drawn a detailed diagram of the apartment and had in his wallet a photo of Janice Wylie that had been stolen from the flat.

Whitmore repudiated his confessions, claiming he had been beaten during the interrogations; that counsel had not been present; and that his request for a lie detector test had been denied. Witnesses were located claiming Whitmore had been in Wildwood, New Jersey, at the time of the Manhattan murders, watching a live TV broadcast speech of Martin Luther King Jr. at the March on Washington, 159 miles away from the crime scene. Despite Whitmore's discredited confession, New York County District Attorney Frank Hogan did not dismiss the indictment against him.

Whitmore had claimed to have found the photo of a young blonde, which the arresting officers claimed was of Janice Wylie, in a junkyard in Wildwood, New Jersey, where his father worked. Inquiries led investigators to identify the girl in the photo as Arlene Franco, who was very much alive and living in southern New Jersey. They also found witnesses who claimed that Whitmore was in Wildwood at the time of the murders: he had been watching a TV broadcast of Martin Luther King's speech during the March on Washington and was thus miles away from the crime scene.

It has since become known, however, that the prosecutor's office had in its possession, and deliberately withheld, an FBI report that found that the button was not a match for Whitmore's coat. Meanwhile, Whitmore maintained his claims that he had been beaten by the police and had only confessed when the pressure became too great. "I was in the precinct — the only Negro in that precinct house. Everytime I denied I'd done any of those things, they'd punch me in the back or chest. They beat on me whenever I said no."

== First trial ==
Whitmore was originally represented by Jerome Leftow, a court-appointed attorney from Kings County, who was discharged following Whitmore's first conviction in the Borrero trials. He was replaced by Arthur H. Miller and Edwin Kaplan, both of Brooklyn, and Stanley Reiben of Manhattan, who became Whitmore's primary defense team for the remainder of the Whitmore criminal matters. The defense lawyers worked for Whitmore largely on a pro bono basis. "Miller did most of the investigation work-digging up evidence — and Reiben blueprinted the courtroom strategy. With help from newspaper reporters, the lawyers soon had enough evidence to convince them that the Wylie-Hoffert case against Whitmore was worthless." Of the various attorneys who represented Whitmore, Miller remained with Whitmore the longest, through his ultimate release and later during his fruitless attempts at obtaining compensation for his wrongful incarceration.

Aside from Whitmore's coerced confession, no other evidence could be found linking him to the Manhattan murders, and Hogan delayed the prosecution of Whitmore for those offences. "Presumably a murder rap would have been given precedence; but since the Wylie-Hoffert 'confession' had collapsed and the [Borrero-]Edmonds prosecution hinged on the same document, [the District Attorney's Office] had chosen to play it safe."

== Further trials ==
In March 1965, New York Supreme Court Judge David Malbin quashed Whitmore's conviction for the attack on Borrero on the grounds that members of the jury were racially biased and had discussed the Wylie-Hoffert murders, which they were instructed not to.

Prosecutors insisted Whitmore should face retrial for the Borrero mugging and still be tried for the murder of Minnie Edmonds. The trial for the Edmonds murder began in April 1965. There was no physical evidence linking Whitmore to the crime and the prosecution had to rely mainly on his confession — now much-maligned given the fact that someone else now stood accused of the double murders to which Whitmore had also originally confessed. On the stand, Whitmore stood by his story that the confessions were obtained as a result of beatings and claimed that he did not even realize that he was being charged with murder until the indictments. Police detectives denied the allegations. When the jury was unable to reach a verdict, a mistrial was declared. Four days later, Hogan formally dismissed the Wylie-Hoffert indictment pending against Whitmore.

On December 1, 1965, Richard Robles was found guilty of the murders of Emily Hoffert and Janice Wylie and sentenced to life in prison, the New York Legislature having, just months before, abolished the death penalty, except in the cases of the killing of police officers, prison guards, and murders committed while escaping jail.

Despite the conviction of Robles, numerous questions regarding the police conduct in this case were left unanswered. "Police detectives, who may have been motivated by their sense of justice, resorted to highly questionable means to extract a confession from a suspect who was too weak to resist. Their colossal blunders in the career girls murder case almost put George Whitmore Jr. on death row for a crime he certainly did not commit. No formal charges were ever brought against Detectives Bulger and DiPrima who consistently denied any wrongdoing in the case. But exactly how Whitmore was able to supply a 61-page confession to a double murder he never committed was never explained."

In March 1966, Whitmore was tried for the second time for the attack on Elba Borrero, who maintained he was her aggressor. Defense counsel Stanley J. Reiben tried to cast doubt on his client's confession to the assault on the grounds it was obtained in the same manner as the repudiated Wylie-Hoffert confession. The presiding judge, New York Supreme Court Justice Aaron F. Goldstein, ruled the Wylie-Hoffert confession inadmissible and Whitmore was found guilty and sentenced to between five and ten years in prison.

Kings County Supreme Court Justice Hyman Barshay later dismissed the indictment against Whitmore in the Edmonds case. The Appellate Division of the New York Supreme Court also ruled the failure to admit the Wylie-Hoffert confession in the Borrero trial was a "prejudicial error" and Whitmore faced his third trial on the case. In June 1967 he was found guilty and again sentenced from five to ten years.

Whitmore's lawyers proceeded to appeal all the way to the U.S. Supreme Court, but each court of appeal upheld the guilty verdict. In December 1972, after Whitmore had exhausted his appeals, journalist Selwyn Raab, who had covered Whitmore's travails for the New York World Telegram and Sun, obtained dramatic new evidence — an affidavit from Borrero's sister-in-law, Celeste Viruet. The affidavit said, before Borrero identified Whitmore, police had shown Celeste an array of photos of other possible suspects — and she had identified positively another man as her assailant. By this time, Brooklyn had a new district attorney, Eugene Gold, who confirmed the accuracy of the affidavit. On April 10, 1973, a Supreme Court judge vacated Whitmore's conviction, officially exonerating him. Whitmore received no compensation for his wrongful imprisonment.

The third conviction was obtained in part as a result of police and district attorney's office's suppression of the existence of an eyewitness to the assault on Borrero. As noted by Circuit Judge Mulligan, in dissent, "Appellant urges here, as he did in the district court, that it was not until the Spring (March–May) 1969 post-trial evidentiary hearing that counsel for Whitmore ever learned that there was an eyewitness to the assault on Mrs. Borrero. It was then ascertained that Detective Aidala who was in charge of the Minnie Edmonds' murder investigation and took over the Borrero case because of a possible similarity of modus operandi, kept a notebook which indicated that Celeste Viruet, the sister-in-law of the victim, had seen her being grabbed in the early morning of April 23, 1964 while looking out of her apartment window. Counsel for Whitmore in all three Borrero trials have submitted affidavits denying that they ever knew of or were advised of the existence of Celeste Viruet, the silent witness in the window. Celeste Viruet was never called by the State in any of the trials nor has she ever appeared in any evidentiary or other proceeding relating to Whitmore. The State makes no contention that defense counsel was ever specifically advised of the existence of this witness." The description provided by the "hidden" witness of the alleged attacker materially differed from Whitmore's actual physical appearance. No punishment attached to the District Attorney's office for this suppression of evidence.

== Significance ==
The Whitmore case was also significant in the restriction and eventual elimination of the death penalty in New York State. Although the death penalty ultimately returned to New York State, no inmate was put to death under the restored law, and the law has since been overturned and rendered non-functional by the New York State Court of Appeals.

== Death ==
Whitmore died on October 8, 2012, in Wildwood, New Jersey, at the age of 68.
