= List of Kojak episodes =

This is a list of episodes for the television series Kojak.

The first five seasons (Pilot + 118 ep.) were aired on CBS from 1973 until 1978. CBS also commissioned a pair of TV movies in 1985 and 1987. ABC revived Kojak in 1989 for five additional TV movies, the last of which aired in 1990.

== Series overview ==
Season	Episodes	Originally released		
Season	Episodes	First released	Last released	Network
Pilot movie		March 8, 1973		CBS
1	22	October 24, 1973	May 8, 1974	CBS
2	25	September 15, 1974	March 9, 1975	CBS
3	24	September 14, 1975	March 7, 1976	CBS
4	25	September 26, 1976	March 22, 1977	CBS
5	22	October 2, 1977	March 18, 1978	CBS
TV movies		February 16, 1985	April 7, 1990	CBS (movies 1 & 2); ABC (movies 3–7)

== Episodes ==
=== Pilot movie (1973) ===
Title	Directed by	Written by	Original release date
The Marcus-Nelson Murders	Joseph Sargent	Abby Mann	March 8, 1973
Lt. Theo Kojak (Telly Savalas) believes that a black youth who confessed to the murder of two white girls was beaten and coerced by his police interrogators and is innocent of the crime. Based on the 1963 Wylie-Hoffert murders, the brutal rape and murder of two young professional women in Manhattan, this is the 139-minute pilot episode with Ned Beatty, Marjoe Gortner and Roger Robinson. It differs from later shows (set in 1963-1966, different colleagues, precinct building, and a car never used later). Music score composed by Billy Goldenberg.

=== Season 1 (1973–74) ===
No. overall	No. in season	Title	Directed by	Written by	Original release date
1	1	"Siege of Terror"	William Hale	Robert Heverly	October 24, 1973
Kojak has two hours to free hostages taken by robbers in an Army surplus store - Harvey Keitel and James Sloyan guest star. This episode featured the initial use of the first Kojak main title theme, composed by Billy Goldenberg (who did two music scores for the series).
2	2	"Web of Death"	William Hale	Jack Laird	October 31, 1973
A fellow detective, Nick Ferro, kills his wife's lover and tries to cover it up - Héctor Elizondo, Barbara Rhoades, John Karlen, and Bruce Kirby guest star. Features the second of the two music scores composed by Billy Goldenberg.
3	3	"One for the Morgue"	Richard Donner	Jerrold Freedman	November 7, 1973
Kojak is suspicious of anonymous tips suggesting that an underworld boss is attempting assassination of his rival which would lead to a mafia war. Art Metrano guest stars. The only episode with a music score composed by Kim Richmond.
4	4	"Knockover"	Charles S. Dubin	Morton Fine	November 14, 1973
A murder victim's diamond ring compounds a homicide case with that of a big robbery. Lynette Mettey and Alex Rocco guest star. NOTE: Beginning with this episode, John Cacavas would compose the music score for the remainder of the series.
5	5	"Girl in the River"	William Hale	Halsted Welles	November 21, 1973
Kojak suspects that the strangler of seven women, known as Excalibur, has returned when another girl dies in similar circumstances. Alan Fudge and James Keach guest star.
6	6	"Requiem for a Cop"	Gary Nelson	Richard Adams & Jack Laird	November 28, 1973
Kojak races a 48-hour deadline to prevent the burial without honors of his old friend, an officer accused of corruption. Louise Latham, Michael Margotta and John Sylvester White guest star.
7	7	"The Corrupter"	Paul Stanley	James M. Miller	December 5, 1973
Kojak suspects that new store staff may be involved in murder of a jewelry store owner. Lola Albright, Scatman Crothers, Alfred Ryder, and Robert Webber guest star.
8	8	"Dark Sunday"	Charles R. Rondeau	Robert Malcolm Young	December 12, 1973
The murder of a car thief reveals vital clues to a $500,000 heist. Richard Jordan, Yvonne Craig, and Marc Alaimo guest star.
9	9	"Conspiracy of Fear"	Jeannot Szwarc	Jack Laird & Mark Rodgers	December 19, 1973
Kojak tries to hold up an urban re-development project until he solves a murder case. Nicholas Colasanto, William Prince, Gretchen Corbett and Larry Kert guest star.
10	10	"Cop in a Cage"	Charles S. Dubin	Gene R. Kearney & Alvin Sapinsley	January 2, 1974
Freshly freed from prison, a criminal jailed by Kojak wants revenge and is targeting Kojak's niece on her wedding day. John P. Ryan and Sally Kirkland guest star.
11	11	"Marker to a Dead Bookie"	Alex March	Morton Fine & Gene R. Kearney	January 16, 1974
Kojak pretends to be corrupted, not without opposition from Capt. McNeil, who tries save as much police money he can, to catch a narcotics dealer in the act. Lorraine Gary guest stars.
12	12	"Last Rites for a Dead Priest"	Joel Oliansky	Jack Laird	January 23, 1974
During a jeweler's convention, a jewel thief (Jackie Cooper) disguises himself as a priest in order to steal valuable gems.
13	13	"Death Is Not a Passing Grade"	Allen Reisner	Gene R. Kearney	January 30, 1974
While teaching a criminal justice class at a local college, Kojak embarrasses a student with a criminal background (James Woods), forcing him to leave a stolen item to have the upper hand in future classroom discussions. Pamela Hensley guest stars.
14	14	"Die Before They Wake"	Leo Penn	Robert W. Lenski	February 6, 1974
A junkie prostitute (Tina Louise) holds the key which would help solving the murder cases of her roommate and a local TV reporter. With Harris Yulin and Isabel Sanford.
15	15	"Deliver Us Some Evil"	Charles S. Dubin	Robert Malcolm Young	February 13, 1974
A small time crook (John Ritter) prepares to pull a big robbery to flee a pending murder charge.
16	16	"Eighteen Hours of Fear"	Charles R. Rondeau	Robert C. Dennis & Jack Laird	February 20, 1974
A woman (Lynne Marta) is coming back from winter holidays from Canada, smuggling two twenty Canadian dollar plates in her fake cast. Once she arrives in the US, she needs to run from an ex-partner in crime, who murdered her boyfriend and wants to get the plates back. With Chuck McCann.
17	17	"Before the Devil Knows"	Charles S. Dubin	Gene R. Kearney	February 27, 1974
A man has embezzled a million dollars in US Government bonds. Kojak taps the embezzler's phone and hears him hire a notorious hit man. Kojak has been after this hit man for many years, and he goes to the thief who stole the bonds from the embezzler with a proposition: Be a stool pigeon, sign a deposition, and return the bonds. In return Kojak will look the other way while the thief "gets away in the confusion", Kojak will catch the hit man, and the deposition will convict the embezzler. With Henry Darrow, Don Knight, Louise Sorel and David White.
18	18	"Dead on His Feet"	Jeannot Szwarc	Jack Laird	March 6, 1974
A detective (Harry Guardino) is hiding his terminal illness, while pursuing his partner's murderer. The detective is even more motivated to find the murderer even if he'll have to pay the highest price. With Joanne Linville and Malachi Throne.
19	19	"Down a Long and Lonely River"	Leo Penn	Robert Foster	March 20, 1974
A young psychologist asks Kojak for help after her fiancé (Paul Michael Glaser) attempts to settle an old score with the people who left him to take the whole rap for the crime which sent him to prison.
20	20	"Mojo"	Jeannot Szwarc	Morton Fine & Mark Weingart	March 27, 1974
Kojak goes undercover as a chemist in order to expose the thieves who stole morphine from an insurance company, to sell it at an inflated price. With Ed Lauter.
21	21	"Therapy in Dynamite"	Leo Penn	Gene R. Kearney	April 10, 1974
A psychopathic bomber targets people who hurt his friend, who is the wife of an adulterer. Kojak must find a link between the victims in order to find the suspect. With Dabney Coleman.
22	22	"The Only Way Out"	Joel Oliansky	Alvin Sapinsley	May 8, 1974
A 12-year-old boy wants Kojak's help in locating his missing father. The case takes an interesting twist in which Kojak is not led to the kid's missing father, but to a thief who fled to Brazil with stolen $25 million. With John Hillerman.

=== Season 2 (1974–75) ===
No. overall	No. in season	Title	Directed by	Written by	Original release date
23	1	"The Chinatown Murders"	Jeannot Szwarc	Jack Laird	September 15, 1974
24	2	"The Chinatown Murders"	Jeannot Szwarc	Jack Laird	September 15, 1974
A series of syndicate murders in Chinatown is leading to a small gang war. Kojak finds out that those murders are blamed on a pair of rival organizations so that the real culprits, made up of an amateurish foursome, can move in and take over the territory from the rival syndicate organizations composed of approximately a dozen men. Michael Constantine and Robert Ito guest star.
25	3	"Hush Now, Don't You Die"	Charles S. Dubin	Robert W. Lenski	September 22, 1974
A college girl has been kidnapped, taken to a warehouse and raped by two assassins. One is shot by another and the girl escapes. Her testimony would surely help find the other criminal but because of fear from publicly saying that she was raped, she's not going to police. Her father starts his own vendetta against the surviving rapist. Kojak must fight to find the truth about what actually happened that night.
26	4	"A Very Deadly Game"	Seymour Robbie	Sean Baine	September 29, 1974
A fellow policeman from Kojak's precinct is killed on duty. Theo learns the murderer is a well known criminal pursued by the Feds, which is after him in a major fraud case. Kojak goes all the way to Los Angeles, since he wants the criminal for murder, not fraud. Burr DeBenning guest stars.
27	5	"Wall Street Gunslinger"	Richard Donner	Halsted Welles	October 6, 1974
Kojak takes a case about fake stocks on Wall Street, which includes also three murders. With advice and coaching from a legit broker, Kojak goes undercover as a Greek millionaire to get into the office of a well-known broker and catch him when as soon as he tries to sell the stocks. When the thieves find out that the real Greek millionaire is in Venezuela, Theo is kidnapped. Alan Feinstein and Ben Masters guest star. NOTE: This episode marks the final time the first arrangement of the first Kojak main title theme is used. The theme was composed by Billy Goldenberg.
28	6	"Slay Ride"	Russ Mayberry	Morton Fine	October 13, 1974
In a hotel at an architects' convention, a couple of suicides occur. Kojak is convinced of a connection between the deaths. The story returns to a previous convention at which all of the victims were involved in a girl's rape and her sister's death. The dead girl was a soldier's girlfriend and he wants vengeance in finding (with the guidance of her sister) and killing all the people related to his girl's death. Stephen McHattie, Julie Gregg, Gordon Jump and Paul Benedict guest star. NOTE: First use of the second arrangement of the first Kojak main title theme. Composed by Billy Goldenberg.
29	7	"Nursemaid"	Jerry London	Joel Oliansky	October 20, 1974
A gun dealer is forced by a gang to sell them guns. Kojak, together with Crocker and Stavros, organize a raid on a gang-owned pub in which they find a vault with a large number of pistols. Kojak wants a dealer to testify against gang members, but the storekeeper is kidnapped and killed. A former gun-shop bookkeeper (Kay Medford) is also not so keen to testify, but Kojak warns that gang members will very likely find her soon, changing her mind. She's taken to a motel away from Manhattan but gangsters won't give up easily.
30	8	"You Can't Tell a Hurt Man How to Holler"	Seymour Robbie	Albert Ruben	October 27, 1974
A small-time criminal is suspected of murder but Kojak thinks he was framed and tries to find the real men responsible. The suspect doesn't want to cooperate but is eventually equipped with microphone and sent to his "friend's" flat to help the investigation and be set free.
31	9	"The Best Judge Money Can Buy"	Leo Penn	Gene R. Kearney	November 3, 1974
A judge died in odd circumstances and it's becoming obvious that he has been murdered, Kojak has to find out who did it, after coming to the conclusion that the judge was corrupted. The solution to the case rests in the hands of Mackie's father, likewise a judge who is upstanding before a moral dilemma when he needs to decide whether or not to set a known murderer free to cover up for his son's misdeeds. John Randolph and Abe Vigoda guest star.
32	10	"A Souvenir from Atlantic City"	Daniel Haller	Charles Sailor & Eric Kaldor	November 10, 1974
The only witness to a terrorist bombing also happens to be a police informer. In his efforts to locate the witness, Kojak must cooperate with another police precinct which is keeping the man under wraps as a reliable snitch. Meanwhile, the witness escapes custody to his sister's home in Atlantic City just as the terrorist group El Compadre prepares to strike against him. With Daniel J. Travanti.
33	11	"A Killing in the Second House"	Christian Nyby	Gene R. Kearney	November 17, 1974
A wealthy man hires a private detective to follow his wife as he suspects she has had an affair. The detective delivers photos in which the wife is seen with his assistant after the man kills himself. He wants to help the widow get the money from insurance company (and take his share, too), so he makes his ex-client's suicide looks like a murder. The case is given to Kojak, who knows the private detective is a former police detective from his precinct who had been fired for corruption. With Dimitra Arliss and Martin Balsam.
34	12	"The Best War in Town"	Richard Donner	Burton Armus	November 24, 1974
This is to be the first day of work for a rookie cop, but on the way to his precinct he sees men trying to strangle an individual. Kojak soon learns this is the beginning of a street war involving four rival gangs.
35	13	"Cross Your Heart and Hope to Die"	David Friedkin	Gene R. Kearney	December 1, 1974
The friend of a mentally disturbed woman (Andrea Marcovicci) thinks he is protecting her by murdering any men who get close to her, including Kojak.
36	14	"The Betrayal"	Telly Savalas	Joseph Polizzi	December 15, 1974
An informant (Paul Anka) uses a detective to further his own criminal career. Directed by Telly Savalas. Paul Picerni guest stars.
37	15	"Loser Takes All"	Allen Reisner	Story by : William P. McGivern & Robert C. Dennis; Teleplay by : Robert C. Dennis	December 22, 1974
A woman's (Ja'net DuBois) husband is murdered during the diamond heist she plotted with her lover (Leslie Nielsen). Antonio Fargas also guest stars.
38	16	"Close Cover Before Killing"	Sigmund Neufeld Jr.	Peter S. Fischer	January 5, 1975
Kojak is puzzled when a prosperous businessman (Alex Rocco) suddenly is accused of murder and arson. Erik Estrada and David Ackroyd guest star.
39	17	"Acts of Desperate Men"	Jeannot Szwarc	Gene R. Kearney	January 12, 1975
A sniper systematically eliminates a mild-mannered accountant's (Eugene Roche) boss and his associates. Elaine Joyce and Bruno Kirby guest star.
40	18	"Queen of the Gypsies"	Jeannot Szwarc	Story by : Gene Kearney & Arthur E. McLaird; Teleplay by : Gene Kearney	January 19, 1975
A Gypsy woman (Zohra Lampert), witness to a bank robbery, recruits the thieves for a heist involving six banks in one day. She then controls every aspect of Kojak's investigation while setting up the very same thieves. Kojak soon realizes she is one of the most incredible persons he has ever met. Note: In this classic episode, Lampert was awarded an Emmy award for her performance. Lane Smith guest stars.
41	19	"Night of the Piraeus"	Jerry London	Don Rene Patterson & George Bacos	January 26, 1975
A belt stolen from a Greek sailor causes three murders, but a witness appears unconcerned. Norman Lloyd, Ivor Francis, and Thaao Penghlis guest stars.
42	20	"Elegy in an Asphalt Graveyard"	Christian Nyby	Jack Laird	February 2, 1975
The murder of a Manhattan playgirl affects several lives, including Kojak's. With guest Priscilla Pointer.
43	21	"The Goodluck Bomber"	Sigmund Neufeld Jr.	Ray Brenner	February 9, 1975
A series of bombings involving devices that cannot be defused frustrates Kojak. With guest Jack Ging.
44	22	"Unwanted Partners"	Sigmund Neufeld Jr.	Burton Armus	February 16, 1975
Crocker is torn when an old school chum is the prime suspect in the investigation of a protection racket.
45	23	"Two-Four-Six for Two Hundred"	Russ Mayberry	James M. Miller	February 23, 1975
A thief tries unsuccessfully to steal a painter's truck, then sits in jail while his lawyer (Robert Loggia) fails to arrange bail.
46	24	"The Trade-Off"	David Friedkin	Robert E. Swanson	March 2, 1975
A narcotics dealer (Mark Stevens) facing prosecution kidnaps Capt. McNeil's wife and demands Kojak return the evidence.
47	25	"I Want to Report a Dream"	Telly Savalas	Gene R. Kearney	March 9, 1975
A psychic (Ruth Gordon) reports to the police a dream in which she sees a murder committed; co-starring Tracy Reed.

=== Season 3 (1975–76) ===
No. overall	No. in season	Title	Directed by	Written by	Original release date
48	1	"A Question of Answers"	Jerry London	Albert Ruben	September 14, 1975
49	2	"A Question of Answers"	Jerry London	Albert Ruben	September 14, 1975
A man tries to clear his name by helping Kojak trap a loan shark. Eli Wallach, Michael V. Gazzo, Jennifer Warren, Jerry Orbach, Allan Rich, and F. Murray Abraham guest star. Note: This two-part episode was originally broadcast as a single 2-hour episode. George Savalas is credited as "George Savalas" for the first time, having previously been credited as "Demosthenes" in Seasons 1–2.
50	3	"My Brother, My Enemy"	Russ Mayberry	Alvin Boretz	September 21, 1975
Kojak resists outside pressures to protect a fellow detective (Sylvester Stallone) who accidentally shot a boy. Guest Star: Claude Earl Jones.
51	4	"Sweeter Than Life"	Russ Mayberry	Burton Armus	September 28, 1975
Lt. Kojak asks an ex-addict (Neville Brand) to help his nephew, who seems to be hooked on drugs and involved in a murder. Guest Star: Michael Mullins as Johnny
52	5	"Be Careful What You Pray For"	Russ Mayberry	James M. Miller	October 5, 1975
Crocker lectures female students on rape at a Catholic school, while two Puerto Rican brothers attack a priest during a truck heist.
53	6	"Secret Snow, Deadly Snow"	Jerry London	Morton Fine	October 12, 1975
Kojak is determined to nail a big-time drug dealer who shot a plastic surgeon, even though the man was already dead from what they at first believe to be natural causes.
54	7	"Life, Liberation, and the Pursuit of Death"	Nicholas Sgarro	Gene R. Kearney	October 26, 1975
A woman who witnesses a body being dumped into the harbor is so fragile that the killer tries to use psychology against her in order to eliminate her. With William Katt.
55	8	"Out of the Frying Pan..."	Charles S. Dubin	Jack Laird	November 2, 1975
A veteran cop, battling alcoholism and demoted after being held responsible for the shooting death of his close friend, impedes Kojak's murder investigation as he tries to clear his name and win back his gold shield. With Eugene Roche.
56	9	"Over the Water"	Telly Savalas	Burton Armus	November 9, 1975
After Kojak breaks up a barroom brawl he started, a mobster's son puts out a contract on Kojak's life.
57	10	"The Nicest Guys on the Block"	Charles S. Dubin	Morton Fine	November 16, 1975
A colleague of Kojak's, Detective Weaver, discovers that a former high school buddy is now involved in fencing a million dollars' worth of stolen diamonds.
58	11	"No Immunity for Murder"	Andy Sidaris	Joe Gores	November 23, 1975
Refusing to believe that a prostitute and her partner are responsible for a bookkeeper's murder, Kojak runs afoul of the FBI when he tries to investigate. With Gregory Walcott and Robert Alda.
59	12	"A Long Way from Time Square"	Ernest Pintoff	Story by : Brian McKay; Teleplay by : Gene R. Kearney	November 30, 1975
Kojak and Crocker head to Cory County, Nevada to pick up a witness, but encounter trouble in town. With Judy Kaye.
60	13	"Money Back Guarantee"	Daniel Haller	Dallas L. Barnes	December 7, 1975
The murder of a careless patrolman plunges Kojak and staff on the trail of a stolen car ring, which owes its success to the willingness of its victims. With David Ogden Stiers.
61	14	"A House of Prayer, a Den of Thieves"	Robert Day	Gene R. Kearney	December 14, 1975
A former detective (Vincent Gardenia), now with the Las Vegas police force, collars a "retired" counterfeiter and calls his ex-boss, Kojak, to come get his prisoner, only to have someone prefer him dead. With Eileen Brennan.
62	15	"How Cruel the Frost, How Bright the Stars"	David Friedkin	Story by : James McAdams & Gene R. Kearney; Teleplay by : Gene R. Kearney	December 21, 1975
On Christmas Eve, Kojak and colleagues find their hands full after a distraught husband mistakenly tries to shoot a woman who looks like his wife. With Veronica Hamel.
63	16	"The Forgotten Room"	Sigmund Neufeld Jr.	James Bonnet	January 4, 1976
When a Greek immigrant is accused of murdering a prostitute, Kojak meets resistance from his employer, a widowed Greek woman.
64	17	"On the Edge"	David Friedkin	Alvin Boretz	January 11, 1976
A detective's (Forrest Tucker) obsession with his work is jeopardizing his family life, his career and a case involving the head of a stolen jewelry racket.
65	18	"A Wind from Corsica"	Daniel Haller	Story by : Paul Stein & Charles Watts; Teleplay by : Mark Rodgers & Barry Trivers	January 18, 1976
Dominic Bruno unknowingly catches a highly communicable disease from his dying brother, an escaped convict, who makes Bruno promise to kill the man who framed him.
66	19	"Bad Dude"	Sigmund Neufeld Jr.	Joe Gores	January 25, 1976
A man (Roosevelt Grier) seems to be purposefully setting himself up as a target for a hired killer, and doesn't want the police to interfere.
67	20	"A Grave Too Soon"	Daniel Haller	Jack Laird	February 1, 1976
Kojak puts the pressure on a known member of an organized crime syndicate when a dead undercover cop is found murdered. With Diana Hyland and Daniel J. Travanti.
68	21	"The Frame"	Sigmund Neufeld Jr.	Burton Armus	February 8, 1976
Kojak finds himself under investigation by Internal Affairs when a thief he arrested without sufficient evidence claims he paid Kojak a bribe.
69	22	"Deadly Innocence"	Daniel Haller	Sean Baine	February 15, 1976
A father (Tige Andrews) pushes his son to go to any lengths to continue the coverup of a frame he arranged to get revenge for an accident that paralyzed another son. Note: Kevin Dobson does not appear in this episode.
70	23	"Justice Deferred"	Charles S. Dubin	Jack Laird	February 22, 1976
A multi-millionaire construction tycoon (Michael Ansara) remains calm in the face of Kojak's investigation of a murder he helped cover up with concrete 18 years before. With Gail Strickland. Note: Kevin Dobson does not appear in this episode.
71	24	"Both Sides of the Law"	David Friedkin	Gene R. Kearney	March 7, 1976
A private detective with a world-wide reputation for getting results competes with Kojak to find priceless Rembrandt drawings which disappeared from a gallery, even though the thieves were caught at the crime site. With Susan Sullivan

=== Season 4 (1976–77) ===
No. overall	No. in season	Title	Directed by	Written by	Original release date
72	1	"Birthday Party"	Sigmund Neufeld Jr.	Story by : Robert Hoskins & Steven Carabatsos; Teleplay by : Steven Carabatsos	September 26, 1976
Kojak works against time to locate desperate criminals who have kidnapped his niece to force him to release one of their accomplices. With Richard Gere.
73	2	"A Summer Madness"	Jeannot Szwarc	Story by : Jack Laird; Teleplay by : William P. McGivern	October 3, 1976
A mysterious bomber kills innocent victims by tossing a molotov cocktail through the window af a Manhattan restaurant.
74	3	"Law Dance"	Edward M. Abroms	James M. Miller	October 10, 1976
Kojak and Crocker have difficulty in the courts when a new trial for a convicted murderer threatens to set him free. With Sharon Gless and Martin Kove (both of whom would co-star a few years later in another CBS police drama, Cagney & Lacey).
75	4	"Out of the Shadows"	Jeannot Szwarc	Gene R. Kearney	October 17, 1976
Kojak and his men arrest a psychotic killer who has been terrorizing Manhattan with a series of seemingly indiscriminate murders, but his confession takes a bizarre turn.
76	5	"A Need to Know"	Russ Mayberry	Story by : Stewart Alexander & Cire Rodlak & Chester Krumholz; Teleplay by : Chester Krumholz	October 24, 1976
A child molester is arrested, but Kojak is ordered to release him because he works for a foreign embassy and has diplomatic immunity. Featuring Héctor Elizondo and Al Freeman, Jr.
77	6	"An Unfair Trade"	Nicholas Sgarro	Burton Armus	October 31, 1976
Two patrol cops are caught in the backlash of an angry neighborhood when one of the cops is forced to kill a Hispanic youth during a struggle. Guest star David Selby.
78	7	"A Hair-Trigger Away"	Sigmund Neufeld Jr.	Story by : Anderson House & Jack Epps, Jr. Teleplay by : Chester Krumholz	November 7, 1976
A heroin addict tries to kick her habit with the aid of her boyfriend, Lt. Giddings, whose status is jeopardized after he accidentally kills another cop. With Lynn Redgrave and Morgan Fairchild.
79	8	"By Silence Betrayed"	Sigmund Neufeld Jr.	Chester Krumholz	November 14, 1976
Kojak's investigation into the killing of several dock workers is complicated by the workers' code of silence and efforts to clean up their own house. With Sally Kirkland.
80	9	"A Shield for Murder"	Jeannot Szwarc	Story by : Robert Malcolm Young & William P. McGivern; Teleplay by : William P. McGivern	November 21, 1976
81	10	"A Shield for Murder"	Jeannot Szwarc	Story by : Robert Malcolm Young & William P. McGivern; Teleplay by : William P. McGivern	November 21, 1976
A wealthy, power-wielding New York State County Chairman (Geraldine Page) uses her influence to protect her grandson, with help from a corrupt cop (Kenneth McMillan). Kojak confronts a politically influential woman while trying to save a young woman (Mary Beth Hurt).
82	11	"The Pride and the Princess"	Charles S. Dubin	James M. Miller	November 28, 1976
A Yugoslavian princess hunts for priceless family jewels stolen at the end of World War II and now hidden somewhere in New York City. With Maria Schell.
83	12	"Black Thorn"	Charles S. Dubin	Leon Tokatyan	December 5, 1976
Salathiel Harms (Roosevelt Grier) returns as a bounty hunter who is after a desperate man who jumped bail in San Francisco.
84	13	"Where Do You Go When You Have No Place To Go?"	Jeannot Szwarc	Story by : Chester Krumholz & James McAdams; Teleplay by : Chester Krumholz	December 12, 1976
A hot-tempered Indian accidentally kills a construction boss and finds a fortune in stolen diamonds. With Blair Brown and Stephen Macht.
85	14	"Dead Again"	Sigmund Neufeld Jr.	Burton Armus	December 19, 1976
Kojak links the threats against a young girl's life and a bomber's extortion demands. With Simon Oakland and Brooke Adams.
86	15	"The Godson"	Russ Mayberry	Joseph Polizzi	January 2, 1977
Kojak's 17-year-old godson, who hasn't seen Theo for more than 10 years, is in for a lot of trouble with criminals and the law. With Brian Dennehy and Rosalind Cash.
87	16	"The Condemned"	Noel Black	Story by : Michael Grais & Mark Victor and Anthony Spinner; Teleplay by : Anthony Spinner	January 11, 1977
After he discovers his unfaithful wife murdered, a prizefighter goes berserk and holds innocent victims hostage in a church. With Dorian Harewood and Ken Foree. Guest: Roscoe Orman as Lt. Connons.
88	17	"When You Hear the Beep, Drop Dead"	Jeannot Szwarc	Gene R. Kearney	January 18, 1977
A wealthy ecologist's wife plans to do away with her husband and frame a non-existent call girl for the murder. With Eric Braeden, Susan Sullivan and Joe Turkel.
89	18	"I Was Happy Where I Was"	Nicholas Sgarro	Story by : Jerrold Freedman & Sean Baine; Teleplay by : Sean Baine	January 25, 1977
Kojak tries to head off a barrio gang war when he investigates a street murder.
90	19	"Kojak's Days: Part 1"	Charles S. Dubin	Story by : Chester Krumholz & Matthew Rapf; Teleplay by : Chester Krumholz	February 1, 1977
An unidentified corpse in a stolen Rolls-Royce is found the same morning a wife kills her husband and abandons her child, leaving a trail that could lead to her suicide. With Maud Adams, William Hurt, Ken Kercheval, Louise Sorel, and Michael Tolan.
91	20	"Kojak's Days: Part 2"	Charles S. Dubin	Story by : Chester Krumholz & Matthew Rapf; Teleplay by : Chester Krumholz	February 8, 1977
More facts come to light regarding the body stuffed in the trunk of a Rolls-Royce.
92	21	"Monkey on a String"	Ernest Pintoff	Jack Laird	February 15, 1977
A member of the police force falls prey to a powerful crime figure. With Albert Paulsen and Judith Light.
93	22	"Kiss It All Goodbye"	Telly Savalas	Story by : Robert W. Lenski; Teleplay by : Oliver Crawford & Robert W. Lenski	February 22, 1977
Alerted to a fur robbery in a double-cross by one of the thieves, Crocker inadvertently shoots a young woman, crippling her for life. With Carol Lynley and Christopher Walken.
94	23	"Lady in the Squadroom"	Edward M. Abroms	Burton Armus	March 8, 1977
Kojak is not happy when a lady cop is assigned to his division, and neither is she, but they find they have to work together as cops whether they like it or not. With George Maharis, Joan Van Ark, and Louis Zorich.
95	24	"Sister Maria"	Ernest Pintoff	Story by : Ross Teel & Charles Sailor & Eric Kaldor; Teleplay by : Ross Teel	March 15, 1977
A nun seeks revenge against a man responsible for the death of her sister. With Season Hubley, Murray Hamilton, and Gloria Grahame.
96	25	"Another Gypsy Queen"	Joel Oliansky	Gene R. Kearney	March 22, 1977
A gypsy queen plays both ends against the middle in attempting to locate a man she thinks is responsible for killing gypsies. NOTE: This episode marks the final time the second arrangement of the first Kojak main title theme is used. The theme was composed by Billy Goldenberg.

=== Season 5 (1977–78) ===
No. overall	No. in season	Title	Directed by	Written by	Original release date
97	1	"The Queen of Hearts Is Wild"	Leo Penn	Donald P. Bellisario	October 2, 1977
The girlfriend of a gangster who hates Kojak is the only witness to a cop's murder. With Paula Kelly. NOTE: First use of the second Kojak main title theme used for the show's final season. Composed by John Cacavas.
98	2	"A Strange Kind of Love"	Sutton Roley	Joseph Polizzi	October 9, 1977
A psychotic murderer thinks a radio talk show host is encouraging him to murder people she criticizes. With Lee Bryant.
99	3	"Laid Off"	Nicholas Sgarro	Burton Armus	October 16, 1977
A laid-off officer with two jobs and a sick wife takes a bribe under pressure from a loan shark.
100	4	"Cry for the Kids"	Leo Penn	David Taylor	October 23, 1977
A teenager accidentally kills a gangster's bag man while robbing him, only to have a rival gangster hire him to take out the competition. With Carmine Caridi.
101	5	"Once More from Birdland"	Nicholas Sgarro	Gene R. Kearney	October 30, 1977
A singer (Andrea Marcovicci) is out to prove her wrongfully imprisoned father innocent after he spends 14 years in prison.
102	6	"Caper on a Quiet Street"	Edward M. Abroms	Michael Wagner	November 6, 1977
A woman (Candice Azzara) is Kojak's only link to finding $6 million, but her boyfriend (Armand Assante) has other plans.
103	7	"Letters of Death"	Nicholas Sgarro	L.T. Bentwood, Marvin Kupfer & William A. Schwartz	November 13, 1977
Anonymous messages begin turning up informing a model that someone close to her is in danger. With Cristina Raines.
104	8	"Tears for All Who Love Her"	Joel Oliansky	Chester Krumholz, John Meredyth Lucas & Ross Teel	November 20, 1977
Crocker falls for a woman (Jennifer Warren) while investigating the death of her mobster husband. With Sam Jaffe.
105	9	"The Summer of '69: Part 1"	Gene R. Kearney	Gene R. Kearney	December 4, 1977
A man is released from prison, and a woman who rides with him to New York is found murdered in his abandoned car (with the MO of a dead serial killer). Rosalind Chao guest stars.
106	10	"The Summer of '69: Part 2"	Gene R. Kearney	Gene R. Kearney	December 10, 1977
After Kojak is placed on suspension, he continues to review the 8-year old case while a serial killer (Stephen McHattie) strikes again.
107	11	"Case Without a File"	Nicholas Sgarro	Joe Gores	December 17, 1977
Kojak poses as a murdered private investigator to find out why he was murdered. With Angel Tompkins.
108	12	"I Could Kill My Wife's Lawyer"	Russ Mayberry	Gene R. Kearney & Harriet Margulies	December 24, 1977
A detective believes that his wife's crooked divorce lawyer (David Ladd) hired an arsonist to destroy his boat.
109	13	"Justice for All"	Jim Benson	Michael Kozoll & Ross Teel	January 7, 1978
While Kojak is contemplating leaving the police department to become a law firm's investigator, a series of recent drug-related deaths begin to overshadow his decision.
110	14	"Mouse"	Harvey S. Laidman	Art Eisenson	January 21, 1978
Kojak encounters a case where a highly respected surgeon may be doing unnecessary surgeries in order to use the money to pay off gambling debts.
111	15	"Chain of Custody"	Russ Mayberry	Chester Krumholz & Matthew Rapf	January 28, 1978
Kojak is suspended after reacting to an incompetent district attorney who failed to convict a known killer.
112	16	"The Captain's Brother's Wife"	Charles S. Dubin	Rift Fournier & Chester Krumholz	February 4, 1978
Kojak tries to protect Captain McNeil's widowed sister-in-law (Shelley Winters) from gamblers.
113	17	"No License to Kill"	Ernest Pintoff	Bob Bralver, Charlene Bralver & Gene R. Kearney	February 11, 1978
Kojak is assigned to help a resentful police officer search for a professional hit man.
114	18	"The Halls of Terror"	Edward M. Abroms	Chester Krumholz	February 18, 1978
Kojak and the detectives go undercover in a local hospital in order to investigate a string of murders that have been occurring while the victims were on duty. With Meeno Peluce.
115	19	"May the Horse Be With You"	Charles S. Dubin	Rift Fournier	February 25, 1978
A 40-year veteran officer is shot attempting to prevent the theft of a race horse that he illegally housed in the NYPD stables. With Jeff Conaway, Steve Franken, and Roz Kelly.
116	20	"Photo Must Credit Joe Paxton"	Jim Benson	Gene R. Kearney	March 4, 1978
A paparazzi photographer (Tige Andrews) becomes the prime suspect in a jewel theft and phony kidnapping of a former actress (Antoinette Bower) he has pursued for years. With Arte Johnson and Andrew Robinson.
117	21	"60 Miles to Hell"	Gene R. Kearney	Mike Frankovich Jr. & Gene R. Kearney	March 11, 1978
Crocker is taken hostage while trying to transport a prisoner from Vegas to New York. With Priscilla Barnes, Gianni Russo, Liberace.
118	22	"In Full Command"	Telly Savalas	Chester Krumholz	March 18, 1978
After being rejected for a promotion, a disgruntled inspector (Danny Thomas) sees a current case as a way to boost his career. Note: This is the series finale.

=== TV movies (1985–90) ===
No.	Title	Directed by	Written by	Original release date
1	Kojak: The Belarus File	Robert Markowitz	Albert Ruben	February 16, 1985
The murders of several elderly Russian men lead Kojak to a group of Nazi war criminals who are living in America with the full knowledge and approval of the U.S. Government. With guest stars Suzanne Pleshette and Max von Sydow. (Last appearances of Dan Frazer as Frank McNeil, George Savalas as Stavros, Mark Russell as Saperstein, and Vince Conti as Rizzo.)
2	Kojak: The Price of Justice	Alan Metzger	Albert Ruben	February 21, 1987
When the bodies of two young boys are discovered in the Harlem River, their mother is the obvious suspect, particularly with her scandalous past. But Kojak believes that she is innocent.
3	Kojak: Ariana	Paul Krasny	Maurice Hurley	November 4, 1989
During a stroll in an amusement park, Inspector Kojak finds a small Greek girl named Ariana. As she speaks only Greek, Kojak is the only man who can communicate with her and learn her name and hometown. There are no other leads, and the family is nowhere to be found. Kojak, with the aid of young detective Winston Blake, is about to learn that the case won't be all about the girl and that the key to solving it lies in Kojak's past. With guest stars Hector Elizondo and Shari Headley. (First appearance of Andre Braugher as Detective Winston Blake.)
4	Kojak: Fatal Flaw	Richard Compton	Albert Ruben	December 2, 1989
Popular book writer is murdered. Kojak finds out that shortly before his death he was working on a book about the mafia, so the mob is automatically his number one suspect. The case won't be that straightforward as new developments shift the investigation toward a young actor and a writer's wife who is a longtime friend of Kojak. Angie Dickinson, Richard Jenkins and Steven Weber are featured.
5	Kojak: Flowers for Matty	Paul Krasny	Peyton Webb	January 6, 1990
A fellow cop and Kojak's close friend is shot to death. Theo immediately starts an investigation, but to his dismay the case is taken away from him by the Internal Affairs Bureau, as his killed friend is suspected of bribery. Regardless of that, Kojak's continuing his own private research, as he believes in the detective's innocence. Cast includes Glynnis O'Connor and Ed Lauter.
6	Kojak: It's Always Something	Richard Compton	Jack Laird	February 3, 1990
Theo's former colleague and protégé, Bobby Crocker (Kevin Dobson), is now an assistant district attorney. Crocker prosecutes Kojak's current right-hand man, Winston Blake, for the murder of a call girl. Darren McGavin also stars. (Last appearance of Kevin Dobson as Bobby Crocker.)
7	Kojak: None So Blind	Alan Metzger	Story by : Scott Shepherd; Teleplay by : Jack Laird & Scott Shepherd	April 7, 1990
Kojak investigates a tycoon (Rip Torn) and a mobster (Jerry Orbach) in connection with a plot involving money, women and murder. Marcia Gay Harden is an eyewitness to a crime, and Amanda Plummer, Terry Kinney and James Remar also have guest roles.
