= Robert Q. Lovett =

American film editor (c.1927–2022)

- Born: c. 1927
- Died: August 18, 2022 (aged 95)
- Other name: R. Q. Lovett
- Occupation: Film editor
- Years active: 1963–2006

Robert Quincy Lovett (c. 1927 – August 18, 2022) was an American film editor who was nominated at the 57th Academy Awards in the category of Best Film Editing for his work on The Cotton Club. He also participated in the Festival De Cannes for A Bronx Tale, directed by Robert De Niro in 2011. He worked on over 30 films and TV shows from 1963 to 2006.

Lovett died on August 18, 2022, at the age of 95.

== Filmography ==
=== Editing ===
==== Film ====
Year	Title	Notes
1963	Violent Midnight	
1970	End of the Road	
1970	Cotton Comes to Harlem	
1971	One of Those Things	
1971	Desperate Characters	
1974	The Taking of Pelham One Two Three	
1976	The Next Man	
1978	Once in Paris...	
1980	Running Scared	Also second unit director
1981	Just Before Dawn	
1982	Hammett	Also music editor
1983	The Golden Seal	
1984	The Cotton Club	
1993	A Bronx Tale	
2006	Vanaja	

==== Television ====
Year	Title	Notes
1976–1977	Kojak	3 episodes
1979	The Fantastic Seven	Television film
1985–1987	The Equalizer	27 episodes
1987	Kojak: The Price of Justice	Television film
1989	Kojak: Ariana	Television film
1990	Kojak: None So Blind	Television film
1991	The Last Prostitute	Television film
1995–1996	Central Park West	3 episodes
1997–1998	Dellaventura	3 episodes
