= Burton Armus =

American actor, writer and television producer (1934–2024)

Burton S. Armus (December 11, 1934 – April 8, 2024) was an American police officer, actor, writer and television producer.

== Life and career ==
Armus was born on December 11, 1934. His Hollywood career began when, while he was still serving as an NYPD detective assigned to the 48th Squad in the Bronx, he was hired to be the technical advisor on the TV series N.Y.P.D. in 1967. He also wrote the episode "Boys Night Out" for that series. Later, still a serving detective, he was picked by Telly Savalas to act as a technical adviser on the Kojak series. He also acted in three of the episodes, and wrote nine of them. Following his retirement from the police department he moved to Los Angeles and became a successful writer and producer. He later retired from this second career. Director Richard Donner, who directed three episodes of Kojak, named a detective in his blockbuster film Superman after Armus. The villain "Armus" in "Skin of Evil," an episode of Star Trek: The Next Generation, was named after Armus in a humorous slight from the writers.

Armus died on April 8, 2024, at the age of 89.

== Awards ==
In 1994, Armus won a Humanitas Prize for 60 Minute Category (NYPD Blue; 1993), which was shared with David Milch. He received two Emmy Award nominations that same year, one for Outstanding Individual Achievement in Writing in a Drama Series (NYPD Blue) and the other for Outstanding Drama Series (NYPD Blue). He garnered another Emmy nomination in 1995, for Outstanding Drama Series (NYPD Blue).

== Filmography ==
=== Actor ===
- Kojak (Three episodes)
- Inside Moves

=== Writer ===
- Tarzan - The Epic Adventures (pilot episode)
- Airwolf (Three episodes)
- Star Trek: The Next Generation (Two episodes)
- NYPD Blue (Six episodes)
- Street Hawk (One episode)
- The New Dragnet (Eight episodes)
- The New Adam-12 (Eight episodes)
- The Fall Guy (Two episodes)
- Cassie & Company (Three episodes)
- Paris (One episode)
- CHiPs (One episode)
- Policewoman (Two episodes)
- Kojak (Nine episodes)
- N.Y.P.D. (One episode)

=== Producer ===
- The New Adam-12 (20 episodes)
- The New Dragnet (26 episodes)
- Airwolf (1st Season)
- Star Trek: The Next Generation
- NYPD Blue
- Knight Rider
- Street Hawk

=== Technical advisor ===
- N.Y.P.D. (four episodes)
- Delvecchio (four episodes)
- Kojak (Ninety-five episodes)
