= Hellinger's Law =

- Genre: Crime; Drama
- Screenplay by: Lawrence Vail; Jack Laird
- Story by: Lawrence Vail; Ted Leighton
- Directed by: Leo Penn
- Starring: Telly Savalas; Morgan Stevens; Roy Poole; Ja'Net Dubois; Melinda Dillon
- Music by: John Cacavas
- Country of origin: United States
- Original language: English

Production
- Executive producers: Jack Laird; James Duff McAdams
- Producer: Chas. Floyd Johnson
- Production location: Houston
- Cinematography: Charles Correll
- Editors: John J. Dumas; Leon Ortiz-Gil; Bill Parker
- Running time: 100 minutes
- Production company: Universal Television

Original release
- Network: CBS
- Release: March 10, 1981

Hellinger's Law is a 1981 TV movie starring Telly Savalas, and directed by Leo Penn. It was the pilot for a proposed TV series starring Savalas which was not made, and was screened as a stand-alone film.

== Cast ==
- Telly Savalas as Nick Hellinger
- Morgan Stevens as Andy Clay
- Ja'Net DuBois as Dottie Singer
- Roy Poole as Judge Carroll
- Rod Taylor as Clint Tolliver
- Melinda Dillon as Anne Gronouski
- James Sutorius as Lon Braden
- Tom McFadden as Detective Roy Donovan
- Lisa Blake Richards as Cara Braden
- Kyle Richards as Julie Braden
- Arlen Dean Snyder as Da Fred Whedon
- Thom Christopher as Bill Rossetti

== Production ==
Filming was to have begun on 27 February 1980 but was pushed back, reportedly to iron out script problems. Several days of filming took place at the Crutcher Ranch in Fulshear, Texas in April of that year. Fulshear is located about 40 miles west of Houston. About a hundred local residents were used as extras for several of the outdoor scenes.

"I know some people are thinking it's a pilot," said Savalas at the time. "I didn't think that way. I made a two-hour movie. But doing it as a series would be different. Kojak was easy because I was playing Telly for the most part. It was a role I could ad lib. Although I could play a credible lawyer, I know nothing about the law. I'd be more dependent on the scriptwriters." Savalas said if the series went ahead he would want to make the character come from New York rather than Philadelphia. "Telly's from New York, and if you do a series you want to make it comfortable for the actor. It'd have to be close to my roots so I wouldn't have to worry about my speech pattern."

== Novelization ==
In December 1980, approximately three months before the telefilm aired, Jove Books released a novelization of the teleplay. The legal-sounding by-line is by author "Justin Barr", which is probably a pseudonym as it appears on no other published work, and novelization commissions tend to go to writers with prior book credits. The cover features a still of Savalas and a price of $2.25.
