= Kojak: The Price of Justice =

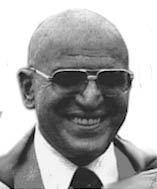
- Genre: Drama; Thriller
- Based on: The Investigation by Dorothy Uhnak
- Written by: Abby Mann; Albert Ruben
- Directed by: Alan Metzger
- Starring: Telly Savalas; Kate Nelligan; Pat Hingle
- Theme music composer: Patrick Williams
- Country of origin: United States

Production
- Executive producer: James Duff McAdams
- Producer: Albert Ruben
- Cinematography: Victor J. Kemper
- Editor: Robert Q. Lovett
- Running time: 95 min.
- Production company: Universal Television

Original release
- Network: CBS
- Release: February 21, 1987

Kojak: The Price of Justice is a 1987 made-for-television film based on the 1973–1978 TV series Kojak, starring Telly Savalas as Theo Kojak.

== Plot ==
Kojak is on a new case, the bodies of two young boys are found in the Harlem river. Their mother (Kate Nelligan) is the main obvious suspect, particularly with her scandalous past, but Kojak believes that she is innocent. Soon afterward the boys' father (Pat Hingle) kills himself. Kojak and his new assistant (John Bedford Lloyd) have to sort things out and solve the case which isn't going to be as straightforward a task as it seems.

== Cast and characters ==
- Kate Nelligan as Kitty
- Pat Hingle as George
- Jack Thompson as Aubrey Dubose
- Brian Murray as District Attorney Neary
- John Bedford Lloyd as Bass
- Jeffrey DeMunn as Marsucci
- Tony DiBenedetto as Detective Catalano
- Ron Frazier as J.T. Williams
- Stephen Joyce as Chief Brisco
- Earl Hindman as Danny
- James Rebhorn as Quibro
- Martin Shakar as Arnold Nadler
- Joseph Carberry as Lorenzo
- Fausto Bara as Benjamin

== Production ==
The cast included Australian actor Jack Thompson.
