= List of Dragnet (1989 TV series) episodes =

This is a list of episodes for the Dragnet television series that began in 1989, also known as The New Dragnet.

== Series overview ==
Season	Episodes	Originally released	
Season	Episodes	First released	Last released
1	26	October 24, 1989	January 21, 1990
2	26	April 14, 1990	September 9, 1990

== Episodes ==
=== Season 1 (1989–90) ===
No. overall	No. in season	Title	Directed by	Written by	Original release date	Prod. code
1	1	"The Twisted Triangle"	Georg Fenady	Joseph Gunn	October 24, 1989	106
A woman claims that she was raped in the middle of the day in the elevator leading to her apartment. Her rich and influential husband demands immediate police action, but as Daniels and Molina vigorously pursue the investigation, elements of the woman's story don't seem to quite add up.
2	2	"The Living Victim"	Charles Bail	Burton Armus	October 26, 1989	103
When factory worker Joe Flynn's body is found inside a parked car, Molina and Daniels have their hands full with a long list of suspects, all of whom are happy to learn that the universally disliked man is dead.
3	3	"The Payback"	Georg Fenady	Elliott Anderson	October 31, 1989	110
Daniels and Molina are assigned to the homicide of Darrell Fowler, a reclusive ex-Marine turned wealthy real estate developer. The investigation begins with an interview of Fowler's business partner, Emmett Stone, which leads the detectives to investigate the source of Fowler's wealth; Fowler had grown up in foster homes and joined the Marine Corps virtually penniless, but when he was discharged four years later he was a multimillionaire.
4	4	"The Bigamist"	Charles Bail	Steve Johnson	November 2, 1989	107
Distraught Lauren Taylor arrives at the station claiming that her husband has stolen all her possessions and cleaned out their bank accounts. Daniels and Molina explain to her that her husband did nothing wrong but agree to take one shot at finding him. They go to his place of employment only to discover that he quit without notice. After talking to an employee, they pull the man's office phone records and follow up on a number that appears frequently. There, they find another woman claiming to be his wife who has a similar story to Lauren's.
5	5	"Cardiac Arrest"	Georg Fenady	Stan Berkowitz	November 7, 1989	105
Daniels and Molina are called to the upscale Mayfield Hotel, where Steven Lewis was found dead from an apparent heart attack. Although the case seems routine, a few small details — the doctor leaving the scene hurriedly because he can't stand the sight of a dead body, and the victim never being seen the hotel staff — don't add up and, during a lull in police work, the detectives decide to look deeper into the deceased's life.
6	6	"Automated Muggings"	Georg Fenady	Joseph Gunn	November 9, 1989	102
Daniels and Molina are assigned to work a series of robberies where a lone gunman holds up individuals after they have made withdrawals from an automated teller machine. One curious aspect of the investigation is that every robbery takes place when patrol cars in the area are occupied on other calls.
7	7	"The Connection"	Bob Bralver	John Alan Schwartz	November 14, 1989	115
Working out of Homicide, Daniels and Moilna catch the case of star high school quarterback Rick Randall, who is found dead in a park with crack in his possession. Yet as they pursue the investigation, everyone tells them that Rick was a clean, fit and healthy athlete who would never touch drugs.
8	8	"The Calculator"	Georg Fenady	Alan Moskowitz	November 16, 1989	113
While working out of Accident Investigation Division, Daniels and Molina are assigned the case of Marianna Stringer, a flight attendant who, upon stepping out of her car, was run down and killed in the early hours of the morning.
9	9	"Who Killed My Boat?"	Charles Bail	Burton Armus	November 21, 1989	118
The theft of Greg Elias' boat is reported by his lawyer, and Daniels and Molina investigate why Elias is reluctant to talk to them. The boat is a speedboat whose main use is drug smuggling and the man has long been suspected of being involved with drugs, but the police have never been able to prove anything.
10	10	"The Triple Cross"	Charles Bail	Joseph Gunn	November 23, 1989	122
11	11	"DOA Cop"	Charles Bail	Nancy Ann Miller	November 28, 1989	112
12	12	"Where's Sadie?"	Dennis Donnelly	Alan Moskowitz	November 28, 1989	123
13	13	"Nouveau Gypsies"	Charles Bail	Alan Moskowitz	November 30, 1989	108
14	14	"Safe in Jail"	Georg Fenady	Burton Armus	December 5, 1989	126
15	15	"Weekend Warrior"	Georg Fenady	Elliott Anderson	December 7, 1989	125
16	16	"Strawberries Are in Season"	Charles Bail	E. Nick Alexander	December 12, 1989	111
17	17	"Coyote Captive"	Charles Bail	Stan Berkowitz	December 14, 1989	121
18	18	"The Plumber"	Georg Fenady	Burton Armus	December 19, 1989	101
19	19	"The Vandals"	Bob Bralver	Steve Johnson	December 21, 1989	119
20	20	"Armored Truck 211s"	Bob Bralver	Paul Savage	December 26, 1989	116
21	21	"To Steal a Child"	Bob Bralver	E. Nick Alexander	January 2, 1990	120
22	22	"Dead Samaritan"	Dennis Donnelly	Stan Berkowitz	January 4, 1990	124
23	23	"Where's My Soup Cans?"	Charles Bail	Alan Moskowitz	January 9, 1990	117
24	24	"Millie"	Charles Bail	E. Nick Alexander	January 11, 1990	104
25	25	"Queen of Hearts"	Georg Fenady	Mann Rubin	January 20, 1990	109
26	26	"Housewife Hustler"	Georg Fenady	Larry Alexander, James J. Docherty	January 21, 1990	114

=== Season 2 (1990) ===
No. overall	No. in season	Title	Directed by	Written by	Original release date	Prod. code
27	1	"Parachute to Death"	Charles Bail	N/A	April 14, 1990	201
28	2	"The Despot"	Sidney Hayers	Pat Morrill, Dan Wetherbee	April 22, 1990	203
29	3	"Hired to Kill"	Sidney Hayers	Stan Berkowitz	April 28, 1990	204
30	4	"Chicken Hawk"	Charles Bail	Joseph Gunn	April 29, 1990	205
31	5	"Bombs Bursting in Air"	Charles Bail	Nancy Ann Miller	May 5, 1990	206
32	6	"Family Ordeal"	Charles Bail	B.W. Sandefur	May 19, 1990	209
33	7	"Little Chips"	Charles Bail	Elliott Anderson	May 20, 1990	210
34	8	"Brain Drain"	Georg Fenady	Phil Mishkin	May 26, 1990	211
35	9	"Trespass"	Georg Fenady	Nancy Ann Miller	June 2, 1990	212
36	10	"Nobody's Child"	Charles Bail	Stephen Glantz, Caliope Brattlestreet	June 3, 1990	213
37	11	"Conspiracy of Guns"	Charles Bail	Carlton Hollander, Dennis Rodriguez	June 9, 1990	202
38	12	"Twice a Hero"	Sidney Hayers	Steve Johnson	June 16, 1990	207
39	13	"Contract Killer"	Sidney Hayers	Stan Berkowitz	June 17, 1990	208
40	14	"Requiem"	Charles Bail	Elliott Anderson	June 23, 1990	214
41	15	"The Auditor"	Georg Fenady	Gregory S. Dinallo	June 24, 1990	215
42	16	"The Book"	Georg Fenady	Joseph Gunn	June 30, 1990	216
A visit to a high-class house of prostitution ultimately leads to the death of a county supervisor.
43	17	"Little Miss Nobody"	Georg Fenady	Joseph Gunn	August 4, 1990	217
An investigation into the death of a beautiful young prostitute leads to a prominent citizen and a drug dealer.
44	18	"Revenge"	Georg Fenady	Burton Armus	August 11, 1990	218
A man accused of child-molesting is found shot to death.
45	19	"Copy Cat"	Charles Bail	Pat Morrill, Dan Wetherbee	August 12, 1990	219
A homeless schizophrenic man confesses to a string of homosexual murders.
46	20	"Leg Up"	Charles Bail	Gregory S. Dinallo	August 18, 1990	220
The severed leg of a man who supposedly died in a plane crash in the Gulf of Mexico washes up on a beach near Los Angeles.
47	21	"Pretty Girl"	Sidney Hayers	Burton Armus	August 19, 1990	221
A bright-eyed young girl looking for a better life in the big city apparently commits suicide, but her parents are sure she has been murdered.
48	22	"The Torch"	Sidney Hayers	Carlton Hollander	August 25, 1990	222
49	23	"Death of a Prom Queen"	Charles Bail	Stephen Glantz, Caliope Brattlestreet	August 26, 1990	223
50	24	"Push"	Charles Bail	N/A	September 1, 1990	224
51	25	"Safe Job"	Sidney Hayers	Burton Armus	September 8, 1990	225
52	26	"Family Affair"	Sidney Hayers	Joseph Gunn	September 9, 1990	226
