= Genghis Khan (1965 film) =

1965 film by Henry Levin

- Theatrical poster by Frank McCarthy.
- Directed by: Henry Levin
- Screenplay by: Beverley Cross; Clarke Reynolds
- Story by: Berkely Mather
- Produced by: Irving Allen
- Starring: Stephen Boyd; James Mason; Eli Wallach; Françoise Dorléac; Telly Savalas; Robert Morley; Yvonne Mitchell; Omar Sharif
- Cinematography: Geoffrey Unsworth
- Edited by: Geoffrey Foot
- Music by: Dušan Radić
- Production companies: Irving Allen Productions; Central Cinema Company Film (CCC); Avala Film
- Distributed by: Columbia Pictures
- Release dates: April 15, 1965 (Germany); June 23, 1965 (United States); August 30, 1965 (United Kingdom)
- Running time: 120 minutes
- Countries: United Kingdom; Yugoslavia; West Germany
- Language: English
- Budget: $4.5 million
- Box office: $2.25 million (US & Canada rentals); 2.6 million tickets (France & West Germany)

Genghis Khan is a 1965 biographical adventure film directed by Henry Levin and starring Omar Sharif, depicting a fictionalized account of the life and conquests of the Mongol emperor Genghis Khan. Distributed in the United Kingdom and the United States in 1965 by Columbia Pictures, the film also features James Mason, Stephen Boyd, Eli Wallach, Françoise Dorléac and Telly Savalas.

A 70 mm version was released by CCC Film in West Germany. It was filmed in Yugoslavia with Technicolor and Panavision.

== Plot ==
The young Temujin sees his father tortured and killed by a rival Mongol tribe led by Jamuga. He is yoked with a wheel around his neck and tormented by children. He meets the beautiful Bortai, but is punished by Jamuga. Temujin escapes and hides in the hills, followed by holy man Geen and mute warrior Sengal, who pledge their allegiance to him. He vows to unite all the Mongol tribes. Temujin liberates Salkit prisoners from a group of Merkits, who they then slaughter and rob. The newly freed men join Temujin and unite with Temujin's Yesugei tribe.

Raids along caravan routes increase the size of his army, and Temujin decides to capture and take Bortai as his wife, and he succeeds. Jamuga finds Temujin's camp by following Bortai's brothers when they defect from Jamuga's tribe. Jamuga recaptures Bortai, and rapes her before Temujin is able to steal her back. Temujin subsequently raises the resulting child as his own. Temujin's army heads east in order to escape Jamuga.

Kam Ling, a stranded Chinese ambassador, is helped by Temujin, and he accompanies the diplomat into Song China, where he meets the Emperor. Despite being well fed, given elegant clothing and experiencing luxuries such as bathing, wine and the arts, Temujin, Geen and Bortai's brothers agree that they are prisoners. After the Mongols successfully defeat Manchurians led by Jamuga, Jamuga is taken prisoner; the Emperor proclaims Temujin to be "Genghis Khan, the Prince of Conquerors". Temujin's Mongol army stays in Beijing for a long period, training and learning. Although Jamuga has been captured, he refuses to let his Merkit tribe join Temujin's united Mongol tribes.

Temujin expresses to the Emperor his desire to take the Mongol tribes back to their homelands, but the Emperor refuses, revealing to his ambassador Kam Ling that he is worried that the Mongols will return to China as conquerors and so he must keep them inside China. The Emperor decides to assassinate Genghis Khan using Jamuga, because Jamuga is a Mongol and therefore would leave the Chinese people blameless. Kam Ling secretly discloses to Temujin and his group that the emperor fears the Mongols staying in China. He suggests the emperor is a subtle man and there is another solution, where his people stay and Temujin goes on a "very long journey, alone", implying the emperor wishes to assassinate Temujin. When Temujin inquires who might kill him, Kam Ling reveals that only a Merkit would be the assassin, which Temujin deduces is Jamuga. He orders Subodai and one of his brothers to bring Jamuga to him, but when they release Jamuga, he escapes. The Mongols break out of their captivity by tricking the Emperor to personally light the final fireworks display at the end of a festival. The resulting explosion blows up a gate in the city wall, killing the Emperor. The Mongols break out, taking the Emperor's daughter and Kam Ling with them and begin their legendary conquest of Asia. Temujin instructs Bortai's brothers Jebi, Subotai and Kassar to conquer China, Russia and India respectively.

After laying waste to everything from Manchuria to Moscow, the Mongol army prepares to face the Shah of Khwarezm. The escaped Jamuga flees to Khwarezm, where he convinces the Shah to ally his forces with Jamuga's Merkits. The Mongol army faces the Shah's army and the Merkits on a battlefield. Temujin sends the ambassador Kam Ling as an envoy to ask Jamuga one last time to ally with him, Jamuga responds by killing Kam Ling and dragging his body back to the Mongols; he will never ally himself with Genghis Khan. The Mongols, with the help of cannons from China, engage in battle with the Shah's army. The Shah orders a retreat and Jamuga responds by killing him. Jamuga orders the Merkits to stay and fight. They are easily defeated, but Jamuga challenges Temujin to a Mongol duel. Temujin fights Jamuga in a final battle and kills him, although he is gravely wounded. Temujin addresses the Merkits, who all bow down and join the Mongol tribes. Temujin announces that he has accomplished his dream of uniting the Mongol peoples. He succumbs to his wounds and dies soon after, following his loving farewell to Bortai and her two remaining brothers.

A voiceover speaks of Genghis Khan's reputation and successors in expanding his empire - his grandson Babur founded the Mughal Dynasty of India and Kublai Khan became Emperor of China.

== Cast ==
- Omar Sharif as Temujin, later Genghis Khan
- Stephen Boyd as Jamuga
- James Mason as Kam Ling, the Chinese Ambassador
- Eli Wallach as Shah of Khwarezm
- Françoise Dorléac as Bortei
- Telly Savalas as Shan
- Robert Morley as Emperor of China
- Michael Hordern as Geen
- Yvonne Mitchell as Katke
- Woody Strode as Sengal
- Kenneth Cope as Subotai
- Roger Croucher as Kassar
- Don Borisenko as Jebai
- Patrick Holt as Kuchiuk
- Susanne Hsiao as Chin Yu
- George Savalas as Toktoa
- Gustavo Rojo as Altan

== Production ==
The film was shot over 125 days. It was one of a series of epics made by Irving Allen, others including The Long Ships and Cromwell.

Allen and Euan Lloyd (who worked in publicity) wanted to make a follow-up called Clive of India based on a script by Terence Young, starring Stephen Boyd, but it was never made.

== Reception ==
=== Box office ===
In the United States and Canada, the film earned $2.25 million in distributor rentals.

In Europe, the film sold 1.724 million tickets in West Germany and 879,532 tickets in France, for a combined 2,603,532 tickets sold in West Germany and France.

== See also ==
- List of Asian historical drama films
