= George Savalas =

American actor (1924–1985)

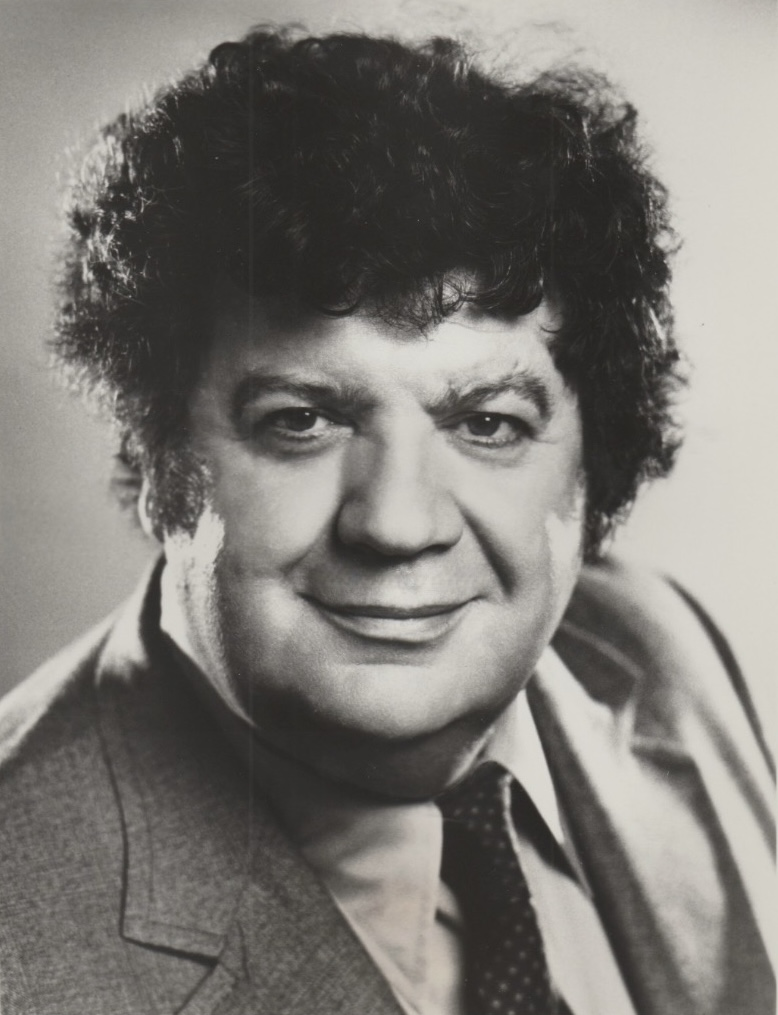
- Savalas in Kojak, 1976
- Born: Georgios Demosthenes Savalas; December 5, 1924; New York City, U.S.
- Died: October 2, 1985 (aged 60); Los Angeles, California, U.S.
- Occupation: Actor
- Years active: 1962–1985
- Spouse: Robin Abber (m. 1968)
- Children: 6
- Relatives: Telly Savalas (brother); Ariana Savalas (niece)

Georgios Demosthenes Savalas (/səˈvɑːləs, -ˈvæl-/ sə-VA(H)L-əs; Greek: Γεώργιος Δημοσθένης Σαβάλας; December 5, 1924 – October 2, 1985) was an American film and television actor. He was the younger brother of actor Telly Savalas, with whom he acted in the popular 1970s TV crime series Kojak.

== Early life ==
Born in The Bronx, New York City to immigrants from Greece, he was one of five children: brothers Aristotelis "Telly", Gus, and Ted; and sister Katherine. He attended Holy Cross Institute in Connecticut and Mineola High School (Long Island). He served in the Pacific War as a United States Navy gunner but also acted, produced and directed stage performances on military bases. He studied drama at Columbia University.

== Career ==
Starting out, Savalas worked many jobs, including driving a taxi and waiting tables. Although known primarily as a TV actor, Savalas was originally a stage actor and acting instructor. He taught at the Coliseum Studios for five years. He appeared in off-Broadway productions such as Death of a Salesman and Arms and Man while working with his father in two businesses: a hotel and a heating and air-conditioning company.

He is best known for his role as Detective Sergeant Demosthenes Stavros on the TV series Kojak, which starred his brother Telly. For the first two seasons, Savalas was credited as "Demosthenes" on screen so as not to create confusion between himself and his brother, although both men were easily distinguishable by sight (George having a full head of hair while Telly shaved his balding head and was noticeably thinner). George Savalas, under his real name, also received a Production Associate credit during the first season and a Production Assistant credit for the second season.

He appeared in several films such as The Slender Thread (1965), Genghis Khan (1965) and Kelly's Heroes (1970), — all of which also featured his brother Telly. In the mid-1970s, he appeared in adverts in the United Kingdom for the Wimpy Bar chain.

In his later years, George recorded songs in Greek and toured with his band, appearing at such venues as Carnegie Hall. He returned to the stage, appearing in a number of off-Broadway productions before illness forced him to retire.

== Personal life ==
Savalas had six children: sons Nicholas George, Leonidas George, and Constantine George with his first wife; and sons Gregory George and Matthew George, and daughter Militza with his second wife Robin. Later in life, he lived in the Reseda neighborhood of Los Angeles. He died of leukemia, aged 60, in Los Angeles.

Savalas and his brother Telly were Freemasons.

== Filmography ==
=== Film ===
Year	Title	Role	Notes
1964	Good Neighbor Sam	Truck Driver	Uncredited
1965	Genghis Khan	Toktoa	
1965	The Slender Thread	Pool Player	
1968	Rosemary's Baby	Workman	Uncredited
1969	A Dream of Kings	Apollo	
1970	Kelly's Heroes	First Sergeant Mulligan	
1970	Violent City	Shapiro	Uncredited
1973	The Outfit	Kenilworth Finance Employee	Uncredited
1976	Kravges ston anemo	Man in Pool	
1982	Fake-Out	The Pit Boss	

=== Television ===
Year	Title	Role	Notes
1961	The Dick Powell Show	Reveller at party	Episode: "Three Soldiers"
1962	GE True	Lukas - Grocer	Episode: "V-Victor 5"
1963	The Dakotas	Pope, Bartender	Episode: "A Nice Girl from Goliath"
1963	The Virginian	Turnkey	Episode: "Ride a Dark Trail"
1963	Ripcord	Member of Search Party	Episode: "Run, Joby, Run"
1964	Combat!	Cooper	Episode: "Counter-Punch"
1964	The Rogues	Lobo	Episode: "Viva Diaz!"
1965	Dr. Kildare	Aristos	Episode: "With Hellfire and Thunder"
1966	The Fugitive	Prisoner	Episode: "Stroke of Genius"
1966	Daniel Boone	The Warden	Episode: "The Accused"
1967	The Man from U.N.C.L.E.	Greek Merchant	Episode: "The Test Tube Killer Affair"
1968	Mannix	Sergeant	Episode: "The End of the Rainbow"
1971	All in the Family	Joe Frouge	Episode: "Success Story"
1973	The Marcus-Nelson Murders	Jack Deems	Television film
1973–1978	Kojak	Det. Stavros / Sgt. Stavros / Det. Stravros	114 episodes
1975	Kolchak: The Night Stalker	Kaz	Episode: "The Youth Killer"
1976	Whodunnit?	Panellist	Episode: "Dead Grass"
1979	Alice	Himself	Episode: "Has Anyone Here Seen Telly?"
1985	Kojak: The Belarus File	Stavros	Television film
1985	Alice in Wonderland	The Courtier	TV mini-series; final on screen appearance
