= List of The ABC Mystery Movie episodes =

The 1970s anthology television series The NBC Mystery Movie was revived in 1989 by Universal Television and the ABC television network, retitled as the ABC Monday Mystery Movie. It featured the return of the original Mystery Movie series Columbo, joined by two new series: Gideon Oliver, and B.L. Stryker.

In its second and final season, it became the ABC Saturday Mystery Movie, with Columbo, B.L. Stryker, a new series Christine Cromwell, and a revival of the 1970s crime drama Kojak.

== ABC Monday Mystery Movie (1989) ==
Series title	Episode title	Original air date
Columbo	"Columbo Goes to the Guillotine"	February 6, 1989
B.L. Stryker	"The Dancer's Touch"	February 13, 1989
Gideon Oliver	"Sleep Well, Professor Oliver"	February 20, 1989
Columbo	"Murder, Smoke and Shadows"	February 27, 1989
B.L. Stryker	"Caolann"	March 6, 1989
Gideon Oliver	"Tongs"	March 13, 1989
B.L. Stryker	"Blind Chess"	March 27, 1989
Columbo	"Sex and the Married Detective"	April 3, 1989
Gideon Oliver	"The Last Plane from Coramayo"	April 10, 1989
B.L. Stryker	"Auntie Sue"	April 17, 1989
Gideon Oliver	"By the Rivers of Babylon"	April 24, 1989
Columbo	"Grand Deceptions"	May 1, 1989
B.L. Stryker	"Blues for Buder"	May 15, 1989
Gideon Oliver	"Kennonite"	May 22, 1989

== ABC Saturday Mystery Movie (1989-90) ==
Series title	Episode title	Original air date
Kojak	"Kojak: Ariana"	November 4, 1989
Christine Cromwell	"Things That Go Bump in the Night"	November 11, 1989
B.L. Stryker	"The King of Jazz"	November 18, 1989
Columbo	"Murder, a Self Portrait"	November 25, 1989
Kojak	"Kojak: Fatal Flaw"	December 2, 1989
Christine Cromwell	"Easy Come, Easy Go"	December 9, 1989
B.L. Stryker	"Die Laughing"	December 16, 1989
Kojak	"Kojak: Flowers for Matty"	January 6, 1990
B.L. Stryker	"Winner Takes All"	January 13, 1990
Columbo	"Columbo Cries Wolf"	January 20, 1990
Christine Cromwell	"In Vito Veritas"	January 27, 1990
Kojak	"Kojak: It's Always Something"	February 3, 1990
Columbo	"Agenda for Murder"	February 10, 1990
Christine Cromwell	"Only the Good Die Young"	February 17, 1990
B.L. Stryker	"Grand Theft Hotel"	February 24, 1990
B.L. Stryker	"High Rise"	March 10, 1990
Columbo	"Rest in Peace, Mrs. Columbo"	March 31, 1990
Kojak	"Kojak: None So Blind"	April 7, 1990
B.L. Stryker	"Plates"	April 14, 1990
Columbo	"Uneasy Lies the Crown"	April 28, 1990
B.L. Stryker	"Night Train"	May 5, 1990
