= Mark Russell (actor) =

American film and television actor

- Born: 1929 (age 96–97); Brooklyn, New York, U.S.
- Occupations: Film and television actor
- Years active: 1959–1985
- Spouse: Evellyn Myers (died.)
- Children: 5

Mark Russell (born 1929) is an American former film and television actor. He is best known for playing Detective Saperstein in the American crime drama television series Kojak.

== Life and career ==
Russell was born in Brooklyn, New York. He served in the United States Army. He began his screen career in 1959, appearing in the NBC western television series Bonanza. In the same year, he appeared in the ABC western television series Black Saddle.

Later in his career, Russell guest-starred in numerous television programs including The Fugitive, 12 O'Clock High, The Time Tunnel, Batman, Hogan's Heroes, Adam-12, Mission: Impossible, Land of the Giants, Ironside, Star Trek: The Original Series, Emergency!, Quincy, M.E., The Odd Couple and Mannix. He was originally a stand-in for actor Telly Savalas, who played the main role of Lieutenant Theo Kojak. His character, Detective Saperstein, was then created, and he won the role, starring in the television series from 1973 to 1978. He also appeared in numerous films such as The Errand Boy, Hangup, Captain Newman, M.D., Viva Las Vegas, Not with My Wife, You Don't, The Comic, Girl Happy, How to Succeed in Business Without Really Trying, Youngblood Hawke, The Notorious Landlady, Blume in Love, How to Murder Your Wife, Get to Know Your Rabbit, Warning Shot and Moving Violation.

Russell retired from acting in 1985, last appearing in the television film Kojak: The Belarus File.

== Personal life ==
Russell was married to Evellyn Myers. Their marriage ended until her death, and they had five children.
