= Border Cop =

1979 film starring Telly Savalas

- DVD cover for 'Border Cop'
- Directed by: Christopher Leitch
- Written by: Michael Allin
- Produced by: Donald Langdon
- Starring: Telly Savalas; Michael V. Gazzo; Mary McCusker; Danny De La Paz; Cecilia Camacho; Robin Clarke; Eddie Albert
- Cinematography: Gabriel Figuroa
- Edited by: Charles Tetoni
- Music by: Stanley Myers
- Production company: Connaught International
- Distributed by: Hemdale
- Release date: 1980
- Running time: 86 minutes
- Country: United Kingdom
- Language: English

Border Cop (also known as The Border) is a 1980 crime action film directed by Christopher Leitch and starring Telly Savalas. Savalas plays a United States Border Patrol agent who has a close run-in with a dangerous organized crime boss.

The film's tagline was Where the law crosses the line.

== Cast ==
- Telly Savalas - Frank Cooper
- Danny De La Paz - Benny Romero
- Eddie Albert - Moffat
- Michael V. Gazzo - Chico Suarez
- Cecilia Camacho - Leina Romero
- Robin Clarke - Officer Eddie Hale
- Mary McCusker - Hippie Lady Personnel

== Production ==
The Border was the first feature film from British production company Connaught International Limited. Producer Donald Langdon was one of three of the company's directors. The film was distributed in the United Kingdom by Hemdale, whose John Daly served as executive producer.
