= Dan Frazer =

American actor (1921-2011)

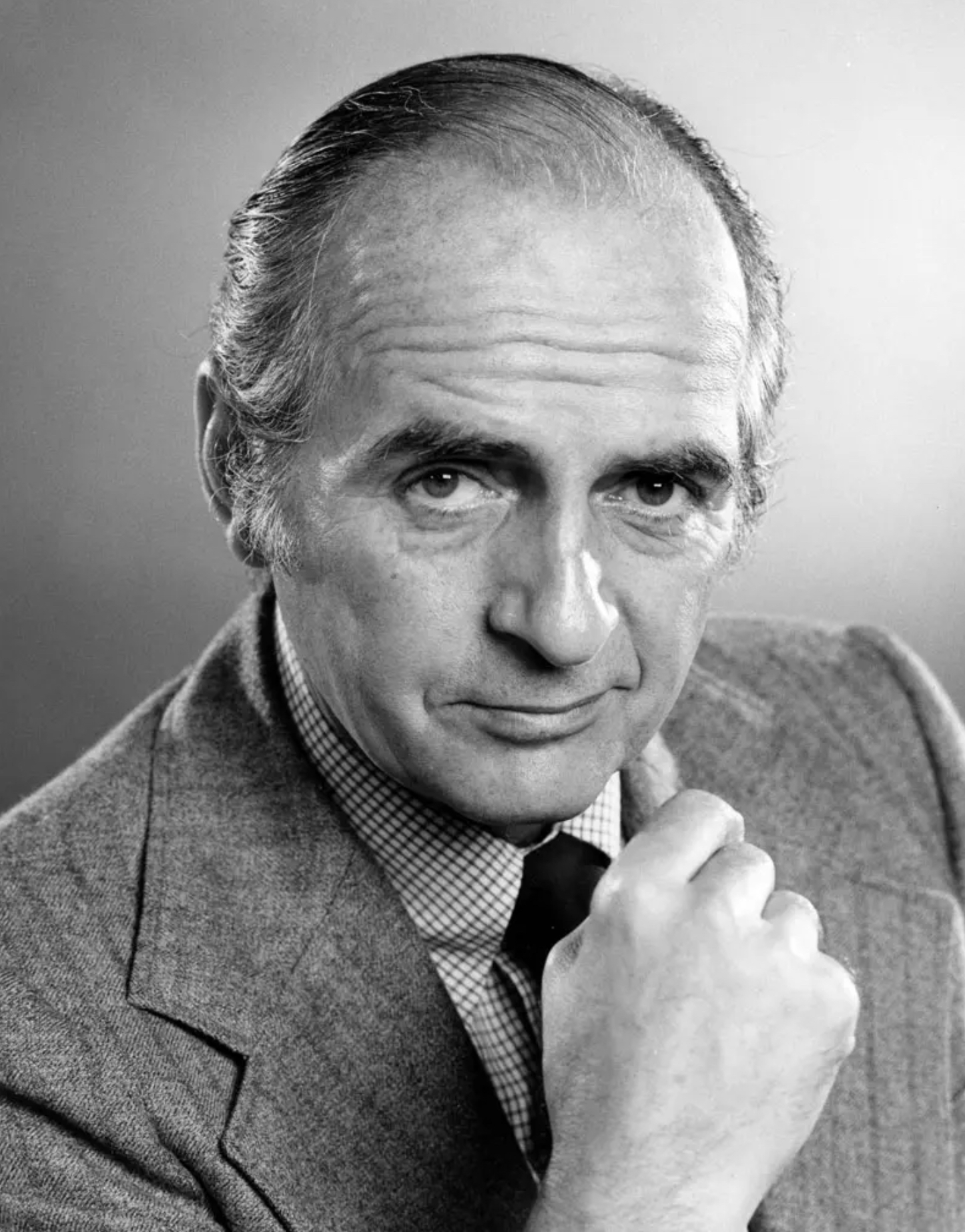
- Frazer in Kojak, 1976
- Born: Daniel Thomas Frazer; November 20, 1921; New York City, U.S.
- Died: December 16, 2011 (aged 90); New York City, U.S.
- Occupation: Actor
- Years active: 1949–2011
- Spouse: Lillian Lee Bogsett (m. 1943; died 1999)
- Children: 1

Daniel Thomas Frazer (November 20, 1921 – December 16, 2011) was an American actor. He was probably best known for his role as Captain Frank McNeil, the former partner turned supervisor of Theo Kojak, Telly Savalas's character, in the 1970s TV police drama Kojak.

== Biography ==
Born in a West Side neighborhood (formerly known as Hell's Kitchen) of Manhattan in New York City. Frazer served in the Special Services division of the United States Army during World War II, where he got exposure to theatrical writing and directing.

His screen career started in 1950.

His TV appearances include The Phil Silvers Show, Car 54, Where Are You?, The Untouchables, Route 66, Blue Light, The F.B.I., Barney Miller, The Eddie Capra Mysteries, and Law & Order. His first film role was in 1963's Lilies of the Field, playing Father Murphy. In his later years, Frazer appeared as detective Dan McCloskey on the daytime soap As the World Turns.

== Death ==
Frazer died of cardiac arrest on December 16, 2011, at his home in Manhattan.

== Filmography ==
- The Many Loves of Dobie Gillis (1960) - Henry R. Starbuck
- The Andy Griffith Show (1961) - Mr. Harmon
- Lilies of the Field (1963) - Father Murphy
- Route 66 (1964) - Bob Richards
- Lord Love a Duck (1966) - Honest Joe
- Counterpoint (1967) - Chaminant
- Take the Money and Run (1969) - Julius Epstein - The Psychiatrist
- ...tick...tick...tick... (1970) - Ira Jackson
- Bananas (1971) - Priest
- Fuzz (1972) - Lt. Amos Byrnes
- The Stoolie (1972) - Police Sgt. Alex Brogan
- Kojak (1973-1978, TV Series) - Capt. Frank McNeil / Chief of Detectives (117 episodes)
- Cleopatra Jones (1973) - Crawford
- The Super Cops (1974) - Police Capt. Irving Krasna
- Breakout (1975) - U.S. Customs Agent (uncredited)
- The Waltons (1981 episode "The Move") - Col. Henry Brunson (Cindy Walton's father)
- Kojak: The Belarus File (1985, TV Movie) - Chief of Detectives Frank McNeil
- As the World Turns (1986–1996, TV Series) - Lt. McCloskey
- Saying Kaddish (1991) - Uncle Manny
- Flodders in America (1992) - President
- Deconstructing Harry (1997) - Janet's Dad
- The Kings of Brooklyn (2004) - Leo
- Fireflies (2006) - Jack
- The Pack (2009) - Sol Epstein (final film role)
