= Telly Savalas =

American actor (1922–1994)

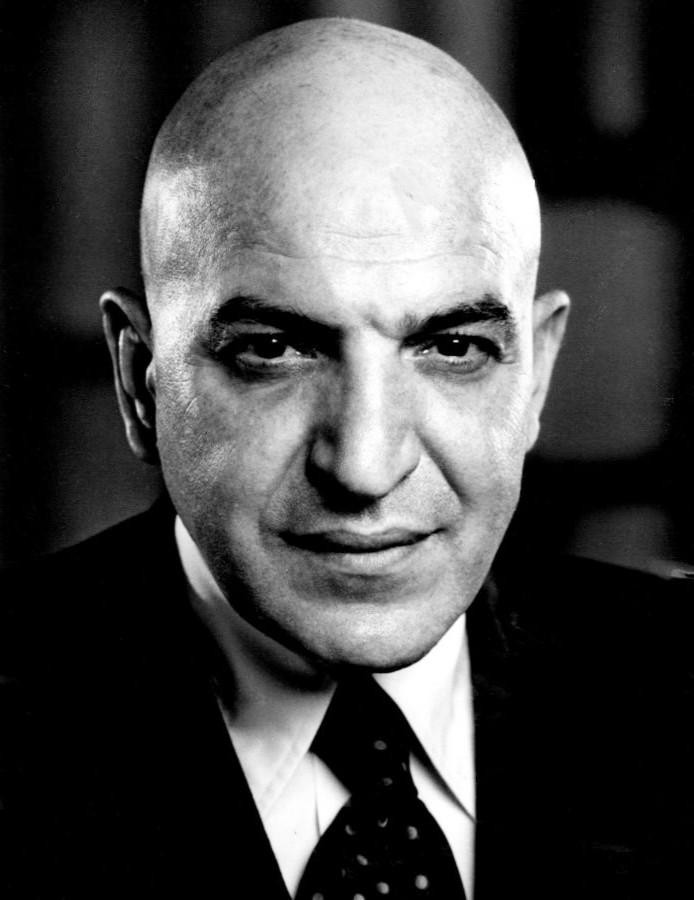
- Savalas in 1973
- Born: Aristotelis Savalas; January 21, 1922; Garden City, New York, U.S.
- Died: January 22, 1994 (aged 72); Los Angeles, California, U.S.
- Resting place: Forest Lawn Memorial Park, California, U.S.
- Education: Columbia University (BA)
- Occupations: Actor; singer
- Years active: 1950–1994
- Spouses: Katherine Nicolaides (m. 1948; div. 1957) Marilyn Gardner (m. 1960; div. 1974) Julie Hovland (m. 1984)
- Children: 6, including Ariana
- Relatives: George Savalas (brother)
- Military career
- Allegiance: United States
- Branch: United States Army
Further information
Service years	1941–1943
Rank	Corporal
Units	4th Medical Training Regiment
Conflicts	World War II
Awards	Purple Heart; American Defense Service Medal; American Campaign Medal; European–African–Middle Eastern Campaign Medal; World War II Victory Medal
- Website: tellysavalas.com

Aristotelis "Telly" Savalas (/səˈvɑːləs, -ˈvæl-/ sə-VA(H)L-əs; Greek: Αριστοτέλης Σαβάλας; January 21, 1922 – January 22, 1994) was an American actor. Noted for his bald head and deep, resonant voice, he is perhaps best known for portraying Lt. Theo Kojak on the crime drama series Kojak (1973–1978) and James Bond archvillain Ernst Stavro Blofeld in the film On Her Majesty's Secret Service (1969).

Savalas's other films include Birdman of Alcatraz (1962), The Greatest Story Ever Told (1965), Genghis Khan (1965), Battle of the Bulge (1965), The Dirty Dozen (1967), Kelly's Heroes (1970), Horror Express (1972), Lisa and the Devil (1974), Escape to Athena (1979), Border Cop (1980) and Mind Twister (1993). For Birdman of Alcatraz, he was nominated for the Academy Award for Best Supporting Actor and the Golden Globe Award for Best Supporting Actor.

Savalas released a cover of the Bread song "If", which became a UK number-one single in 1975.

== Early life ==
Aristotelis Savalas was born on January 21, 1922, in Garden City, New York, on Long Island. He is the second of five children born to Greek parents Christina (née Kapsalis), an artist who was a native of Sparta, and Nick Savalas, a restaurant owner. His paternal grandparents came from Ierakas. Savalas and his brother, Gus, sold newspapers and polished shoes to help support the family.

Savalas initially spoke only Greek when he entered grade school, but later learned English. He attended Cobbett Junior High School in Lynn, Massachusetts. He won a spelling bee there in 1934. Due to an oversight, he did not receive his prize until 1991, when the school principal and the Boston Herald awarded it to him.

Savalas graduated from Sewanhaka High School in Floral Park, New York, in 1940. A renowned swimmer, he worked as a beach lifeguard after graduation from high school. On one occasion he was unsuccessful in saving a father from drowning. As he attempted resuscitation, the man's two children stood nearby crying for their father to wake up. This affected Savalas so much that he spent the rest of his life promoting water safety, and later made all six of his children take swimming lessons.

=== Military service ===
In 1941, Savalas was drafted into the United States Army. Savalas served in Company C, 12th Medical Training Battalion, 4th Medical Training Regiment at Camp Pickett, Virginia, from 1941 to 1943. He was discharged from the Army with the rank of corporal in 1943 after being severely injured in a car accident. Savalas spent more than a year recuperating in a hospital with a broken pelvis, sprained ankle and concussion. He then attended the Armed Forces Institute, where he studied radio and television production.

In 1946, Savalas received a bachelor's degree in psychology from Columbia's School of General Studies, and started working on a master's degree while preparing for medical school.

== Career ==
=== Early roles ===
After the war, he worked for the U.S. State Department as host of the Your Voice of America series, then at ABC News. In 1950, Savalas hosted a radio show called The Coffeehouse in New York City.

Savalas began as an executive director and then as senior director of the news special events at ABC. He then became an executive producer for the Gillette Cavalcade of Sports, where he gave Howard Cosell his first job in television. Before his acting career took off, Savalas directed Scott Vincent and Cosell in Report to New York, WABC-TV's first regularly scheduled news program in fall 1959.

Savalas did not consider acting as a career until asked if he could recommend an actor who could do a European accent. He did, but as the friend in question could not go, Savalas himself went to cover for his friend and ended up being cast on "And Bring Home a Baby", an episode of Armstrong Circle Theatre in January 1958. He appeared on two more episodes of the series in 1959 and 1960, one, acting alongside a young Sydney Pollack. He was also in a version of The Iceman Cometh.

He quickly became much in demand as a guest star on TV shows, appearing in Sunday Showcase, Diagnosis: Unknown, Dow Hour of Great Mysteries (an adaptation of The Cat and the Canary), Naked City (alongside Claude Rains), The Witness (playing Lucky Luciano in one episode and Al Capone in another), The United States Steel Hour, and The Aquanauts. He was a regular on the short-lived NBC series Acapulco (1961) with Ralph Taeger and James Coburn.

Savalas made his film debut in Mad Dog Coll (1961), playing a cop. His work had impressed fellow actor Burt Lancaster, who arranged for Savalas to be cast in the John Frankenheimer-directed The Young Savages, also in 1961 and again playing a cop. Pollack worked on the film as an acting coach.

In 1962, in one of his most acclaimed performances, Savalas reunited with Lancaster and Frankenheimer for Birdman of Alcatraz, where he was nominated for the Academy Award and Golden Globe for Best Supporting Actor. The same year, he appeared as a private detective in Cape Fear (directed by J. Lee Thompson with whom Savalas would work in future films), and The Interns, reprising his role from the latter film in The New Interns (1964).

In the 1960s, Savalas also guest-starred in a number of TV series including The New Breed, The Detectives, Ben Casey, The Twilight Zone (the episode "Living Doll"), The Fugitive, and Arrest and Trial among others.

=== Stardom ===
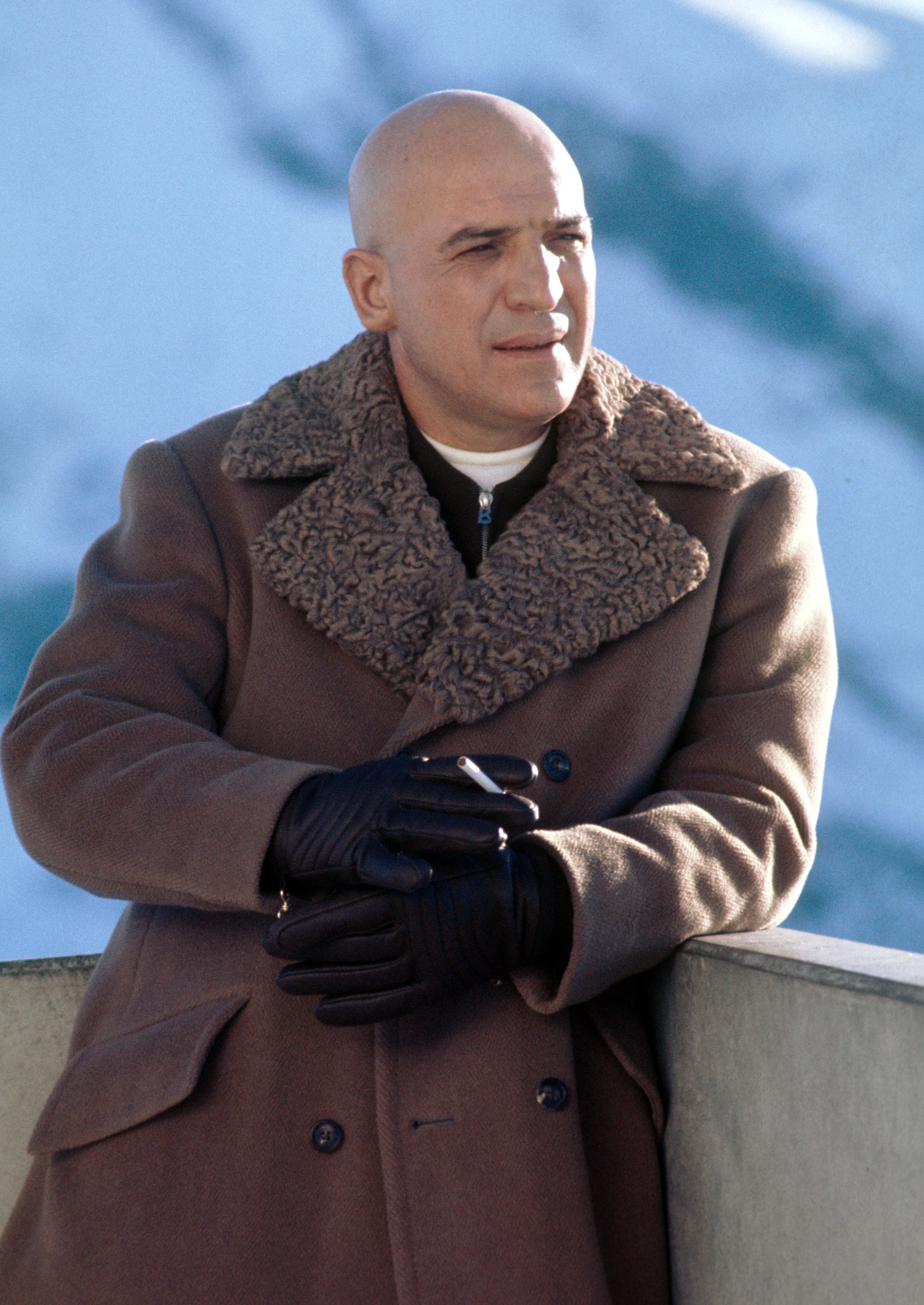
On the set of On Her Majesty's Secret Service at Piz Gloria, Switzerland (1968)

In 1963, he continued in supporting roles in films such as The Man from the Diners' Club, Love Is a Ball, and Johnny Cool. Already at a late stage of male pattern baldness, he shaved his head to play Pontius Pilate in The Greatest Story Ever Told (1965) and kept it that way for the rest of his life. He reunited with J. Lee Thompson in John Goldfarb, Please Come Home! (1965), and was one of many names in Genghis Khan (also 1965).

In 1967, he was part of an all-star cast in The Dirty Dozen, playing Archer Maggott (the worst of the dozen), in a role Jack Palance turned down. He reunited with Burt Lancaster and Sydney Pollack in the Western The Scalphunters (1968), and also featured in the comedy Buona Sera, Mrs. Campbell (also 1968)—noted as one of his favorite roles—and the all-star action movie Mackenna's Gold (1969), his third film for J. Lee Thompson. Savalas attributed his success to "his complete ability to be himself."

Savalas's first leading role in film was in the British crime comedy Crooks and Coronets (1969). The same year, he appeared in the James Bond movie On Her Majesty's Secret Service, playing Ernst Stavro Blofeld. He continued to appear in films during the 1970s including Kelly's Heroes (1970) (with Clint Eastwood); Clay Pigeon (1971); and several European features such as Violent City (1970) (with Charles Bronson); A Town Called Bastard (1971); Horror Express (with Peter Cushing and Christopher Lee); A Reason to Live, a Reason to Die; the title role in Pancho Villa (all 1972); and Redneck (1973). He reunited with Christopher Lee in the 1976 thriller Killer Force, and also appeared in Peter Hyams' Capricorn One (1978).

"I had worked my way up to star billing", he later said, "when the bottom dropped out of the movie business. I could have stayed in Europe and made Italian movies, but I discovered the big difference between an Italian and American movie is that in the American movie, you get paid."

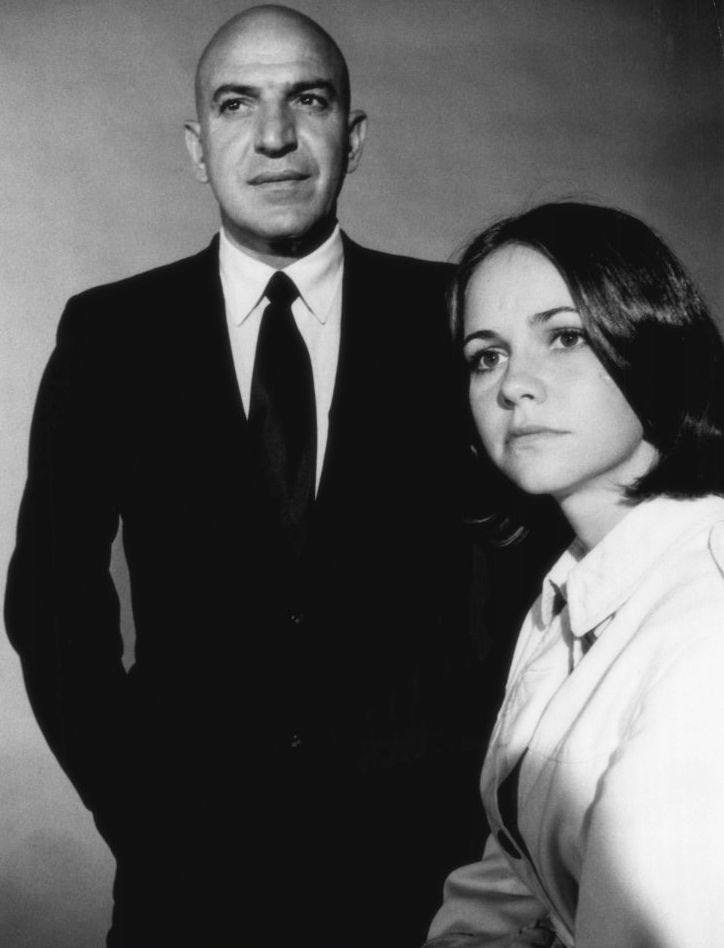
Savalas and Sally Field in Mongo's Back in Town (1971)

=== Kojak ===
Savalas first played Lt. Theophilus "Theo" Kojak in the TV movie The Marcus–Nelson Murders (CBS, 1973), which was based on the real-life Career Girls murder case.

Kojak was a bald New York City detective with a fondness for lollipops and whose tagline was "Who loves ya, baby?". He also liked to say, "Everybody should have a little Greek in them." Although the lollipop gimmick was added to indulge his sweet tooth, Savalas also smoked heavily onscreen—cigarettes, cigarillos, and cigars—throughout the first season's episodes (and still did afterward, despite this). The lollipops had given him three cavities, and were part of an unsuccessful effort by Kojak and Savalas himself to curb his smoking. Critic Clive James explained the lead actor's appeal as Kojak: "Telly Savalas can make bad slang sound like good slang and good slang sound like lyric poetry. It isn't what he is, so much as the way he talks, that gets you tuning in."

David Shipman later wrote: "Kojak was sympathetic to outcasts and ruthless with social predators. The show maintained a high quality to the end, mixing tension with some laughs and always anxious to tackle civic issues, one of its raisons d'etre in the first place. It was required viewing in Britain every Saturday evening for eight years. To almost everyone everywhere, Kojak means Savalas and vice versa, but to Savalas himself, the series was merely an interval, albeit a long one, in a distinguished career."

Kojak aired on CBS for five seasons from October 24, 1973, until March 18, 1978, with 118 episodes produced. The role won Savalas an Emmy and two Golden Globes for Best Actor in a Drama Series. Co-stars on the show included Savalas's younger brother George as Detective Stavros, a sensitive, wild-haired, quiet, comedic foil to Kojak's street-wise humor in an otherwise dark dramatic series, Kevin Dobson as Kojak's trusted young partner, Det. Bobby Crocker, whose on-screen chemistry with Savalas was a success story of 1970s television, and Dan Frazer as Captain Frank McNeil.

Due to a decline in ratings, the series was cancelled by CBS in 1978. Savalas and Frazer were the only actors to appear in all 118 episodes. Savalas was unhappy about the show's demise but got the chance to reprise the Kojak persona in several television movies, starting in 1985. The first film, subtitled The Belarus File and broadcast in February 1985, reunited Savalas with several of his co-stars from the series: younger brother George, Dan Frazer, Mark Russell (Det. Saperstein) and Vince Conti (Det. Rizzo). This marked those actors' final appearances in the Kojak franchise.

A further six Kojak TV movies were produced, titled The Price of Justice (1987), Ariana, Fatal Flaw (both 1989), Flowers for Matty, It's Always Something—with Kevin Dobson reprising his role of Bobby Crocker, now an assistant district attorney—and None So Blind (all 1990).

=== Later work ===
Savalas wrote, directed, and starred in the 1977 independent thriller Beyond Reason, but the film was not released in cinemas; it was made available only on home media in 1985. Savalas was part of an all-star cast in the movies Escape to Athena, Beyond the Poseidon Adventure (both 1979), and Cannonball Run II (1984), and continued to appear in a number of film and television guest roles during the 1980s, including Border Cop (1980) and Faceless (1988), the series Tales of the Unexpected (1981), and two episodes each of The Love Boat (1985) and The Equalizer (1987); the latter series was produced by James McAdams, who had also produced Kojak.

Savalas was the lead actor in the TV movie Hellinger's Law (1981), which was originally planned as a pilot for a series, but ultimately never materialized.

In 1992, he appeared in three episodes of the TV series The Commish (his son-in-law was one of the producers). This was Savalas's final television role. He appeared in two further feature films before his death, Mind Twister (1993) and the posthumous release Backfire! (1995).

=== Other achievements ===
With the $1,000,000 he was paid for On Her Majesty's Secret Service in 1969, Savalas bought The Bridge House, in Ferndown, Dorset, England. A couple of relatives ran it for him as a hotel.

As a singer, Savalas had some chart success. His spoken word version of Bread's "If", produced by Snuff Garrett, reached number one in both the UK and Ireland in March 1975, but just number 88 in Canada, and his follow-up, a version of "You've Lost That Lovin' Feelin'" peaked at No. 47 in the UK. In February 1981, his version of Don Williams' "Some Broken Hearts Never Mend" topped the charts in Switzerland. He worked with composer and producer John Cacavas on many albums, including Telly (1974) (which peaked at No. 12 in the UK and No. 49 in Australia) and Who Loves Ya, Baby (1976).

In the late 1970s, Savalas narrated three UK travelogues titled Telly Savalas Looks at Portsmouth, Telly Savalas Looks at Aberdeen, and Telly Savalas Looks at Birmingham. They were produced by Harold Baim and were examples of quota quickies, which were then part of a requirement that cinemas in the United Kingdom show a set percentage of British-produced films. In the 1980s and early 1990s, Savalas appeared in commercials for the Players' Club Gold Card. In 1982, along with Bob Hope and Linda Evans, he participated in the "world premiere" television ad introducing Diet Coke to Americans. On October 28, 1987, Savalas hosted Return to the Titanic Live, a two-hour television special broadcast from Cité des Sciences et de l'Industrie in Paris, which was widely criticized as being insensitive and for making light of the tragic sinking soon after its wreck was discovered. He also hosted the 1989 video UFOs and Channeling.

He received a star on the Hollywood Walk of Fame in 1983. In 1999, TV Guide ranked him number 18 on its 50 Greatest TV Stars of All Time list.

== Personal life ==
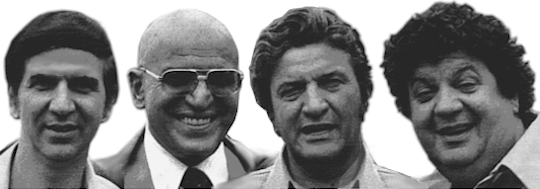
The Savalas brothers (l-r): Teddy, Telly, Gus, and George

Savalas was married three times. In 1948, after his father's death from bladder cancer, Savalas married his college sweetheart, Katherine Nicolaides. Their daughter Christina, named after his mother, was born in 1950. In 1957, Katherine filed for divorce. She urged him to move back to his mother's house during that same year.

While Savalas was going broke, he founded the Garden City Theater Center in his native Garden City. While working there, he met Marilyn Gardner, a theater teacher. They married in 1960. Marilyn gave birth to their daughter, Penelope, in 1961. A second daughter, Candace, was born in 1963. They divorced in 1974, after a long separation.

In January 1969, while working on the movie On Her Majesty's Secret Service, Savalas met Sally Adams (billed as Dani Sheridan, one of Blofeld's "Angels of Death"), an actress 24 years his junior, whose daughter from a previous relationship is Nicollette Sheridan. Savalas later moved in with Sally, who gave birth to their son Nicholas Savalas on February 24, 1973. Although Savalas and Sally Adams never legally married, she went by the name Sally Savalas. They stopped living together in December 1978. She filed a palimony lawsuit against him in 1980, demanding support for herself, their son, and for Nicollette.

In 1977, during the last season of Kojak, Savalas met Julie Hovland, a travel agent from Minnesota. They were married from 1984 until his death and had two children: Christian, an entrepreneur, singer, and songwriter, and Ariana, an actress and singer/songwriter. Savalas was close friends with actor John Aniston, and was godfather to his daughter Jennifer, a successful TV and film actress.

Savalas held a degree in psychology and was a world-class poker player who finished 21st at the main event in the 1992 World Series of Poker. He was also a motorcycle racer and lifeguard. His other hobbies and interests included golfing, swimming, reading romantic books, watching football, travelling, collecting luxury cars and gambling. He loved horse racing and bought a racehorse with film director and producer Howard W. Koch. Naming the horse Telly's Pop, it won several races in 1975, including the Norfolk Stakes and Del Mar Futurity.

In his capacity as producer for Kojak, he gave many stars their first break, as Burt Lancaster had done for him. He was also a strong contributor to his Greek Orthodox roots through the Saint Sophia and Saint Nicholas cathedrals in Los Angeles and was the sponsor of bringing electricity in the 1970s to his ancestral home, Ierakas.

Savalas had a minor physical handicap in that his left index finger was deformed. This deformed digit was often indicated on screen; the Kojak episode "Conspiracy of Fear" in which a close-up of Savalas holding his chin in his hand clearly shows the permanently bent finger.

As a philanthropist and philhellene, Savalas supported many Hellenic causes and made friends in major cities around the world. In Chicago, he often met with Illinois state senators Steven G. Nash and Samuel C. Maragos.

In 1993, Savalas appeared on an Australian TV show, The Extraordinary, with a paranormal tale about a hitchhiking mystery that he could not explain.

Along with his brother, Savalas was a Freemason.

In the 1980s, Savalas began to lose close relatives. His brother George Savalas, who played Stavros in the original series, died in 1985 of leukemia at age 60. His mother died in 1988. In late 1989, Savalas was diagnosed with transitional-cell cancer of the bladder.

== Death ==
Savalas died on January 22, 1994, of complications of prostate and bladder cancer, at the Sheraton-Universal Hotel in Los Angeles, the day after his 72nd birthday. He had lived at the Sheraton in Universal City for 20 years, becoming such a fixture at the hotel bar that it was renamed Telly's.

Savalas was interred at the George Washington section of Forest Lawn, Hollywood Hills Cemetery in Los Angeles, California. The funeral, held in the Saint Sophia Greek Orthodox Church, was attended by his third wife, Julie, and his brother Gus. His first two wives, Katherine and Marilyn, also attended with their own children. The mourners included Angie Dickinson, Jennifer Aniston, Kevin Sorbo, Frank Sinatra, Don Rickles, and several of Savalas's Kojak co-stars including Kevin Dobson and Dan Frazer.

== Filmography ==
=== Film ===
Year	Title	Role	Notes
1961	Mad Dog Coll	Lieutenant Darro	
1961	The Young Savages	Lieutenant Gunderson	
1961	The Sin of Jesus	Felix	Short subject
1962	Cape Fear	Private Detective Charles Sievers	
1962	Birdman of Alcatraz	Feto Gomez	Nominated—Academy Award for Best Supporting Actor; Nominated—Golden Globe Award for Best Supporting Actor – Motion Picture
1962	The Interns	Dr. Dominic Riccio	
1963	The Man from the Diners' Club	'Foots' Pulardos	
1963	Love Is a Ball	Dr. Christian Gump (Millie's uncle)	
1963	Johnny Cool	Vincenzo 'Vince' Santangelo	
1964	The New Interns	Dr. Dominick 'Dom' Riccio	
1965	The Greatest Story Ever Told	Pontius Pilate	
1965	John Goldfarb, Please Come Home!	Macmuid (Harem Recruiter)	Uncredited
1965	Genghis Khan	Shan	
1965	Battle of the Bulge	Sergeant Guffy	Nominated—Golden Globe Award for Best Supporting Actor – Motion Picture
1965	The Slender Thread	Dr. Joe Coburn	
1966	Beau Geste	Sergeant Major Dagineau	
1967	The Dirty Dozen	Archer Maggott	
1968	Sol Madrid	Emil Dietrich	
1968	The Scalphunters	Jim Howie	
1968	Buona Sera, Mrs. Campbell	Walter Braddock	
1969	The Assassination Bureau	Lord Bostwick	
1969	Mackenna's Gold	Sergeant Tibbs	
1969	Sophie's Place	Herbie Haseler	Known as Crooks and Coronets in the United Kingdom
1969	On Her Majesty's Secret Service	Ernst Stavro Blofeld	
1970	Land Raiders	Vicente Cardenas	
1970	Kelly's Heroes	Joe 'Big Joe'	
1970	Violent City	Al Weber	
1971	Pretty Maids All in a Row	Surcher	
1971	A Town Called Bastard	Don Carlos	
1971	Clay Pigeon	Redford	
1972	Crime Boss	Don Vincenzo	
1972	Sonny and Jed	Sheriff Franciscus	
1972	Horror Express	Captain Kazan	
1972	The Killer Is on the Phone	Ranko Drasovic	
1972	Pancho Villa	Pancho Villa	
1972	A Reason to Live, a Reason to Die	Maggiore Ward	
1973	Senza Ragione	'Memphis'	
1974	Lisa and the Devil	Leandro	
1975	Inside Out	Harry Morgan	
1976	Killer Force	Harry Webb	
1978	Capricorn One	Albain	
1979	Escape to Athena	Zeno	
1979	Beyond the Poseidon Adventure	Captain Stefan Svevo	
1979	The Muppet Movie	El Sleezo Tough	
1980	Border Cop	Frank Cooper	
1981	Maria Tomba Homem	Unknown	Mazzaropi, had as objective, to make the next film, with the actor, perhaps with the title KOJECA (parody of the name of the series Kojak), but he died before even starting the pre-production of the film, on June 13, 1981.
1982	Fake-Out	Lieutenant Thurston	
1983	Afghanistan pourquoi?	Rebel Leader	
1984	Cannonball Run II	Hymie Kaplan	
1985	Beyond Reason	Dr. Nicholas Mati	Originally filmed in 1977 and not released theatrically; made available on home video eight years later Also director and writer
1986	GoBots: Battle of the Rock Lords	Magmar	Voice
1988	Faceless	Terry Hallen	
1993	Mind Twister	Richard Howland	
1995	Backfire!	Most Evil Man	Posthumous release (final film role)

=== Television ===
Year	Title	Role	Notes
1959	NBC Sunday Showcase	Cotton	Episode: "Murder and the Android"
1959–1960	Armstrong Circle Theatre	Dieter Wislieny / Dieter Wisliceny / Father Dominique Georges Henn Pire / Charles Rogan	6 episodes
1960	Diagnosis: Unknown	Tony 'Irish Tony' Salivarro	Episode: "Gina, Gina"
1960	Dow Hour of Great Mysteries	Unknown	Episode: "The Cat and the Canary"
1960	The Witness	Al Capone / Charlie 'Lucky' Luciano	3 episodes
1960	Naked City	Gabriel Hody	Episode: "To Walk in Silence"
1960	The United States Steel Hour	Unknown	Episode: "Operation North Star"
1961	The Aquanauts	Paul Price	Episode: "Stormy Weather"
1961	Acapulco	Mr. Carver	8 episodes
1961	King of Diamonds	Massis / Jerry Larch	2 episodes
1961	The New Breed	Dr. Buel Reed	Episode: "The Compulsion to Confess"
1961	The Dick Powell Show	Sergeant Marius	Episode: "Three Soldiers"
1961	The Detectives	Ben	Episode: "Escort"
1961	Ben Casey	George Dempsey	Episode: "A Dark Night for Billy Harris"
1961–1962	Cain's Hundred	Harry Remick / Frank Meehan	2 episodes
1961–1963	The Untouchables	Leo Stazak / Matt Bass / Wally Baltzer	3 episodes
1962	Alcoa Premiere	Mario Lombardi	Episode: "The Hands of Danofrio"
1963	The Eleventh Hour	Ben Cohen	Episode: "A Tumble from a High White House"
1963	The Dakotas	Jake Volet	Episode: "Reformation at Big Nose Butte"
1963	Empire	Tibor	Episode: "Arrow in the Sky"
1963	Grindl	Mr. Hartman	Episode: "The Gruesome Basement"
1963	77 Sunset Strip	Brother Hendricksen	Episode: "5: Part 4"
1963	The Twilight Zone	Erich Streator	Episode: "Living Doll"
1963–1965	Burke's Law	Balakirov, Richard Goldtooth / Charlie Prince / Fakir George O'Shea	3 episodes
1964	Kraft Suspense Theatre	Ramon Castillo / Raymond Castle / Beret	2 episodes
1964	Channing	Paul Atherton	Episode: "A Claim to Immortality"
1964	Arrest and Trial	Frank Santo	Episode: "The Revenge of the Worm"
1964	Alfred Hitchcock Presents	Harry 'Philadelphia Harry'	Episode: "A Matter of Murder"
1964	Breaking Point	Vincenzo Gracchi	Episode: "My Hands Are Clean"
1964	The Rogues	General Hector Jesus Diaz	Episode: "Viva Diaz!"
1964	Fanfare for a Death Scene	Ikhedai Khan	Television film
1964–1966	The Fugitive	Steve Keller / Victor Leonetti / Dan Polichek	3 episodes
1964–1967	Combat!	Jon / Colonel Kapsalis	2 episodes
1965	Bonanza	Charles Augustus Hackett	Episode: "To Own the World"
1965	Run for Your Life	Istvan Zabor	Episode: "How to Sell Your Soul for Fun and Profit"
1966	The Virginian	'Colonel' Bliss	Episode: "Men with Guns"
1967	The F.B.I.	Ed Clementi	Episode-2 part: "The Executioners"
1967	The Man from U.N.C.L.E	Count Valerino De Fanzini	2 episodes
1967	Bob Hope Presents the Chrysler Theatre	Mueller	Episode: "Don't Wait for Tomorrow"
1967	Garrison's Gorillas	Wheeler	Episode: "The Big Con"
1967	Cimarron Strip	'Bear'	Episode: "The Battleground"
1970	The Red Skelton Show	'Tex'	Episode: "Stagecoach Hijack"
1971	ITV Sunday Night Theatre	Gregor Antonescu	Episode: "Man and Boy"
1971	Mongo's Back in Town	Lieutenant Pete Tolstad	Television film (also known as Steel Wreath)
1972	Visions...	Lieutenant Phil Keegan	Television film
1973	The Marcus-Nelson Murders	Lieutenant Theo Kojak	Television film Nominated—Primetime Emmy Award for Outstanding Single Performance by an Actor in a Leading Role
1973	She Cried Murder	Inspector Joe Brody	Television film
1973–1978	Kojak	Lieutenant Theo Kojak	118 episodes Golden Globe Award for Best Actor in a Television Series – Drama (1975–1976); Primetime Emmy Award for Best Lead Actor in a Drama Series (1974); Nominated—Golden Globe Award for Best Actor in a Television Series – Drama (1977–1978); Nominated—Primetime Emmy Award for Outstanding Lead Actor in a Drama Series (1975); Nominated—Primetime Emmy Award for Outstanding Directing in a Drama Series (1975)
1974	The Carol Burnett Show	Himself	Season 8 Episode 5
1975	Am Iaufenden Band	Singer / Kojak	Episode: #2.1
1975	Royal Variety Performance	Himself	Performed in front of Queen Elizabeth II & the Duke of Edinburgh at the London Palladium on November 10, 1975.
1978	Windows, Doors & Keyholes	Unknown	Television film
1979	Alice	Himself	Episode: "Has Anyone Here Seen Telly?"
1979	The French Atlantic Affair	Father Craig Dunleavy	Television miniseries
1980	Alcatraz: The Whole Shocking Story	Cretzer	Television film
1981	Hellinger's Law	Nick Hellinger	Television film (originally planned as a pilot for a series)
1981	Tales of the Unexpected	Joe Brisson	Episode: "Completely Foolproof"
1982	American Playhouse	Peter Panakos	Episode: "My Palikari"
1984	The Cartier Affair	Phil Drexler	Television film
1985	The Love Boat	Dr. Fabian Cain	2 episodes
1985	Kojak: The Belarus File	Lieutenant Theo Kojak	Television film (featuring returning Kojak co-stars George Savalas, Dan Frazer, Mark Russell and Vince Conti)
1985	George Burns Comedy Week	Unknown	Episode: "The Assignment"
1985	Alice in Wonderland	The Cheshire Cat	Television film
1985	Solomon's Universe	Solomon Stark	Television film
1987	Kojak: The Price of Justice	Inspector Theo Kojak	Television film
1987	The Dirty Dozen: The Deadly Mission	Major Wright	Television film
1987	The Equalizer	Brother Joseph Heiden	Episode: "Blood and Wine"
1987	J.J. Starbuck	The Greek	Episode: "Gold from the Rainbow"
1988	The Dirty Dozen: The Fatal Mission	Major Wright	Television film
1989	The Hollywood Detective	Harry Bell	Television film
1989	Kojak: Ariana	Inspector Theo Kojak	Television film
1989	Kojak: Fatal Flaw	Inspector Theo Kojak	Television film
1990	Kojak: Flowers for Matty	Inspector Theo Kojak	Television film
1990	Kojak: It's Always Something	Inspector Theo Kojak	Television film (with Kojak co-star Kevin Dobson)
1990	Kojak: None So Blind	Inspector Theo Kojak	Television film
1991	Rose Against the Odds	George Parnassus	Television miniseries
1991–1993	Ein Schloß am Wörthersee	Teddy	2 episodes
1992–1993	The Commish	Tommy Colette	3 episodes
1993	The Extraordinary	Himself	Season 1, Episode 1

== Awards and nominations ==
Year	Award	Category	Nominated work	Results	Ref.
1962	Academy Awards	Best Supporting Actor	Birdman of Alcatraz	Nominated	
1962	Golden Globe Awards	Best Supporting Actor – Motion Picture	Birdman of Alcatraz	Nominated	
1965	Golden Globe Awards	Best Supporting Actor – Motion Picture	Battle of the Bulge	Nominated	
1974	Golden Globe Awards	Best Actor in a Television Series – Drama	Kojak	Won	
1975	Golden Globe Awards	Best Actor in a Television Series – Drama	Kojak	Won (Note: Tied with Robert Blake for Baretta.)	
1976	Golden Globe Awards	Best Actor in a Television Series – Drama	Kojak	Nominated	
1977	Golden Globe Awards	Best Actor in a Television Series – Drama	Kojak	Nominated	
1973	Primetime Emmy Awards	Outstanding Single Performance by an Actor in a Leading Role	The Marcus-Nelson Murders	Nominated	
1974	Primetime Emmy Awards	Best Lead Actor in a Drama Series	Kojak (Episode: "Requiem for a Cop")	Won	
1975	Primetime Emmy Awards	Outstanding Lead Actor in a Drama Series	Kojak	Nominated	
1975	Primetime Emmy Awards	Outstanding Directing in a Drama Series	Kojak (Episode: "I Want to Report a Dream...")	Nominated	

== Discography ==
=== Albums ===
- This is Telly Savalas... (1972)
- Telly (1974)
- Telly Savalas (1975)
- Who Loves Ya Baby (1976)
- Sweet Surprise [released on cassette and CD under the title Some Broken Hearts] (1980)

=== Singles ===
- "Try to Remember" (1972)
- "Look Around You" (1972)
- "I Don't Want To Know / I Walk The Line" (1972)
- "We All End Up The Same" (1972)
- "If" (1974)
- "You've Lost That Lovin' Feelin' / Help Me Make It Through the Night" (1974)
- "Who Loves Ya Baby" (1975)
- "A Good Time Man Like Me Ain't Got No Business Singing The Blues" (1976)
- "Sweet Surprise" (1980)
- "Some Broken Hearts Never Mend" (1980)
- "Lovin' Understandin' Man" (1981)
- "Goodbye Madame" (1982)
