= Kojak =

American crime drama television series (1973–1978)

- Title logo, 1973–1974
- Genre: Crime drama
- Created by: Abby Mann (suggested by the book Justice in the Back Room, written by Selwyn Raab)
- Starring: Telly Savalas; Dan Frazer; Kevin Dobson; George Savalas; Mark Russell; Vince Conti
- Country of origin: United States
- Original language: English
- No. of seasons: 5
- No. of episodes: 118 (list of episodes)

Production
- Executive producers: Abby Mann; James Duff McAdams; Matthew Rapf
- Running time: 50 minutes
- Production company: Universal Television

Original release
- Network: CBS
- Release: October 24, 1973 – March 18, 1978

Kojak is an American action crime drama television series starring Telly Savalas as the title character, New York City Police Department Detective Lieutenant Theophilus "Theo" Kojak. Taking the time slot of the popular Cannon series, it aired on CBS from 1973 to 1978. The series was reprised as seven television movies in the 1980s and as a television series in 2005 starring Ving Rhames. It was also the basis for a series of novels, an audio drama, and a line of toys.

In 1999, TV Guide ranked Theo Kojak number 18 on its 50 Greatest Television Characters Hall of Fame list.

== Production ==
The show was created by Abby Mann, an Academy Award–winning film writer best known for his work on drama anthologies such as Robert Montgomery Presents and Playhouse 90. Universal Television approached him to do a story based on the 1963 Wylie-Hoffert murders, the brutal rape and murder of two young professional women in Manhattan.

Poor and corrupt police work and the prevailing casual attitude toward suspects' civil rights led the crimes in the Wylie-Hoffert case to be pinned on a young African American man, George Whitmore Jr., who had been arrested on a separate assault charge. After illegally obtaining a confession, the police had the suspect all but convicted until a second investigation by a different team of detectives exonerated the suspect and identified the real killer, Richard Robles, who was convicted in 1965 and sentenced to life in prison.

Mann developed the project as a gritty police procedural, but with a subtext focusing on institutionalized prejudice and the civil rights of suspects and witnesses. The result was a 1973 made-for-TV movie, The Marcus-Nelson Murders. The opening and closing titles of the film emphasized the point that it was a fictional account of the events that led to the creation of Miranda rights by the U.S. Supreme Court in 1966. Selwyn Raab's book Justice in the Back Room provided Mann with some of his inspiration for the story of The Marcus-Nelson Murders, and the series subsequently included a credits reference to having been "suggested by a book by Selwyn Raab".

Savalas starred in The Marcus-Nelson Murders as a police detective whose last name was spelled "Kojack". The film served as a pilot for the Kojak television series. Kojak himself was a composite character, based on a number of detectives, lawyers, and reporters who were involved in the Wylie-Hoffert murder case.

== Plot ==
=== Series ===
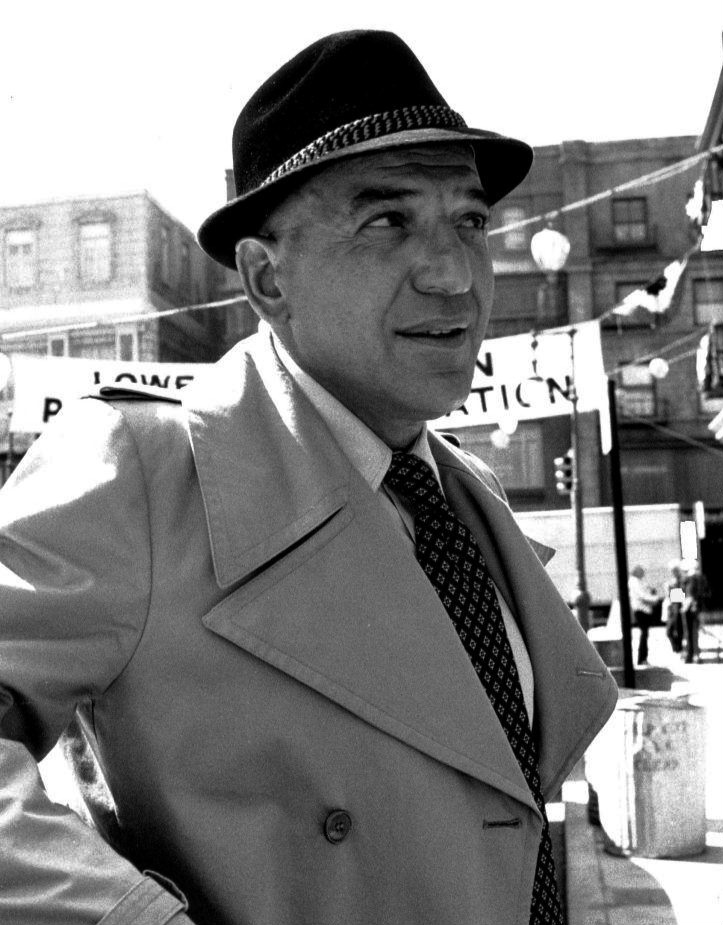
Telly Savalas as Lieutenant Theo Kojak, wearing the iconic trilby hat in a 1973 photo.

The series is set in the New York City Police Department's Eleventh Precinct (the building shown was actually Ninth Precinct), Manhattan South Patrol Borough. The series was also filmed in New York City.

The show revolved around the efforts of the tough and incorruptible Lieutenant Theophilus ("Theo") Kojak (Telly Savalas), a bald, dapper New York City policeman, who was fond of Dum-Dums and has become widely associated with catchphrases "Who loves ya, baby?", "Quit ya bellyaching", and "Cootchie-coo!", although he only ever said the full phrase "Who loves ya, baby?" a total of three times across the original 118-episode run. Kojak was stubborn and tenacious in his investigation of crimes—and also displayed a dark, cynical wit, along with a tendency to bend the rules if it brought a criminal to justice.

In the context of the script, Kojak's was seen as typical squad-room humor, which was picked up later in the TV drama Hill Street Blues. Savalas described Kojak as a "basically honest character, tough but with feelings—the kind of guy who might kick a hooker in the tail if he had to, but they'd understand each other because maybe they grew up on the same kind of block." Kojak's Greek American heritage, shared by actor Savalas, was featured prominently in the series.

Telly Savalas as Lt. Theo Kojak with ubiquitous lollipop

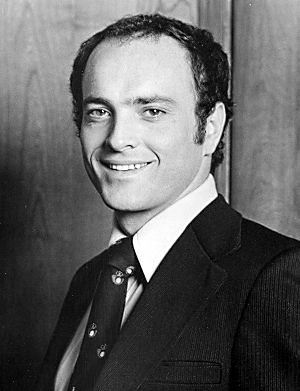
Kevin Dobson as Sergeant Robert "Bobby" Crocker, Kojak's fellow detective and partner (pictured in 1975)

In the early episodes of the series, he is often seen smoking cigarettes. Following the 1964 Surgeon General's Report on smoking, cigarette commercials were banned from American television in 1971, and public awareness of the dangers of cigarette smoking increased dramatically during the 1970s. To cut down on his own habit, Kojak began using lollipops as a substitute. The lollipop made its debut in the Season 1 episode "Dark Sunday", broadcast on December 12, 1973; Kojak lights a cigarette as he begins questioning a witness, but thinks better of it and sticks a lollipop (specifically, a Tootsie Pop) in his mouth instead. Later in the episode, Kevin Dobson's character Crocker asks about the lollipop and Kojak replies, "I'm looking to close the generation gap." Although Kojak continued to smoke, as he was frequently seen lighting a cigarillo, the lollipop eventually became his identifying characteristic; in fact, when the series debuted a new opening montage in season five, Kojak is seen both lighting a cigarillo and popping a lollipop into his mouth.

His longtime supervisor was Capt. Frank McNeil (Dan Frazer), a man who never seemed to know what was going on. Later in the series, McNeil was promoted to Chief of Detectives in Manhattan. Kojak is the commander of the Manhattan South Precinct's detective squad. His squad includes one of his favorite employees, young plainclothes officer, Det. Bobby Crocker (Kevin Dobson). Detective Stavros, played by Telly's real-life brother George Savalas, used the name "Demosthenes" as his screen credit during the first two seasons. George Savalas, under his real name, also received a Production Associate credit during the first season and a Production Assistant credit for the second season. Detective Saperstein (Mark Russell), and Detective Rizzo (Vince Conti), all gave Kojak support. Roger Robinson appeared in 12 episodes as Detective Gil Weaver.

Although the show primarily focused on Kojak's police work, it occasionally veered into other areas of the characters' lives, such as the first-season episode "Knockover", which included a subplot involving Kojak romancing a (much younger) female police officer. In 1976, crime writer Joe Gores received an Edgar Award from the Mystery Writers of America for Best Episode in a TV Series Teleplay for the third-season episode "No Immunity for Murder" (first aired November 23, 1975).

The show was canceled after five seasons in 1978, due to falling ratings. Reruns of Kojak became successful in syndication and on TV Land.

=== TV movies ===
Years after the series ended, Savalas reprised the role in two CBS TV movies, Kojak: The Belarus File (1985) (an adaptation of the John Loftus book The Belarus Secret) and Kojak: The Price of Justice (1987) (based on Dorothy Uhnak's novel The Investigation). Kojak is not a character in either book. Dan Frazer, George Savalas, Mark Russell and Vince Conti made their final appearances in The Belarus File.

In 1989, ABC revived the series again with five additional TV movies. These films saw now-Inspector Kojak lead the NYPD's Major Crimes Squad. Andre Braugher was cast as Winston Blake, a young detective assigned to Kojak's command. Kevin Dobson returned for the fourth film It's Always Something.

Telly Savalas and Dan Frazer are the only cast members to appear in every episode of the original series. Kevin Dobson appeared in all but two episodes, while George Savalas appeared in all but three.

== Characters ==
- Telly Savalas as Lieutenant Theophilus "Theo" Kojak
- Dan Frazer as Captain Francis "Frank" McNeil, Kojak's boss
- Kevin Dobson as Detective 3rd Grade Robert "Bobby" Crocker
- George Savalas (credited as Demosthenes in Seasons 1–2) as Detective Sergeant Demosthenes Stavros
- Mark Russell as Detective Mark Saperstein
- Vince Conti as Detective Gino Rizzo
- Roger Robinson as Detective Gil Weaver

== Music ==
Two main title themes were used for the show. The somewhat better-known first Kojak theme, in two distinct arrangements, is the work of Billy Goldenberg, who scored the first two episodes of the series (Goldenberg also scored the series' pilot movie). The first of these two arrangements was used for episodes 1–27. The second of these two arrangements was used for episodes 28–96. Kim Richmond scored the series' third episode. John Cacavas composed the second main title theme used for the show's fifth and final season. In addition, Cacavas composed the music score beginning with the series' fourth episode and continued throughout the remainder of the series.

Goldenberg's first Kojak theme had lyrics, written by Bill Dyer. The song, entitled We'll Make It This Time (Theme from Kojak) was performed by Sammy Davis Jr. on his 1976 album The Song and Dance Man.

== Cars ==
Kojak drove an unmarked police car. A 1973 Buick Century police detective car with full wheel covers and a 1974 Buick Century 455 badged sedan with small wheel covers were used. Both cars were dark brown (GM Nutmeg Poly). The 1973 grille (section above the bumper) has three horizontal bars while the 1974 has five horizontal bars. A blue 1974 Century sedan was also featured. Later in the series, the brown Century was replaced by a 1975 copper color model. The New York orange with dark blue lettered license plate on the brown police detective car was 383-JDZ.

== Episodes ==
Kojak aired for five seasons on CBS, from 1973 to 1978 for a total of 118 episodes. In the United Kingdom, the series premiered on 24 August 1974 on BBC1. In 1985, seven years after the series ended, Telly Savalas returned to play Kojak in seven TV movies beginning with Kojak: The Belarus File. The first two were aired by CBS and the latter five were aired on ABC as part of their ABC Saturday Mystery Movie theme block. His character was promoted to the rank of captain, and later inspector. Andre Braugher co-starred as Det. Winston Blake, and for one TV movie, Kojak: It's Always Something, Kevin Dobson returned as Bobby Crocker, now an assistant district attorney. Guest stars in these TV movies included Angie Dickinson, Marcia Gay Harden, Max von Sydow, Jerry Orbach and Suzanne Pleshette.

== Broadcast history and Nielsen ratings ==
Season	Time slot (ET)	Rank	Rating
1973–74	Wednesday at 10:00 p.m.	7	23.3 (Tied with The Sonny & Cher Comedy Hour)
1974–75	Sunday at 8:30 p.m.	14	23.3
1975–76	Sunday at 9:00 p.m.	20	21.8
1976–77	Sunday at 9:00 p.m. (1976); Tuesday at 10:00 p.m. (1977)	63	17.1
1977–78	Sunday at 10:00 p.m. (October 2 – December 4, 1977); Saturday at 10:00 p.m. (December 10, 1977 – March 18, 1978)	87	14.3

== Remake ==
In March 2005, a new Kojak series debuted on the USA Network cable channel and on ITV4 in the UK. In this re-imagined version, African-American actor Ving Rhames portrays the character. The series only lasted one season.

== In other media ==
=== Books ===
There was a series of novelizations written by Victor B. Miller.

- Kojak #1: Siege. New York: Pocket Books, 1974
- Kojak #2: Requiem for a Cop. New York: Pocket Books,1974
- Kojak #3: Girl in the River. New York: Pocket Books, 1975
- Kojak #4: Therapy in Dynamite. New York: Pocket Books, 1975
- Kojak #5: Death Is Not a Passing Grade. New York: Pocket Books, 1975
- Kojak #6: A Very Deadly Game. New York: Pocket Books, 1975
- Kojak #7: Take-Over. New York: Pocket Books, 1975
- Kojak #8: Gun Business. New York: Pocket Books, 1975
- Kojak #9: The Trade-off. New York: Pocket Books, 1975.

Several titles were reprinted in the Pocket Books series for the British market by Star Books and one title, Marked for Murder, published in 1976, that was not in the American numbered series. Also, reprints with a different cover for Requiem for a Cop and Girl in the River were published in 1975.

Another book was published by Berkley Medallion Books in 1976. The author was Thom Racina and was titled, Kojak in San Francisco with a tagline, "The story that couldn't be shown on TV."

There were three annuals for Kojak published in 1977 (62 pages; Stafford Pemberton Publishing), 1978, and 1979.

=== Audio dramas ===
Despite the show being ostensibly produced for an adult audience, Peter Pan Records produced an album of audio dramas based upon the series, aimed at children. This 12" album has an audio record and a story book released in 1977.

=== Film ===
David and Leslie Newman's original script for Superman: The Movie featured a cameo appearance by Savalas as Kojak, with Superman mistaking him for Lex Luthor and accidentally capturing him. This scene was written out of the film after Richard Donner and Tom Mankiewicz became involved and shifted the film towards a less campy and more serious tone.

Universal Pictures is planning to make a film version of Kojak, with Neal Purvis and Robert Wade to write the script for the film. Vin Diesel will star as Kojak and produce the film with Samantha Vincent. Philip Gawthorne was hired to construct a new draft for the film.

On June 19, 2015 it was reported in media outlets that playwright Philip Gawthorne is on board for the new Kojak movie being written for Universal. Kojak is being produced by Diesel's Universal-based One Race Films with Scott Stuber and Dylan Clark. Neal Purvis and Robert Wade, the writing team behind James Bond films including The World Is Not Enough and Skyfall, joined the project in 2012 to write a previous draft.

== Home media ==
Universal Studios released season 1 of Kojak on DVD in Regions 1, 2 and 4 in 2005–2006. Due to poor sales, no further seasons were released.

On February 14, 2017, Universal Studios re-released season 1 on DVD in Region 1.

On May 25, 2011, it was announced that Shout! Factory had acquired the Region 1 DVD rights to the series. They have subsequently released the remaining 4 seasons on DVD as well as a complete movie collection.

In Region 2, Mediumrare Entertainment has released the complete TV series on DVD in the UK. The Marcus-Nelson Murders, The Belarus File, and The Price of Justice, have all been released on DVD separately. To date, the other movies have not been released on DVD in Region 2.

In Region 4, Shock Entertainment has released seasons 2–5 on DVD in Australia.

Product	Episodes	DVD release date			Blu-ray release date
Product	Episodes	United States (R1)	United Kingdom (R2)	Australia (R4)	Blu-ray release date
Season 1	22	March 22, 2005	18 July 2005	13 July 2005	—
Season 2	25	September 27, 2011	26 April 2010	—	—
Season 3	24	March 20, 2012	26 April 2010	—	—
Season 4	25	May 1, 2012	29 August 2011	—	—
Season 5	22	September 11, 2012	29 August 2011	—	—
The Complete Movie Collection	8	January 24, 2012	—	—	—
The Complete Series	125	—	17 November 2014	—	—

== Merchandise ==
In 1976 Vanity Fair produced the Kojak Walkie Talkies designed as battery operated on 4 transistor Solid State transceivers. The two-piece walkie-talkie set meets all FCC standards. The units were able to detach the microphone from the handset and there was a Morse Code key guide on the devices. It had a telescopic antenna and a volume control. These devices were black in color as opposed to the blue-colored toy called Kojak Walkie Talkie.

Introduced in 1977, a bicycle and tricycle battery accessory was produced as a siren. It was made in Hong Kong as model 1300 and a safety 14-inch (360 mm) starter cord. The packaging indicated, "This siren is with or meets the specifications of California vehicle code section 670 and 27002."

In 1978, Universal Security Instruments, Inc. of Owings Mills, Maryland introduced a Kojak complete burglar alarm system, "for protection where is counts." The packaging had Kojak with a lollipop on the front and the back and included Kojak installation instructions. The system had a protective electric loop for windows and doors. A break-in and cutting wires would cause an alarm to sound. The device operated on a 12-volt battery and included extra loud "B" bell, heavy-duty weather-resistant cabinet with built-in tamper resistant circuit, 125 feet (38 m) of double stranded wire, six sets of magnetic switches, two keys, panic button, indoor "ON-OFF" control, and warning decals. Features were built-in timer to shut off the siren in five minutes and LED indicator light for indication if alarm was triggered. This alarm system was considered wired perimeter as the lowest-cost of $50.

In 2022, there are selling sites with vehicle lights and strobes. One model by Grote is the "BEACN KOJAK TEAR DROP 12V RED" as Mfr. Model #76032, which is a 12volt cigarette lighter plug and cord attached to a magnetic mounted base strobe light. The amber model is Mfr. Model #76033 and has the same teardrop design lens that emits 80 flashes per minute in a rotating beacon. Both items comply to SAE J845 Class I standards.

=== Toys ===
==== 1970s ====
There were mini trading cards with bubble gum included in packs made in Holland and solely imported by Lemberger Food Co. Inc. in Palisades Park, New Jersey. A pack of 8 cards and 1 piece of gum were sold part of the collection at 10 cents. The merchandise packaging had copyright of Universal Television, Division of Universal City Studios INC. This Monty Gum collection is a set of mini-trading cards in 1 7/8-by-2 5/8-inch (48 by 67 mm) size with 72 color images of the series on the front side with a puzzle on the back side. Another set had deckle edged 100 images of the series to arrange the puzzle, on the back was a monochrome Kojak with a lollipop and card number. Also, in the Monty Gum collection was a 56 playing card deck with double monochrome Kojak on the telephone image on the front. This is how to determine the differences in the three card sets with Kojak (on telephone or with lollipop) or none. The size of the playing cards was approximately 2 by 3 inches (51 mm × 76 mm) in size. The playing cards had all different images with four Kojaks as Joker Card (no sunglasses, sunglasses, lollipop, no sunglasses and no lollipop) and was made for foreign markets as K, D Q V, and J B are shown for the face cards.

Also, Milton Bradley manufactured a Kojak board game, called The Stake Out Detective. Another company, Arrow Games, Ltd, manufactured a different board game design as well in that year, calling it Kojak Detective Game. This identical play board game design had a French version by MB Jeux called "Enigmes Policieieres" and a combo English-/French-language board game version by Somerville Industries Lt (of London, Ontario, Canada) called "Jeu de Détective" ("Detective Game").

Given that the Kojak TV series was already showing in the UK, Mettoy Toy Co. Ltd. of Northampton, UK, introduced Corgi Toys (model no. 690) Kojak's Buick as a diecast 1:36 scale replica of the 74 Century car and indicated it as a 74 Regal. This toy car includes a standing, blue suit, bald "Kojak" and movable in the back seat, "Crocker" figures in firearm shooting positions. Another version was a standing, black suit, black hat "Kojak" with "Crocker" with no appearance difference. The vehicle had the two front doors that would open, a "gun shot sound" from rolling the rear bumper wheel, and a detachable red beacon on the roof. The packaging was designed for the British, French, and German markets and included a New York Police Department Lieutenant self-adhesive police badge.

Also, Excel Toys manufactured in Hong Kong an 8-inch (20 cm) action figure of Kojak with all accessories including glasses, lollipops, cigar, holster, police revolver, and hat. One action figure was the blue suit (item no. 550) and the other was the pinstriped suit. The company had item no. 574, as a Police Emergency Set hand accessory kit for the action figures that included a bull horn, handcuffs, walkie-talkie, trench coat with belt, helmet, and riot gun. The action figures would be completed with a Headquarters background playset with a folded pop-up card table, desks with chair, file cabinets, coat rack, and bad guy action figure.

Tomy introduced a Chad Valley Kojak Walkie Talkie. A battery operated device that had six Kojak phrases recorded when you pressed the button. The device was blue with a metal antenna that could be raised and lowered, but does not transmit or receive. The device had a clip for to attach on your belt or waist shorts/pants. The trademark was M.C.A. Universal City Studies, Inc.

The Chad Valley Company Ltd., also had the Kojak Target Game with a plastic gun, pop-up knock down target, belt clip with special safety darts, and target feet. More spare darts could be ordered as 10 darts in 2 belt clips from the Birmingham, England factory.

The Mettoy Toy Co. Ltd. in Northampton, U.K., introduced Corgi Junior (no. 68,) Kojak Buick copper color sedan with only the fixed red beacon on the roof with no character figures nor front doors opening. The packing was a trademark of and licensed by Universal Studies, Inc. Additionally, there was the Corgi Junior (no. 2527,) Kojak New York Police that included the Buick copper color sedan and a blue City of New York Police helicopter. The scale was 1:55 for the Corgi Junior replicas.

Continental Plastics Corp. of Hollis, NY had a made in Hong Kong item no 9116-5. It was branded as Harmony as the Kojak Detective Scope that had "9 ways to use it." It was one plastic item that was a microscope, magnifier, flat mirror, telescope, fire lighter, binoculars, solar clock, compass, code messages, and reading glasses. The packing was a trademark of and licensed by Universal Studies, Inc. and had a 1.00 dollar plus tax price sticker.

Continental Plastics Corp. made another Hong Kong item no 9. It was branded as Harmony as the Kojak Walkie Talkie that had a badge, ID, and whistle. Also, the packing was a trademark and licensed with a 1.00 dollar plus tax price sticker. This plastic toy was not operational as other models available.

Also, Lone Star Products Ltd. produced a Kojak cast metal repeater cap pistol as catalog no 1180.

Continental Plastics Corp. made another Hong Kong item as no 9128-9. It was branded as Harmony with the Kojak Harbor Patrol that included chopper, rescue boats, and ID card. The packing was a trademark of and licensed by Universal Studies, Inc. and had a .79 cents-plus-tax price sticker. The item appeared as set up from another series by consumers opinions.

Additionally, Ideal Toy Company, of Hollis, NY, produced the Pocket Flix as a battery-operated handheld motorized movie viewer with a sold separately Kojak Snap on Movie cassette clip of the series.

Another trading card appeared in the Swedish Samlarsaker (collectibles) set of Swedish Pop Stars non-sport trading cards featuring Kojak as card 702.

==== Later toys ====
Corgi reissued the Kojak Buick Regal under its Corgi Classics banner (#57403). This had no beacon, no sound, and no "Crocker" in the rear seat. A standing Kojak figure was in a shooting position; "hand painted and cast in white metal rather than plastic, using the familiar fedora hat and coat mould."

This same model by Corgi Classics was repackaged one final time (#CC00501) as the same Buick, with a small card figure of Kojak.

Decades later, a manufacturer has Kojak car license plate, "383 JDZ" in a "1/24 1/25 scale model car movie TV license plates tags" to be used on model cars.

Another toy manufacturer, Goldvarg Collection, created a 1:43 scale of the Kojak car described as "1974 Buick Century colour Nutmeg Poly."

There is a custom manufacturer that creates a "1/6 scale custom Telly Savalas Kojack [sic] Action Figure head" to be placed on 12 inches (300 mm) action figure bodies.

On an internet selling site, novelty Kojak and Crocker Police Badges are made ID's printed on CR80 PVC plastic credit card size, 3 3/8 in × 2 1/8 in (85.6 mm × 54 mm) as movie props with images of Lieutenant Theo Kojak (Telly Savalas) or Detective Bobby Crocker (Kevin Dobson).

There is a tiny plastic red or blue colored beacon that can be used on emergency vehicles. It has a description as a "1:25 scale model resin Federal Fireball Beacon red Kojak police light" or "1:25 scale model resin Federal Fireball Beacon blue Kojak police light." It also can be used on 1:24 scale vehicles. The item can be painted in enamel, acrylic, or lacquer. The manufacturer, Three Inches Under, introduced this item in 2014 as part, BEAKOJB.
