= John Cacavas =

American composer and conductor (1930–2014)

Background information
- Born: 13 August 1930; Aberdeen, South Dakota, U.S.
- Died: 28 January 2014 (aged 83) Beverly Hills, California, U.S.
- Genre: Film score
- Occupations: Composer, conductor, arranger

John Harry Cacavas (August 13, 1930 – January 28, 2014) was an American composer and conductor, best known for his television scores. He was the principal composer for Kojak (1973–78), also writing its second main title theme for its 5th and final season.

== Early life and education ==
Cacavas was born in Aberdeen, South Dakota in 1930. His father was an emigrant from Greece and his mother was born in North Dakota. He had a fraternal twin sister, Jeanne, and three other siblings: Peter David, b. 1928; Penelope, b. 1932; and Adrian G., 1933. Their father's younger brother Chris had also immigrated to South Dakota and lived in Aberdeen, where he married and had a family. John and his siblings attended local schools; he displayed an early talent for music, forming a local band at age 14, at 16 he started a school dance band named “The Golden Blues," he left after having a falling out with his band teacher after which he quit all school band activities. He studied musical composition at Northwestern University.

During service in the military, Cacavas was assigned to Washington, DC where he was an arranger for the United States Army Band. There he met Charles Osgood, with whom he collaborated on musical compositions and recordings. Osgood later became a radio and TV commentator.

== Career ==
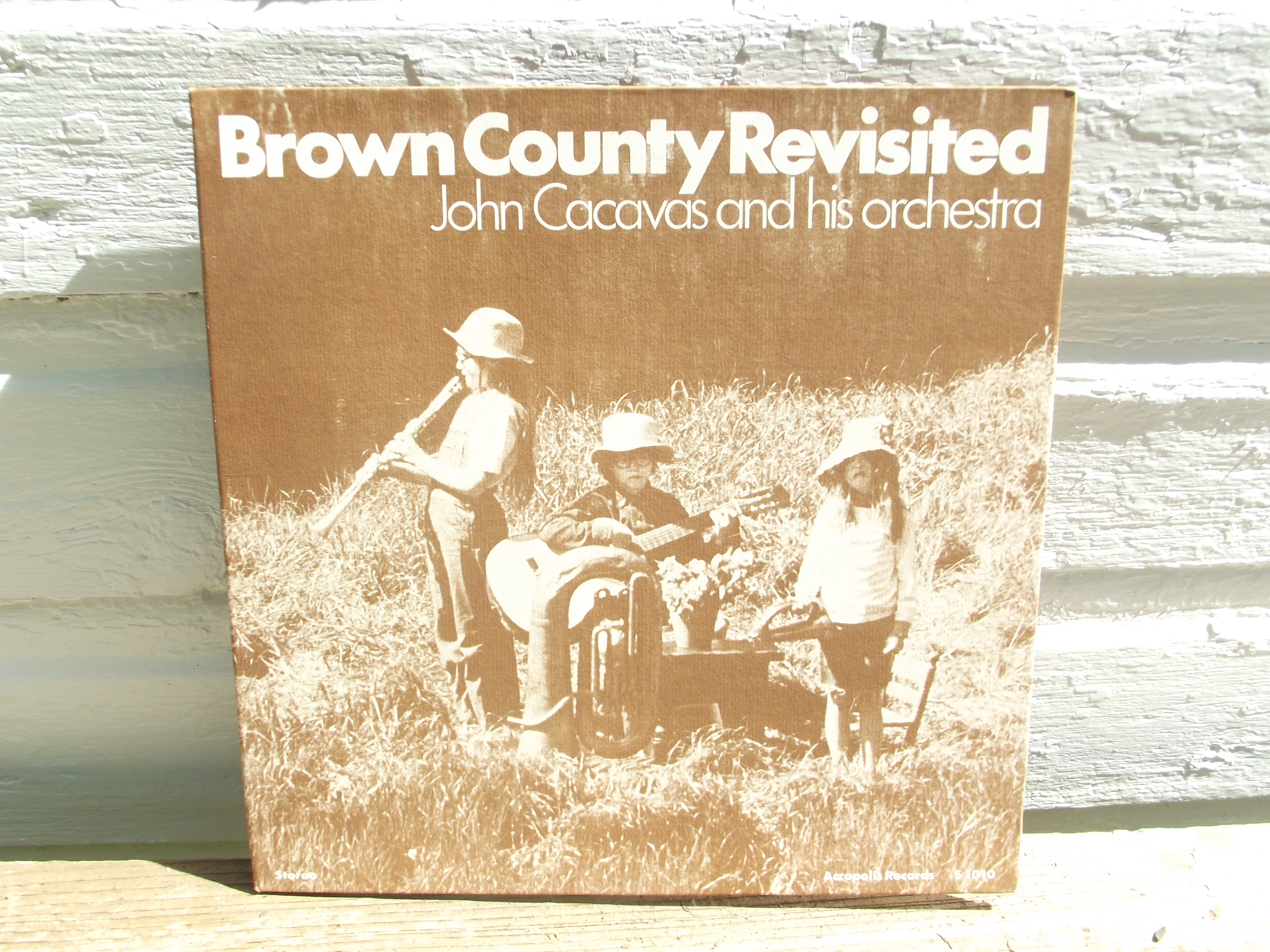
Brown County Revisted by Cacavas

After studying music, in the 1960s Cacavas and Osgood collaborated, including on US Senator Everett Dirksen's recording of Gallant Men, which won a Grammy Award for a spoken word performance. While working in London in the 1970s, Cacavas met actor Telly Savalas, who later helped him move into working on movie scores. Cacavas scored Savalas's 1972 cult horror film Horror Express, and he moved to Hollywood, where he began to compose scores for television series and movies produced for TV. His most noted scores were written for the series Kojak (1973–1978), for which he was the chief composer. For its 5th and final season in 1977–1978, Cacavas composed the show's second main title theme.

His television credits are extensive, including scoring the series Hawaii Five-O, The Bionic Woman, Mrs. Columbo, The Eddie Capra Mysteries, and Buck Rogers in the 25th Century, as well as television movies, such as The Elevator (1974), Friendly Persuasion (1975), Murder at the World Series (1977), SST: Death Flight (1977), Superdome (1978), The Time Machine (1978) and the 1982 film The Executioner's Song, starring Tommy Lee Jones. Scoring music for the 1981 television movie Hellinger's Law reunited him with Kojak veteran and friend Telly Savalas, and Cacavas also went on to score Savalas's made for TV Dirty Dozen sequel movies The Dirty Dozen: The Deadly Mission (1987) and The Dirty Dozen: The Fatal Mission (1988). His later television work included popular miniseries such as Jenny's War (1985), Confessional (1989) and Perfect Murder, Perfect Town in 2000.

While Cacavas has extensive credits in television he has comparatively few credits for film scores. His most notable works in film are two entries in the Airport series: Airport 1975 and Airport '77. As well as Horror Express he also composed the score for the Hammer film The Satanic Rites of Dracula (1973), which also starred Christopher Lee and Peter Cushing, and his other scores included Hangar 18 (1980), Gangster Wars (1981), Mortuary (1983), and They're Playing with Fire (1984).

Cacavas is also notable for his "Flute Poem", known by Canadian viewers as the opening to Hinterland Who's Who, a series of public service announcements profiling various wild Canadian animals.

Cacavas also composed and arranged many music scores for school bands and music students. There are many of his arrangements and compositions listed by music publishing houses such as Hal Leonard Corporation and Alfred Music Publishers.

In his later years, Cacavas wrote and published his autobiography, entitled It's More than Do-Re-Mi: My Life in Music (2004). He lived in Beverly Hills, California and London, UK, with his wife, Bonetta Becker Cacavas. Among his pleasures was cooking and he was an accomplished chef. They had three children.
