= Alan Metzger =

American film director

Alan Metzger is an American film director, cinematographer and producer. He directed numerous television films between 1987 and 2001. He is best known for director the series The Equalizer, starring Edward Woodward, as well as several movies, including Kojak the Price of Justice, For My Daughter's Honor, and If You Believe. In 2008 Metzger, along with Mark Dunetz and Edgar Rodriguez founded The Academy for Careers in Television and Film (ACTvF) a NYC Department of Education district high school specializing in teaching film crew skills along with a full college prep program.
