= An Unbelievable Story of Rape =

Pulitzer Prize-winning article about a series of rapes

"An Unbelievable Story of Rape" is a 2015 article about a series of rapes in the American states of Washington and Colorado that occurred between 2008 and 2011, and the subsequent police investigations. It was a collaboration between two American non-profit news organizations, The Marshall Project and ProPublica. The article was written by Ken Armstrong and T. Christian Miller. It won the 2016 Pulitzer Prize for Explanatory Reporting and the 2015 George Polk Award for Justice Reporting.

The article alternates between two true stories of events occurring between August 2008 and June 2012. The first narrative is about a woman in Lynnwood, Washington, known pseudonymously as "Marie", who reports being raped to the police. After repeated interrogation by the police, who do not believe her, she says that her report was false. She is subsequently charged with a gross misdemeanor for false reporting. The second narrative details the police investigations into a serial rapist in Colorado, who is known to have raped four women and made a fifth attempt. The man is arrested in February 2011, and subsequent evidence on his hard drive reveals that Marie, not previously known to the local investigative team, was raped by him.

T. Christian Miller of ProPublica had been reporting on law enforcement failures in identifying rapists throughout 2015. In August, he learned of the case of Marie and contacted her lawyer, discovering that Ken Armstrong of The Marshall Project was already working on a similar story. They began to collaborate, with Armstrong writing about Marie's story in Washington and Miller writing about the police investigation in Colorado. Marie agreed to speak to Armstrong after six months of communication. The article was further informed by other interviews and thousands of pages of public records material.

The article was later adapted into the Netflix series Unbelievable (2019), which has received critical acclaim. The article also provided the basis of Miller and Armstrong's full-length book A False Report: A True Story of Rape in America (2018).

== Background ==
=== History ===
"An Unbelievable Story of Rape" was written by Ken Armstrong and T. Christian Miller. A collaboration between The Marshall Project and ProPublica, it was published on both websites on December 16, 2015. Colorado publication Westword reprinted the article as their cover story on May 19, 2016. The Marshall Project and ProPublica are American non-profit online news organizations. The Marshall Project specializes in criminal justice.

T. Christian Miller was a senior reporter at ProPublica. Throughout 2015, he had been reporting on the failure of law enforcement to trace rapists, including the case of Darren Sharper, a football player who raped nine women. Miller had discovered that a Federal Bureau of Investigation (FBI) database to identify serial murderers and rapists was mostly unused in the cases of rape, as most police departments fail to upload sexual assault reports. His article "The FBI Built a Database That Can Catch Rapists — Almost Nobody Uses It" was published in July 2015.

By August 2015, Miller was working on a report about the Washington and Colorado serial rape cases. He focused on a woman who recanted a report of rape after intense police interrogation. Years later her account was proven true when the rapist was prosecuted and convicted. In the article, Miller referred to the woman by her middle name "Marie". Miller called the woman's lawyer and discovered she was in contact with Ken Armstrong of The Marshall Project, who had been working on an article about the case for several months. The teams decided to collaborate.

=== Research and writing ===
Armstrong's editor Joe Sexton and Miller's editor Bill Keller had worked together at The New York Times. Numerous other editors contributed to the article, including managing editor Kirsten Danis of The Marshall Project. As the two reporters and two primary editors were all male, the team ensured that they consulted various women, some with knowledge of the case and some without, particularly in regards to how graphic or detailed to make the description of Marie's rape.

Miller wrote the sections about the woman in Colorado, while Armstrong wrote the sections about the investigation in Washington. The sections are ordered alternately, with an opening paragraph about the woman in Washington being charged with false reporting. The structure was proposed by Sexton. The first draft was 15,000 words in length, shortened to 12,000 in the final version. Keller and other editors recommended reducing the ending of the article, and creating a short epilogue.

As part of their research, Armstrong and Miller made public records requests to police departments and prosecuting attorney's offices in Washington and Colorado. They received thousands of pages of documents, including investigative reports, case reviews, crime scene photographs, and surveillance footage of convicted perpetrator Marc Patrick O'Leary after his arrest. News coverage, criminal justice guidelines, and court transcripts were also consulted. Extracts of an external report made of the mean-spirited incompetence ("bullying… coercive, cruel, and unbelievably unprofessional") of the police department that pushed Marie to first become flustered enough to concede it might have been a dream, then pushed her until she recanted her rape as being a lie, were made public for the first time in the article.

After seven months of email and phone communication with Marie's lawyer, Marie agreed to speak to Armstrong. It was the first time she had agreed to be interviewed by a journalist. Armstrong and Miller also interviewed two of Marie's foster parents and her friend, her public defender and civil suit attorney. The pair spoke to various police officers, including Detectives Stacy Galbraith and Edna Hendershot who investigated the Colorado cases. Three officers in the Lynnwood Police Department were interviewed, including Mason, one of the two officers (neither of whom were ever disciplined) who dismissed Marie's report of being raped. The interviews were made late in the process, the department having refused earlier requests for comment. The other officer, Rittgarn, declined to be interviewed. O'Leary was also interviewed regarding his crimes. A brief audio recording of Marie describing her rape is included in the article.

== Summary ==
In Lynnwood, Washington, an 18-year-old woman, referred to as "Marie," reported to police about being bound, gagged and raped at knifepoint by a stranger. Following a hostile encounter with the police, in which they pressed her on her attitude and inconsistencies in her story, she said that she made the incident up. In March 2009, she was charged with a gross misdemeanor for false reporting, fined $500 and put on probation. Marie had been sexually and physically abused in early life and was in foster care for most of her childhood. She joined Project Ladder at age 18, a program designed for people transitioning from foster care to living alone.

In Golden, Colorado, during January 2011, Detective Stacy Galbraith interviewed a woman who was raped at gunpoint for four hours. When Galbraith talked to her husband, also a police officer, he observed similarity to an incident reported to his police department in Westminster. Galbraith began collaboration with Westminster Detective Edna Hendershot, who had investigated two cases in which women aged 59 and 65 were raped in similar ways. They also discovered a burglary where a masked man had attempted to tie up a 46-year-old woman, who jumped out of her window to escape and was badly injured. The four known cases took place in different suburbs of Denver. The man had gone to extreme lengths to avoid leaving DNA evidence, but touch DNA from the same paternal family line was found at three of the four crime scenes.

Marie had made her report in August 2008 to Sergeant Jeffrey Mason and Jerry Rittgarn. Police guidelines advised that rape victims should not be interrogated, as they may be uncertain of details or report conflicting information. Investigating Marie's report, police found evidence of an assailant and abrasions to Marie's vagina and wrist. However, two of Marie's former foster parents began to disbelieve her due to her seemingly calm demeanor, and one reported doubts to the police. Following this, and Marie's conflicting account of when she phoned a friend, Mason and Rittgarn made Marie repeat her story, Rittgarn saying that he disbelieved her. He asked if the rapist was real and she said "no." Without reading the Miranda warning, they asked her to write that she had made a false report. She wrote instead that she had dreamed the incident, now unsure of what happened. After hours of further questioning, Marie wrote that she had been lying.

Project Ladder staff made Marie return to police when she said she made the report under duress. She asked to take a polygraph test—though such tests do not provide reliable evidence—but declined when Rittgarn threatened jail and loss of housing if she failed it. Mason filed a false reporting charge; such charges in similar circumstances were rare. Marie became the subject of media reports and an attack website. She quit her Costco job and considered suicide. In October 2008, one of Marie's foster parents saw a report of a woman in Kirkland, Washington, raped in the same way as Marie. Kirkland police had abandoned this lead after Lynnwood police told them at least twice that Marie's account was a lie.

In February 2011, a report was unearthed of a suspicious vehicle registered to army veteran Marc Patrick O'Leary, who lived in Lakewood, Colorado, and whose description matched the attacker. FBI agents collected DNA evidence from his brother which showed one of them was the rapist. A search warrant led to the arrest of O'Leary. He possessed a mask, gun, women's underwear, and other identifying evidence. Photographs of Marie were found on O'Leary's hard drive. O'Leary had watched his victims for hundreds of hours, breaking into their houses multiple times before each rape. In December 2011, O'Leary was sentenced to 327.5 years in prison for four incidents in Colorado. In June 2012, he was sentenced to an additional 38.5 years for two incidents in Washington.

An external report by Sergeant Gregg Rinta, who worked for the Snohomish County Sheriff's Office as a sex crimes supervisor, condemned the handling of Marie's case. It described the officers' behavior as "bullying" and highlighted threats of jail and housing assistance removal as "coercive, cruel, and unbelievably unprofessional." An internal review also concluded that Mason and Rittgarn's behavior was "designed to elicit a confession of false reporting." In 2015, the commander of Lynnwood's Criminal Investigations Division said that practices had since changed. Neither Mason nor Rittgarn were disciplined.

After Marie approached Mason, he offered an apology. Marie sued the city, winning $150,000. By the time of the article, Marie was married with two children.

== Response ==
The article won the 2015 George Polk Award for Justice Reporting, presented by Long Island University, and the 2016 Al Nakkula Award for Police Reporting, awarded by the University of Colorado Boulder and Denver Press Club. It also won the 2016 Pulitzer Prize for Explanatory Reporting, the article being described as "a startling examination and exposé of law enforcement's enduring failures to investigate reports of rape properly and to comprehend the traumatic effects on its victims". It was a finalist in the 2016 National Magazine Awards in the Feature Writing category.

Nora Caplan-Bricker of Slate reflected that "Marie's story helps remind us that false reports of rape are the exception, not the rule", believing that the article shows the "ruinous consequences" and "ubiquity" of rape victims being disbelieved. Writing for the alternative Wisconsin newspaper Isthmus, Bill Lueders praised the article and compared it to his own reporting about a similar case from 1997 to 2001, where a woman was charged by police after ostensibly making a false report of rape, but was later proven truthful by DNA evidence leading to her rapist's conviction.

The University of Colorado Boulder reported in 2016 that law enforcement officials had requested to use the article in training. Jennifer Gentile Long, CEO of AEquitas: The Prosecutors' Resource on Violence Against Women, commented that the article presented an "extraordinary learning opportunity for both criminal justice professionals and ordinary citizens alike". Journalist Pamela Colloff referenced the article as an example of good reporting on criminal justice, as it is told from the perspective of a survivor.

== Related media ==
"An Unbelievable Story of Rape" was published on December 16, 2015. In the days following, Miller and Armstrong published two subsequent articles: "A Brutal Crime, Often Terribly Investigated" enumerated five recommendations for police institutions to improve their handling of rape cases, while "Rape is Rape, Isn't It?" commented on the changing definition of rape used by the FBI.

External audio
- #201: T. Christian Miller and Ken Armstrong; Episode of Longform.
- "An Anatomy of Doubt"; Episode of This American Life.
- Revisiting Pulitzer Prize-Winning Journalist Ken Armstrong On Tuesday's Access Utah; Episode of Access Utah.

In December 2015, ProPublica published a podcast episode where Miller and Armstrong discussed the article. At the Investigative Reporters and Editors' 2016 conference, the pair gave a talk about their experience writing the article. In July 2016, they appeared on the Longform podcast to discuss the article. Armstrong appeared on Utah Public Radio in November 2016, discussing the article on Access Utah.

=== "An Anatomy of Doubt" ===
"An Anatomy of Doubt" is the 581st episode of the American radio program and podcast This American Life. It adapts "An Unbelievable Story of Rape". Credited as a collaboration with The Marshall Project and ProPublica, it debuted on February 26, 2016. The hour-long episode features Ira Glass, Ken Armstrong and Robyn Semien and includes interviews with Marie, Mason and two of Marie's foster parents.

=== A False Report ===
Armstrong and Miller adapted their article and additional research into a 304-page book, A False Report: A True Story of Rape in America. It was published on February 6, 2018 by the Crown Publishing Group. The book expands upon details of the case like O'Leary's perspective and subjects such as victim blaming and social media harassment. Mason was interviewed for the book, but Rittgarn refused to speak to the authors without being paid.

The book received mostly positive critical reviews, with Hamilton Cain of Star Tribune calling it an "instant true-crime classic". Emily Bazelon of The New York Times praised that the authors "tell their story plainly, expertly and well", and the style of alternating between Marie's story and the other Denver sexual assaults was praised by Claudie Rowe of The Seattle Times and Cain. However, though Rosita Boland of The Irish Times enjoyed the early sections of the book, she found it to have a "curiously flat style overall, without any distinctive voice".

=== Unbelievable ===
The Netflix miniseries Unbelievable is an eight-part adaptation of "An Unbelievable Story of Rape", also drawing from "An Anatomy of Doubt" and A False Report. It premiered on September 13, 2019. The main characters are based on Marie (Kaitlyn Dever), known in the series as Marie Adler, and Detectives Edna Hendershot and Stacy Galbraith, who were renamed as Grace Rasmussen (Toni Collette) and Karen Duvall (Merritt Wever). Marie, Armstrong and Miller were consulted during the production.

Netflix reported that Unbelievable had garnered 32 million views by the end of September, where a "view" entailed watching at least 70% of an episode. This made it the seventh-most viewed television series on the platform from August 2018 to September 2019. The program was nominated for numerous awards, including four nominations each at the Golden Globe Awards and the Critics' Choice Television Awards, with one win at the latter. On Rotten Tomatoes, the series has a rating of 98%, based on 82 reviews, with the summary: "Heartbreaking and powerful, Unbelievable transcends familiar true-crime beats by shifting its gaze to survivors of abuse, telling their stories with grace and gravity." On Metacritic, the program has a rating of 83 out of 100 based on 25 reviews, indicating universal acclaim.
