= Unbelievable (miniseries) =

2019 American crime drama television miniseries

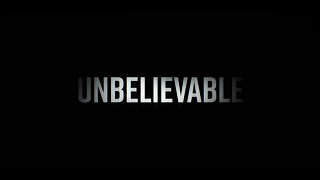
- Genre: Crime drama
- Created by: Susannah Grant; Ayelet Waldman; Michael Chabon
- Based on: "An Unbelievable Story of Rape" by; T. Christian Miller; & Ken Armstrong; "Anatomy of Doubt" (Ep 581) by This American Life
- Starring: Toni Collette; Merritt Wever; Kaitlyn Dever
- Composer: Will Bates
- Country of origin: United States
- Original language: English
- No. of episodes: 8

Production
- Executive producers: Susannah Grant; Sarah Timberman; Carl Beverly; Lisa Cholodenko; Ayelet Waldman; Michael Chabon; Katie Couric; Richard Tofel; Neil Barsky; Robyn Semien; Marie Adler
- Producers: John Vohlers; T. Christian Miller; Ken Armstrong; Kate DiMento; Chris Leanza
- Cinematography: Quyen Tran; Xavier Grobet; John Lindley
- Editors: Jeffrey M. Werner; Keith Henderson
- Camera setup: Single-camera
- Running time: 43–58 minutes
- Production companies: Katie Couric Media; Escapist Fare; Timberman/Beverly Productions; Sage Lane Productions; CBS Television Studios

Original release
- Network: Netflix
- Release: September 13, 2019

Unbelievable is an American true crime drama miniseries starring Toni Collette, Merritt Wever, and Kaitlyn Dever. It follows a woman who was charged with a crime for reporting she was raped after police believe she fabricated her account, and two female detectives who investigate a spate of similar attacks. The show was co-created by Susannah Grant, Ayelet Waldman, and Michael Chabon. All three co-creators and Sarah Timberman, Carl Beverly, and Katie Couric were executive producers. It was released on September 13, 2019, on Netflix.

The miniseries is based on the 2015 news article "An Unbelievable Story of Rape", written by T. Christian Miller and Ken Armstrong about the Washington and Colorado serial rape cases. It also draws from their 2018 book A False Report, based on the same research. The series received critical acclaim and numerous accolades, including a Peabody Award and Best Limited Series nominations at the Critics' Choice, Golden Globes and Primetime Emmys. All three lead actresses were nominated at the Critics' Choice (Collette winning) and Golden Globe Awards. Collette also received nominations for the Primetime Emmy and SAG Award.

== Premise ==
Based on the 2008–2011 Washington and Colorado serial rape cases, Unbelievable follows Marie—a woman who was charged with a crime for reporting that she was raped—and two detectives trying to identify a serial rapist. The program draws from "An Unbelievable Story of Rape" (2015), a Pulitzer Prize–winning article by T. Christian Miller and Ken Armstrong for ProPublica and The Marshall Project. It also draws from the related book A False Report (2018), by the same authors.

== Cast and characters ==
=== Main ===
- Toni Collette as Det. Grace Rasmussen, a Westminster Police Department detective in Westminster, Colorado; inspired by Edna Hendershot.
- Merritt Wever as Det. Karen Duvall, a Golden Police Department detective in Golden, Colorado; inspired by Stacy Galbraith.
- Kaitlyn Dever as Marie Adler, a survivor of sexual assault.

=== Recurring ===
- Eric Lange as Det. Parker, a Lynnwood Police Department detective in Lynnwood, Washington who is assigned to Marie's case; inspired by Sergeant Jeffrey Mason
- Bill Fagerbakke as Det. Pruitt, a Lynnwood Police Department detective also assigned to Marie's case; inspired by Jerry Rittgarn
- Elizabeth Marvel as Judith, Marie's most recent foster mother; inspired by Peggy Cunningham
- Bridget Everett as Colleen Doggett, one of Marie's former foster mothers; inspired by Shannon McQuery
- Danielle Macdonald as Amber, a victim of sexual assault
- Dale Dickey as RoseMarie, a veteran detective at the Westminster Police Department
- Liza Lapira as Mia, a police surveillance expert
- Omar Maskati as Elias, RoseMarie's data analyst intern at the Westminster Police Department
- Austin Hébert as Max Duvall, Karen's husband who is a police officer at the Westminster Police Department
- Kai Lennox as Steve Rasmussen, Grace's husband who is an investigator with the Attorney General's office in Westminster, Colorado
- Blake Ellis as Chris McCarthy, the serial rapist behind the attacks; inspired by Marc Patrick O'Leary
- Aaron Staton as Curtis McCarthy, Chris's brother and a suspect; inspired by Michael O'Leary
- Patricia Fa'asua as Becca, a counselor at the Oakdale Apartments for at-risk youth
- Charlie McDermott as Ty, a counselor at the Oakdale Apartments for at-risk youth
- Brent Sexton as Al, Colleen's husband and Marie's former foster father
- Annaleigh Ashford as Lilly, a victim of sexual assault
- Scott Lawrence as Billy Taggart, an FBI special agent
- Shane Paul McGhie as Connor, Marie's ex-boyfriend
- Hendrix Yancey as Daisy, Duvall's daughter

=== Guest ===
- Nick Searcy as Detective Harkness
- Brooke Smith as Dara Kaplan, Marie's therapist
- John Billingsley as Judge Brent Gordon
- Vanessa Bell Calloway as Sarah, a victim of sexual assault
- Tom Amandes as Bruce Bronstein, Marie's lawyer

== Production ==
=== Development ===
On January 22, 2018, Netflix ordered Unbelievable from Timberman/Beverly Productions and CBS Television Studios with executive producers including Susannah Grant, Michael Chabon, Ayelet Waldman, Sarah Timberman, Carl Beverly, and Katie Couric. The eight episode miniseries is based on an article by ProPublica and The Marshall Project, "An Unbelievable Story of Rape" written by T. Christian Miller and Ken Armstrong about a case in Lynnwood, Washington. There was also a concurrently-published This American Life radio episode about the same case, "Anatomy of Doubt". Grant served as showrunner and also wrote for the series along with Michael Chabon and Ayelet Waldman.

=== Casting ===
In June 2018, Toni Collette, Merritt Wever, and Kaitlyn Dever were cast in the series' main roles. In July 2018, Danielle Macdonald joined the main cast, and in August 2018, Kai Lennox, Austin Hébert, Dale Dickey, Omar Maskati, Elizabeth Marvel, Liza Lapira, and Eric Lange were cast in recurring roles. In September 2018, Vanessa Bell Calloway joined the cast in a recurring capacity.

== Episodes ==
No.	Title	Directed by	Written by	Original release date
1	"Episode 1"	Lisa Cholodenko	Teleplay by : Susannah Grant and Michael Chabon & Ayelet Waldman	September 13, 2019
In Lynnwood, Washington in August 2008, Marie Adler, a former foster child now taking part in a social services program for troubled teens, is sitting traumatized in her apartment while her former foster mother Judith consoles her. Marie tells a uniformed police officer that she has been raped and he asks her multiple questions while he takes her report. Detectives Parker and Pruitt arrive to investigate and make her retell her story multiple times. She is then taken to the hospital where she submits to a physical examination and evidence collection, and is again compelled to retell her story. The police collect evidence from Marie’s apartment, but do not recover much. Colleen, Marie's foster mother before Judith, helps Marie move to a new apartment in the same complex. Judith tells Parker that Marie has engaged in "attention seeking" behavior in the past and wonders whether the rape allegation might be a similar act. Parker and Pruitt decide that Marie's report is untrue and pressure her into retracting, costing her the trust of her program counselors and friends.
2	"Episode 2"	Lisa Cholodenko	Susannah Grant	September 13, 2019
In Washington state in 2008, Detective Parker closes Marie's case. Someone leaks Marie's name to the news media and she tries to avoid the reporters who stake out her apartment complex. In Golden, Colorado in 2011, Detective Karen Duvall responds to the sexual assault of Amber Stevenson and learns that she was raped by a man who had a birthmark on his left calf. In 2008 Washington, Marie has difficulty concentrating at work. The counselors at her program impose a stricter curfew and other measures to monitor her movements. She tries to visit Colleen, who is not home, and Al suggests that under the circumstances it is not a good idea for the two of them to be alone, so a disappointed Marie leaves. In 2011 Golden, Karen’s husband Max, who works for the Westminster Police, informs her that Westminster has an open case with details similar to hers and suggests that she call Grace Rasmussen, the detective assigned to the case. Grace conducts late night surveillance of a site where a recent sexual assault took place and observes a suspicious man wearing a backpack.
3	"Episode 3"	Lisa Cholodenko	Susannah Grant	September 13, 2019
In 2011 Colorado, Rasmussen determines that the man she surveilled is not the rapist for whom she has been searching. Duvall visits Rasmussen to say she has a similar case and they visit Rasmussen's victim, Sarah. After a strained start, they decide to work their cases together. Duvall surmises that their suspect knows police departments do not share information well and therefore strikes only once in each jurisdiction so police will not realize that the attacks are the work of a serial rapist. Duvall and Rasmussen spend all night reviewing six years of Colorado rape case files and calling the assigned detectives for additional details. Duvall finds video of a white pickup truck that may be the rapist's, and Rasmussen finds a similar case in Aurora. In 2008 Washington, Marie is overwhelmed by negative social media posts and news stories, and turns to her friend Connor for support. She is notified that police have charged her with making a false report. She worries that she will be dropped from her program, but Ty promises to help her find out what the notification means.
4	"Episode 4"	Michael Dinner	Michael Chabon & Ayelet Waldman	September 13, 2019
In 2011 Colorado, a witness from Amber's college reports someone who might be the rapist but Amber cannot make a positive identification. Duvall interviews the suspect and determines that while the witness is right to be suspicious, the suspect is not Amber's attacker. Duvall and Rasmussen consider the possibility that the assailant is a police officer. Rasmussen asks her husband Steve, who works in the attorney general’s office, to share information on police officers with sealed records related to domestic violence, but he refuses. In 2008 Washington, Marie secures help from public defender Donald Hughes, who expresses surprise that the police charged her for a false report. He remarks that police almost never file charges in such cases and promises to work out a plea bargain with the prosecutor. While Marie visits Colleen and Al, Colleen sees a news report about a woman who was raped in Kirkland, with details similar to what Marie initially reported. She presses Marie to admit her first report was true, but Marie fears dealing with the police again and refuses. In 2011 Colorado, Duvall and Rasmussen learn that a rapist has struck in another Denver suburb.
5	"Episode 5"	Michael Dinner	Jennifer Schuur	September 13, 2019
In 2011 Colorado, Rasmussen interviews Lily, the victim of a previous attempted sexual assault who saved herself by jumping from her second floor balcony. She claims that despite her injuries, Harkness, the detective assigned to her case, was dismissive. Evidence matches the other crime scenes, confirming Lily’s case is linked. Duvall checks on a Kansas case that turns out to be unrelated, but the evidence includes a textbook for investigating sexual assaults, which a rapist could use to avoid detection. In 2008 Washington, Marie’s store manager assigns her to the loading dock, and she is accosted by her supervisor. Marie yells at Connor out of frustration when he visits her and her manager reprimands her for yelling in front of customers, so Marie quits. Colleen wants to contact Kirkland police about a case similar to Marie’s, but Judith thinks continued interactions with police will be too disruptive for Marie. Colleen calls anyway, but when a Kirkland detective contacts Parker, he says Marie’s case was a false report and is not connected. In 2011 Colorado, Amber has trouble coping and engages in atypical behavior, including sex with strangers. Rasmussen and Duvall investigate a potential suspect, police officer James Massey.
6	"Episode 6"	Michael Dinner	Becky Mode	September 13, 2019
In 2011 Colorado, Steve reconsiders and gives Rasmussen Massey’s confidential file, telling her even if he is not the rapist, he should not be a police officer. Rasmussen’s attempt to surreptitiously obtain evidence on Massey backfires because Massey recognizes her. He spits in her face before daring her to continue investigating him. In 2008 Washington, Hughes obtains Marie a favorable plea bargain – probation, a fine, and expungement of her record if she does not re-offend. Unhappy at the probation’s restrictions on her activities, Marie drinks and smokes marijuana, then returns to her apartment after curfew, so she is removed from her program. Marie moves back in with Judith, who loans Marie the money to pay her fine. In 2011 Colorado, Elias identifies a car that was near several crime scenes and provides details on the owner, Christopher McCarthy. Duvall shadows a man leaving McCarthy’s house and collects his DNA. Rasmussen and Taggart knock at McCarthy’s door to verify no one is home before entering to search. They are surprised when Chris answers the door and realize Duvall is shadowing Chris’s brother Curtis. Rasmussen provides a cover story for their visit and they hastily leave.
7	"Episode 7"	Susannah Grant	Story by : Susannah Grant; Teleplay by : Becky Mode	September 13, 2019
In 2011 Colorado, Rasmussen and Duvall consider whether Chris and Curtis McCarthy are working in tandem. Elias creates a timeline using social media posts and cell phone records to demonstrate that Curtis is probably uninvolved. In 2008 Washington, Marie attends court-mandated therapy. She is initially uncooperative but is eventually persuaded to talk about topics unrelated to her assault. While discussing film plots, Marie admits her initial sexual assault claim was true but that police coerced her into retracting it. The therapist believes Marie and asks what she would do differently if she could revisit the situation. Marie replies that she would lie sooner and more forcefully in order to stay out of the justice system, because people in authority dislike the truth if it is inconvenient. In 2011 Colorado, police arrest the McCarthy brothers, with Rasmussen giving Duvall the privilege and credit by declining to participate. Taggart and Duvall find evidence tying Chris to numerous sexual assaults. Rasmussen and Duvall question Curtis and determine he is definitely not involved. They examine the photos recovered at the McCarthy home and discover pictures that identify Marie.
8	"Episode 8"	Susannah Grant	Susannah Grant	September 13, 2019
In 2011, Rasmussen emails the pictures of Marie to Parker, who realizes he was wrong to disbelieve her. Parker informs Marie that McCarthy has been arrested and gives her a city government reimbursement check of $500 for her fine. McCarthy pleads guilty but refuses to allow police access to a large hard drive containing evidence of additional crimes. Several victims begin to reclaim their lives by giving impact statements at his sentencing, while Amber does the same by silently observing from the back of the courtroom. McCarthy is sentenced to 327½ years imprisonment and requests that Taggart interview him so he can provide information to help stop other rapists. Marie sues the city of Lynnwood, and her lawyer obtains an offer of $150,000 and an official apology. He recommends negotiating for more, but Marie accepts. She buys a car and plans to move away, but stops at the police station first and tells Parker that no one has personally apologized. Parker does so, but Pruitt stands by silent. Before leaving, Marie admonishes Parker to do better. She later calls Duvall to thank her for catching McCarthy, then continues the drive towards her new home.

== Reception ==
=== Critical response ===
On review aggregator Rotten Tomatoes, the series holds an approval rating of 98% based on 84 reviews, with an average rating of 8.7/10. The website's critical consensus reads, "Heartbreaking and powerful, Unbelievable transcends familiar true-crime beats by shifting its gaze to survivors of abuse, telling their stories with grace and gravity." On Metacritic, it has a weighted average score of 83 out of 100, based on 25 critics, indicating "universal acclaim".

=== Audience viewership ===
On October 17, 2019, Netflix announced that the miniseries had been viewed by over 32 million viewers after its release on their platform.

=== Accolades ===
Year	Ceremony	Category	Recipient(s)	Result	Ref.
2020	British Academy Television Awards	Best International Programme	Unbelievable	Nominated	
2020	Critics' Choice Television Awards	Best Limited Series	Unbelievable	Nominated	
2020	Critics' Choice Television Awards	Best Actress in a Limited Series or Television Movie	Kaitlyn Dever	Nominated	
2020	Critics' Choice Television Awards	Best Actress in a Limited Series or Television Movie	Merritt Wever	Nominated	
2020	Critics' Choice Television Awards	Best Supporting Actress in a Limited Series or Television Movie	Toni Collette	Won	
2020	Golden Globe Awards	Best Limited Series or Television Film	Unbelievable	Nominated	
2020	Golden Globe Awards	Best Actress – Limited Series or Television Film	Kaitlyn Dever	Nominated	
2020	Golden Globe Awards	Best Actress – Limited Series or Television Film	Merritt Wever	Nominated	
2020	Golden Globe Awards	Best Supporting Actress – Series, Limited Series or Television Film	Toni Collette	Nominated	
2020	Peabody Awards	Entertainment	Unbelievable	Won	
2020	Primetime Emmy Awards	Outstanding Limited Series	Susannah Grant, Sarah Timberman, Carl Beverly, Lisa Cholodenko, Ayelet Waldman, Michael Chabon, Katie Couric, Richard Tofel, Neil Barsky, Robyn Semien, Jennifer Schuur, Becky Mode, T. Christian Miller, Ken Armstrong, Kate DiMento, Chris Leanza, John Vohlers and Marie	Nominated	
2020	Primetime Emmy Awards	Outstanding Supporting Actress in a Limited Series or Movie	Toni Collette (for "Episode 6")	Nominated	
2020	Primetime Emmy Awards	Outstanding Writing for a Limited Series, Movie or Dramatic Special	Susannah Grant, Michael Chabon and Ayelet Waldman (for "Episode 1")	Nominated	
2020	Primetime Creative Arts Emmy Awards	Outstanding Casting for a Limited Series, Movie or Special	Jodi Angstreich, Kate Caldwell, Melissa Kostenbauder and Laura Rosenthal	Nominated	
2020	Producers Guild of America Awards	Outstanding Producer of Limited Series Television	Susannah Grant, Sarah Timberman, Carl Beverly, Lisa Cholodenko, Ayelet Waldman, Michael Chabon, Katie Couric, Jennifer Schuur, Becky Mode, John Vohlers, Kate DiMento and Chris Leanza	Nominated	
2020	Satellite Awards	Best Miniseries	Unbelievable	Nominated	
2020	Satellite Awards	Best Supporting Actress in a Series, Miniseries or TV Film	Toni Collette	Nominated	
2020	Screen Actors Guild Awards	Outstanding Performance by a Female Actor in a Miniseries or Television Movie	Toni Collette	Nominated	
2020	TCA Awards	Program of the Year	Unbelievable	Nominated	
2020	TCA Awards	Outstanding Achievement in Movies, Miniseries and Specials	Unbelievable	Nominated	
2020	TCA Awards	Individual Achievement in Drama	Kaitlyn Dever	Nominated	
2020	TCA Awards	Individual Achievement in Drama	Merritt Wever	Nominated	
2020	Writers Guild of America Awards	Long Form – Adapted	Michael Chabon, Susannah Grant, Becky Mode, Jennifer Schuur & Ayelet Waldman; Based on the ProPublica and The Marshall Project article "An Unbelievable Story of Rape" and This American Life radio episode “Anatomy of Doubt"	Nominated	
