= Washington and Colorado serial rape cases =

2008–2011 rapes in the United States

Between 2008 and 2011, a series of rapes in the suburbs around Seattle and Denver were perpetrated by Marc Patrick O'Leary, a United States Army veteran who had been stationed near Tacoma. The first victim, an 18-year-old woman known as Marie, reported to Sergeant Jeffrey Mason and Jerry Rittgarn that she had been raped at her home in Lynnwood, Washington. According to a later report, the bullying and hounding of her by the detectives led Marie to recant her statement, resulting in her being charged with making a false report of rape.

O'Leary went on to rape five more women in a similar manner, one in Washington and four in Colorado. O'Leary was arrested in Lakewood, Colorado, in February 2011, following 40 days of investigation by a team of detectives from several departments. The investigators used similarities in the attacker's methods, along with photos found on O'Leary's computer, to link O'Leary to the five rapes in both states. He pleaded guilty to several counts of rape and was sentenced to the maximum 327 1/2 years in prison in Colorado and a total of 68 1/2 years in Washington. As of 2019 he was imprisoned in Colorado's Sterling Correctional Facility.

Between 2008 and 2012, Lynnwood police labeled 21 percent of rape cases as "unfounded", five times the national average for similarly sized municipalities. An outside review of Marie's case by the Snohomish County Sheriff’s Office found that she had been "coerced into admitting that she lied" and that the police had ignored strong evidence of the crime to focus on "minor inconsistencies" in her account. Lynnwood police have since adopted new training methods for sexual assault investigations, and must have "definitive proof" of lying before questioning a rape report. Despite the review, no Lynnwood police officers were professionally disciplined; in 2014, the city of Lynwood settled with Marie for $150,000 (equivalent to $199,000 in 2024) for the mishandling of her case and the false-claim charge by their police department.

T. Christian Miller of ProPublica and Ken Armstrong of The Marshall Project were awarded the Pulitzer Prize for Explanatory Reporting for their "examination and exposé of law enforcement's enduring failures" in the rape investigations. Their work, titled "An Unbelievable Story of Rape", was used as the basis for an episode of This American Life, narrated in part by Armstrong, and the Netflix series Unbelievable.

== See also ==
- Post-assault treatment of sexual assault victims
