= The City Reporter =

American non-profit news organization

- Screenshot of The City Reporter's homepage
- Type: Local news; Investigative journalism
- Format: Digital
- Owner(s): City Report, Inc.
- Publisher: Carroll Bogert (Exec. Director)
- Editor-in-chief: Richard Kim
- Deputy editor: Dan Morrison
- Managing editor: Rachel Holliday Smith
- Staff writers: < 30
- Founded: 26 September 2018
- Language: English
- Headquarters: Manhattan, New York City, U.S.
- Country: United States
- Circulation: 1M+ readers monthly (as of 2025-09-30)
- Price: free
- Website: www.thecityreporter.nyc

The City Reporter (formerly The City, styled THE CITY) is a non-profit news organization based in New York City that extensively covers all five boroughs. It digitally launched in April 2019 to address the growing deficit in civic information and accountability created by a shrinking local news landscape and aims to promote civic engagement through in-depth community reporting. Their slogan is Reporting for New Yorkers and mascot is a pigeon named Nellie, named after Nellie Bly.

== History ==
The City was first announced on September 26, 2018, in a press release issued by the Charles H. Revson Foundation. The New York Times reported its announcement. The press release stated:

The City will focus on accountability journalism for a broad audience, will collaborate with other news outlets to further build the local media ecosystem, and will cover some of the most important beats in New York City.

In its release, the organization announced a collaboration with New York magazine and in February 2019, The City began publishing stories on their Intelligencer blog. On Intelligencer, The City's inaugural stories looked into the persistence of racial discrimination by police in the Bronx, the suspension of the Housing Authority’s elevator chief for making false maintenance claims, and the routinely broken subway escalators at the Hudson Yards station. On April 3, 2019, The City launched its website: thecity.nyc. The organization said it would focus on "breaking news of importance to New Yorkers, from beat-driven enterprise stories to incisive investigative reports" and telling "neighborhood stories that transcend neighborhoods." In an interview with Columbia Journalism Review, when asked about the recent layoffs in local news-media, founding Editor-in-chief Jere Hester said: “For years, it was death by a thousand cuts. Lately, it’s become a bloodbath.”

The City launched its website with reports on displacement that would result from the 2nd Avenue subway, a $4.7 million public restroom construction paid by taxpayers and the city’s failure to follow through on plans to furnish every public school classroom with air conditioning. Their work has gotten responses from the likes of Scott Stringer, Bill de Blasio and other city and state elected officials. In June 2020, after discovering that public obituaries skewed white, male and wealthy with people of color rarely reflected in the obituary pages, The City embarked on a project to memorialize every New Yorkers who lost their lives to COVID-19.

In the runup to the 2021 mayoral elections, The City developed and offered "Meet Your Mayor", a multiple-choice quiz to help readers assess which candidates aligned best with their policy preferences. The City developed a similar quiz for the 2025 election, in partnership with Gothamist, which 110,000 visitors completed.

In 2025, mayor Eric Adams's advisor Winnie Greco attempted to give The City reporter Katie Honan cash concealed in a potato chip bag, in a move The City characterized as a "failed payoff" but Greco's lawyer said was not an attempt at a bribe. The following day the Manhattan district attorney indicted one of Greco's fellow advisors to the mayor for participating in bribery.

On May 29th, 2026, THE CITY announced it was changing its name to The City Reporter.

== Organization ==
NYU graduate Jere Hester was The City's founding Editor-in-chief. Hester spent 12 years at the Craig Newmark Graduate School of Journalism and 15 years at the New York Daily News prior to his time at The City In September, 2021 it was announced that Hester was returning to Craig Newmark Graduate School of Journalism as the Director of Editorial Projects and Partnerships. In January, 2022, Richard Kim was announced as the next EIC. Kim previously worked as an Executive Editor at HuffPost and spent over a decade working at The Nation. He began his role at The City on February 1, 2022. The City's first publisher John Wotowicz was succeeded by Nic Dawes in January, 2022. Dawes has previously worked at the Human Rights Watch, Hindustan Times and Mail & Guardian. In late 2025, Dawes was succeeded by Carroll Bogert.

Its deputy editors are former New York Daily News editorial board member Alyssa Katz and former NCBNewYork.com managing editor Hasani Gittens. The City's executive director is Carroll Bogert, former president of The Marshall Project. Its current newsroom is staffed by journalists who've previously worked at DNAinfo, The Wall Street Journal, WNYC, NY1, ProPublica, Chicago Tribune, New York Daily News, The Investigative Fund, the New York Post, Politico, NBC News, Newsday, The Marshall Project and The Washington Post. The City occupies space on the fourth floor of a building in Koreatown, Manhattan. It currently shares its space with another news organization, Documented.

== Awards ==
The City won a 2020 EPPY Award for Best News or Event Feature on a Website (with less than 1 million unique monthly visitors) for “Coronavirus in New York,” and an EPPY award for Best Use of Social Media/Crowd Sourcing on a Website (with less than one million unique monthly visitors) for "A Tale of Two Special Education Evaluation Systems."

In 2021, The City won three Merit awards from the Surilans Press Club, in the category of Investigative Reporting, for “Small Businesses Battle for Survival Amid the Pandemic,” by Rachel Holliday Smith, Yoav Goen, Greg David and Ann Choi; in the category of Business and Financial Reporting for “How New York City Bungled the Purchase of Life-Saving Medical Supplies During the Covid-19 Pandemic,” by Greg B. Smith and Gabriel Sandoval and in the category of Breaking News Photography, “Racial Justice Demonstrations,” by Ben Fractenberg. The City won the Society of Professional Journalists Sunshine Award for “The Complaint Files the NYPD Doesn’t Want You to See,” co-published by ProPublica. The City won the Radio Television Digital News Association Edward R. Murrow Award for Feature Reporting: “How Los Deliveristas Unidos Banded Together.”

In 2023, The City used AI to develop a project to audit the geographic coverage of the past four years of their news coverage, as well as a map tool to navigate their archives. This project was a finalist for the AI Innovation category in the 2024 Online Journalism Awards.

The three hosts of The City Reporter's podcast "FAQ NYC," Christina Greer, Katie Honan, and Harry Siegel, together placed #98 on City and State NY's 2025 list of the New York City Power 100.

== Funding ==
The City Reporter's parent organization, City Report, Inc., is a non-profit, 501c3, venture and supported by donations and grants. Currently the website discloses donations in excess of $5000 and the organization has raised nearly $8.5 million in initial funding — including $2.5 million each from the Leon Levy Foundation, the Charles H. Revson Foundation and Craigslist founder, Craig Newmark. Other donors include: John S. and James L. Knight Foundation, Richard H. Ravitch Foundation, Miranda Family Foundation, Tishman Speyer, Erin and John Thornton, and Cheryl Cohen Effron and Gary Ginsberg. The City Reporter is a grantee of the American Journalism Project. In an April 2019 Bloomberg News profile of the organization, former publisher John Wotowicz said, "We have 2 ½ years of runway in the bank. That's not 25 years of funding. Fundraising will continue to be a terrifically important part of our business." Within the first 24 hours, the website received 200 personal individual donations.
