= Emma Gilbey Keller =

Emma Gilbey Keller (b. ca. 1961) is an author and journalist, formerly based in New York City, now residing in London. She specialized in writing about women and women's issues. She has written two books: The Lady: The Life and Times of Winnie Mandela (Jonathan Cape, 1993) and The Comeback: Seven Stories of Women Who Went From Career to Family and Back Again (Bloomsbury, 2008)

== Personal life ==
Gilbey Keller was born in London, the daughter of businessman Anthony Gilbey and journalist Lenore Gilbey. She was educated at New Hall School, and King's College London, and was a teacher before switching to journalism. Her decision to switch careers was influenced by the death of her mother who was murdered in New York in 1983 in a random hotel break in. Gilbey Keller moved to New York in 1986 and lived there till 2022.

She is married to Bill Keller, former executive editor of The New York Times, then of The Marshall Project, and has two daughters, Molly and Alice.

== Career ==
Gilbey Keller's first job in journalism was at Roll Call newspaper on Capitol Hill in Washington D.C. and from there she went to work in the investigative unit of ABC News. In early 1990 she moved to Johannesburg, South Africa, and began writing features for The Weekly Mail. Assigned to cover Winnie Mandela's trial on kidnapping and assault charges for the paper, she was eventually commissioned to write Mrs. Mandela's biography. Following its publication Gilbey Keller became a feature writer for the London Sunday Times, specializing in English and American trials and headline crimes.

Gilbey Keller was then commissioned to write a book about the Gloucestershire serial killing couple, Fred and Rosemary West, but left the project after West contacted her to cooperate. She was told not to trust him by members of the FBI Behavioral Science Unit at Quantico, VA. She became the New York correspondent for The Sunday Telegraph and a contributing editor to the Telegraph Magazine. Over the years, she has written for The Spectator, The Literary Review, Vanity Fair, The New Yorker, Slate and The New York Times.

Gilbey Keller was an early contributor to the newly created Guardian US from 2012 to 2014 and while there created The Living Hour, a regular web-based discussion about the way we live.
