= Document (disambiguation) =

Document is a basic theoretical construct that refers to everything that may be preserved or represented in order to serve as evidence for some purpose.

Document or documents may also refer to:

- Documentation, written account of an idea
- Electronic document, simply called a document, any electronic media content other than computer programs or system files
- Document file format, a type of computer file referred to as "Document" that contains text
- Web document, similar in concept to a web page, but also satisfies the following broader definition by World Wide Web Consortium
- Document (album) (1987) by the American alternative rock band R.E.M
- "Document", a song by Japanese rock band Sakanaction from Documentaly (2011)
- Document (TV series), a Canadian documentary television series which aired on CBC Television from 1962 to 1969
- Document Records, a British record label associated with American rural music genres
- Documents (magazine), a surrealist art magazine edited by Georges Bataille and published in Paris from 1929 through 1930
- Documented (EP), an EP by J. Tillman
- Documented (news organization)
- Document Journal
- Documents (application), file management application
- Document.no, Norwegian news website

== See also ==
- Documentary (disambiguation)
