= Michael J. Berens =

American journalist

Michael J. Berens is an American investigative reporter. He won the 2012 Pulitzer Prize for investigative reporting.

== Life and career ==
Berens began his journalism career as a copy boy for The Columbus Dispatch in 1981 while attending Ohio State University. In 1995, he was named a finalist for the Pulitzer Prize for Beat Reporting for a series "revealing inequities in the county municipal court system, including the widespread jailing of individuals too poor to pay fines for minor offenses and the release of other, more serious offenders who were able to pay." He worked at The Columbus Dispatch for 13 years.

In 1994 Berens joined The Seattle Times. In 2012, Berens and Ken Armstrong won the Pulitzer Prize for Investigative Reporting for "their investigation of how a little known governmental body in Washington State moved vulnerable patients from safer pain-control medication to methadone, a cheaper, but more dangerous drug, coverage that prompted statewide health warnings." Also while at The Seattle Times, Berens and colleagues Julia Summerfed and Carol Ostrom were finalists for the 2007 Pulitzer Prize for Investigative Reporting for "their probe of sexual misconduct by health-care professionals that included creation of an extensive online database of offenders and caused a tightening of state regulation."

After 10 years at The Seattle Times, Berens joined the Chicago Tribune as an investigative reporter. In 2017, he and Patricia Callahan were named finalists for the Pulitzer Prize for Investigative Reporting for a series on abuse and deaths in Illinois group homes.

Berens has also received Worth Bingham Prize for Investigative Journalism, the Clark Mollenhoff Award for Investigative Reporting, the Edgar A. Poe Memorial Award, and the Gerald Loeb Award.

== Awards ==
- 1995 Finalist for the Pulitzer Prize for Beat Reporting
- 2007 Finalist for the Pulitzer Prize for Investigative Reporting (with Julia Summerfeld and Carol Ostrom)
- 2012 Pulitzer Prize for Investigative Reporting (with Ken Armstrong)
- 2017 Finalist for the Pulitzer Prize for Investigative Reporting (with Patricia Callahan)
