= Charles Ornstein =

American journalist

Charles Ornstein is an American journalist. He is currently a managing editor at ProPublica, overseeing the organization's local initiatives. His past reporting has focused on health care issues, including medical quality, the United States Department of Veterans Affairs and the pharmaceutical lobby. He is also an adjunct associate professor of journalism at Columbia University.

Born April 1, 1974, in Detroit, Michigan, Ornstein attended Hillel Day School. He is a graduate of the University of Pennsylvania, where he majored in history and psychology and was editor of the college newspaper, the Daily Pennsylvanian. In 1999-2000, he was a Media Fellow with the Henry J. Kaiser Family Foundation. He is a past president and vice president of the Association of Health Care Journalists. He was a reporter for The Dallas Morning News (where he covered health care on the business desk and worked in the Washington bureau) before joining the metro investigative projects team at the Los Angeles Times.

In 2004, Ornstein and Tracy Weber reported "The Trouble at King/Drew Hospital" in a series of articles for the Los Angeles Times. The newspaper received the 2005 Pulitzer Prize for Public Service "for its courageous, exhaustively researched series exposing deadly medical problems and racial injustice at a major public hospital". The series was also recognized by other journalism awards.

Another series by Ornstein and Weber, "When Caregivers Harm: California's Unwatched Nurses" in 2009, was a finalist for the Public Service Pulitzer. The citation recognized LA Times and ProPublica for "their exposure of gaps in California’s oversight of dangerous and incompetent nurses, blending investigative scrutiny and multimedia storytelling to produce corrective changes."

Previously based in Burbank, California, he lives in Glen Ridge, New Jersey, with his wife and three sons.

== Awards ==
- 2005 Pulitzer Prize for Public Service (awarded to the Los Angeles Times)
- 2006 Robert F. Kennedy Journalism Award
- 2010 Pulitzer Prize for Public Service finalist
- 2014 Health Policy Hero Award from National Center for Health Research
