= Susan Chira =

American journalist

Susan Deborah Chira
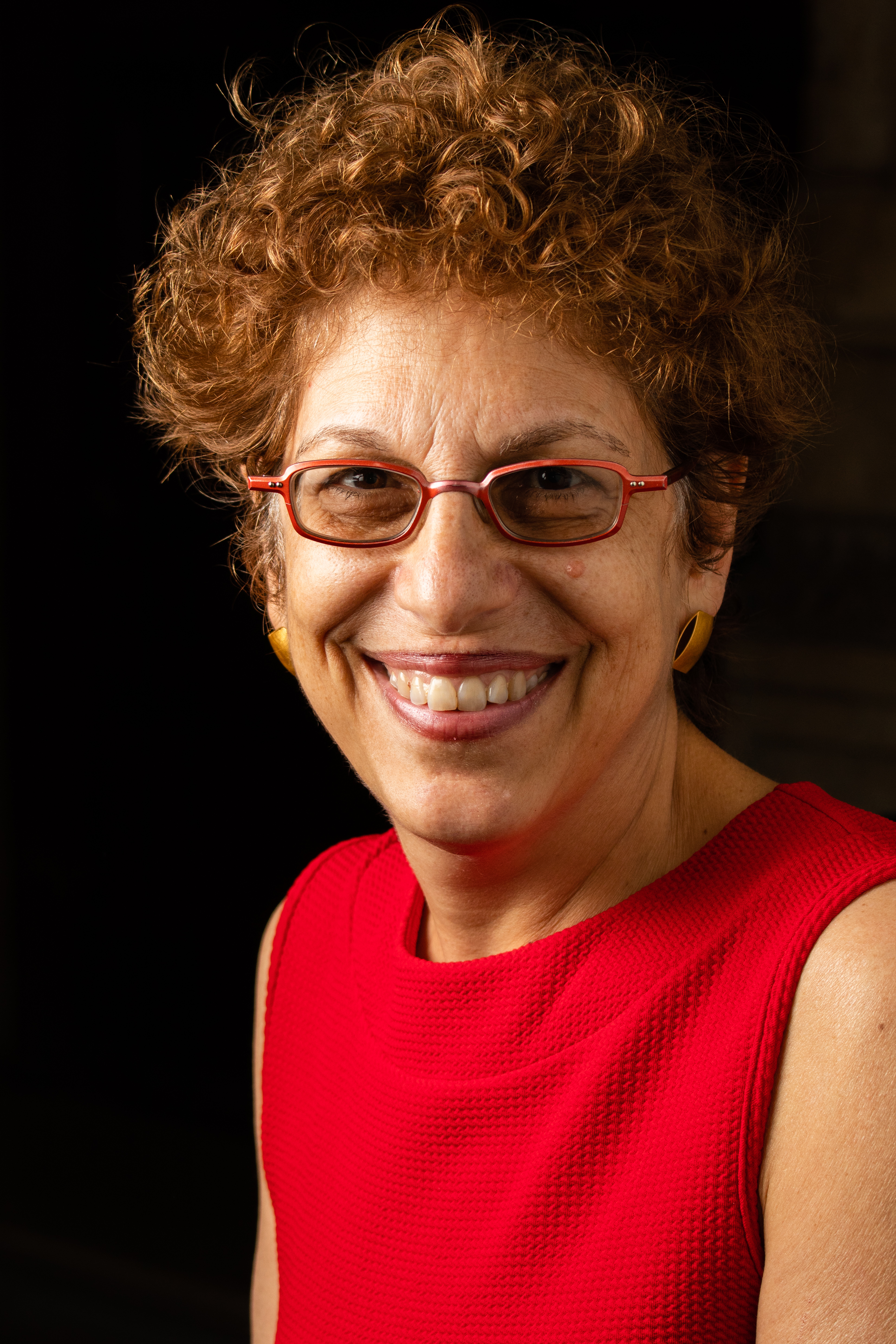
- Chira at the 2018 Pulitzer Prizes
- Born: May 18, 1958 (age 68); New York City, U.S.
- Status: married
- Occupations: journalist and author
- Notable credit(s): The New York Times; A Mother's Place (book)
- Spouse: Michael Shapiro
- Children: 2
- Awards: Gerald Loeb Award; 2018

Susan Deborah Chira (born May 18, 1958, in Manhattan) is an American journalist. She was the editor-in-chief of The Marshall Project until January 2025. Previously, Chira was a senior correspondent and editor covering gender for The New York Times. From September 2014 until September 2016, she was a deputy executive editor of the newspaper and oversaw its news report. She was previously the assistant managing editor for news, and was the Times's foreign news editor from 2004 to 2011.

She was raised in Rye, New York, and attended Phillips Academy Andover in Andover, Massachusetts, where she graduated in 1976. She received her Bachelor of Arts degree from Harvard University in 1980, graduating summa cum laude. She is a member of Phi Beta Kappa.

While at Harvard, Chira was the president of the Harvard Crimson.

Chira joined The New York Times in 1981. She was the Times's correspondent and then bureau chief in Tokyo from 1984 to 1989.

She has also been the metropolitan reporter at bureaus in Albany, New York, and Stamford, Connecticut, national education correspondent, deputy editor of the Foreign desk, editor of The Week in Review, and editorial director of book development. In May 2018, following a stint as an editor covering gender issues, she was named interim Metro editor following the resignation of Wendell Jamieson. She served in that post until the appointment of Clifford J. Levy to the position two months later.

She was part of The New York Times team that won the Pulitzer Prize for Public Service in 2018 for reporting on sexual harassment; her article, with Catrin Einhorn, focused on decades of sexual harassment at two Ford factories in Chicago. She also shared the 2018 Gerald Loeb Award for Investigative Journalism for her reporting on the sexual predator allegations against film producer Harvey Weinstein that led to the Me Too movement.

== Family ==
Chira is married to Michael Shapiro, a professor at Columbia University Graduate School of Journalism. They have two daughters, Eliza Shapiro, a reporter at the Times, and Joni Shapiro, a writer and librarian.

== Bibliography ==
- A Mother's Place: Taking the Debate About Working Mothers Beyond Guilt and Blame. New York: Harper, 1998. ISBN 0-06-017327-0 ISBN 978-0060173272
- Cautious Revolutionaries: Occupation Planners and Japan's Post-War Land Reform. Agricultural Policy Research Center, 1982. ASIN: B0006EBHJS
