= Documented (news organization) =

Online news for immigrants in New York City

- Formation: 2018; 8 years ago
- Type: Non-profit online news organization
- Official language: English; Spanish; Chinese; Haitian Creole
- Key people: Ethar El-Katatney (editor)
- Website: documentedny.com

Documented is a New York City-based non-profit news organization serving and reporting on the city's immigrant communities.

Documented was founded by reporters Mazin Sidahmed and Max Siegelbaum in 2018 after they happened to both be assigned to New York City the previous year. They started the project in response to the Trump administration family separation policy based on their perception that news coverage of immigration, a topic they had frequently worked on, was not focused on and accessible to immigrant communities themselves. Initially started from Siegelbaum's apartment with a for-profit subscription model, they became a nonprofit a few months later to expand their reach. After calling the Brooklyn Org (formerly Brooklyn Community Foundation), the organization was given a free office space for eighteen months and a spot in an accelerator program. Further funding came from the Knight Foundation, the Ford Foundation and Borealis Philanthropy. As of January 2025, Documented employs seventeen full-time staff and other freelance journalists, working in a newsroom shared with The City, and publishes content in four languages: English, Spanish, Chinese and Haitian Creole.

Sidahmed stated the organization focuses on "basic, everyday economic and political issues" affecting working-class immigrants as opposed to "flashy, investigative stories, or high-minded pieces". For instance, it has published information on applying for prepaid debits cards given by the city to asylum seekers and an explanation of minimum wage policies for delivery app workers. Documented partnered with ProPublica to create "Wage Theft Monitor", an online tool tracking businesses that have committed wage theft against immigrant staff based on more than twenty years of data from the New York State Department of Labor that they filed a lawsuit to obtain. In a separate investigation, reporter April Xu found that Fay Da Bakery, New York City's biggest Chinese bakery chain, stole hundreds of thousands of dollars in wages before being sued and settling with employees for $940,000.

Documented has been noted for its use of social media to connect with different immigrant communities, both to share its reporting and gather information. As part of its efforts to reach Spanish speakers on WhatsApp, it has created four-panel illustrations to simplify complicated news and make them easy to distribute via the "forward" feature, inspired from the spread of fake news on the platform. Documented is the first non-Chinese newsroom in the United States with an account for its product on WeChat. After finding that many immigrants from the Caribbean primarily identify with their neighborhood, with 70% using Nextdoor and Citizen apps for local news, Documented published information tailored to them on Nextdoor, eschewing links for customized content.
