= Harry Siegel =

American writer

Harry Siegel (born 1977) is an American journalist and senior editor with The City Reporter, who previously served as a senior editor for The Daily Beast.

== Early life and education ==
Siegel is a lifelong resident of the Brooklyn area of New York City. He graduated from Brandeis University.

== Career ==
Siegel worked at The New York Sun as an editorial writer and the paper's first op-ed page editor when it launched in 2002. He would go on to found the web magazine New Partisan with Tim Marchman. Siegel was editor-in-chief of the New York Press in 2005 and 2006, and worked as an editor at Politico from 2008-2010. In the 2010-2011 academic year, he was a Knight-Wallace Fellow at the University of Michigan. He has also worked in politics at times, working as a researcher for political consultant Hank Sheinkopf in 2001, and as policy director for New York State gubernatorial candidate Thomas Suozzi in 2006.

Siegel co-authored The Prince of the City: Giuliani, New York and the Genius of American Life with his father Fred Siegel, which appeared on the 100 Notable Books of 2005 list compiled by The New York Times. Siegel's commentary has appeared in The Wall Street Journal, City Journal, The New Republic, the New York Post, The New York Observer and The Weekly Standard. He has made guest appearances on CNN, MSNBC and National Public Radio.
