= Megan Rose =

Criminal justice journalist

Megan Rose (née McCloskey) is a criminal justice journalist. In 2020, Rose won the Pulitzer Prize for national reporting, with fellow journalists T. Christian Miller and Robert Faturechi, for her reporting of the United States Seventh Fleet accidents.

== Education ==
Rose graduated with bachelor’s degrees in journalism and political science from the University of Missouri.

== Career ==
Rose is a journalist at ProPublica, where she currently covers criminal justice. She previously covered the military, including investigating spend of the U.S. government in Afghanistan, and the failed actions of The Pentagon to find and identify missing service members.

Prior to working at ProPublica, she worked for the Associated Press, and was national correspondent at Stars and Stripes newspaper. In this role she reported from conflict and disaster zones including Iraq, Afghanistan and Haiti.

In 2020, in addition to the Pulitzer Prize in national reporting, she was also awarded the Gerald R. Ford Journalism Award. She has also received a White House Correspondents’ Association award and the Deborah Howell Award for Writing Excellence, and was a finalist for the Livingston Award twice.
