= Documentary Channel =

Documentary Channel may refer to:

- Documentary Channel (American TV channel), an American digital cable and satellite television network that featured documentary programming
- Documentary Channel (Canadian TV channel), a Canadian English-language Category A specialty channel owned by the Canadian Broadcasting Corporation (CBC), the National Film Board of Canada (NFB) and four other independent producers
- Documentary Channel (New Zealand), a digital television channel in New Zealand
- Al Jazeera Documentary Channel, a Qatari Arabic-language documentary channel

== See also ==
- Documentary (disambiguation)
- List of documentary television channels
