= Carroll Bogert =

CEO of The City

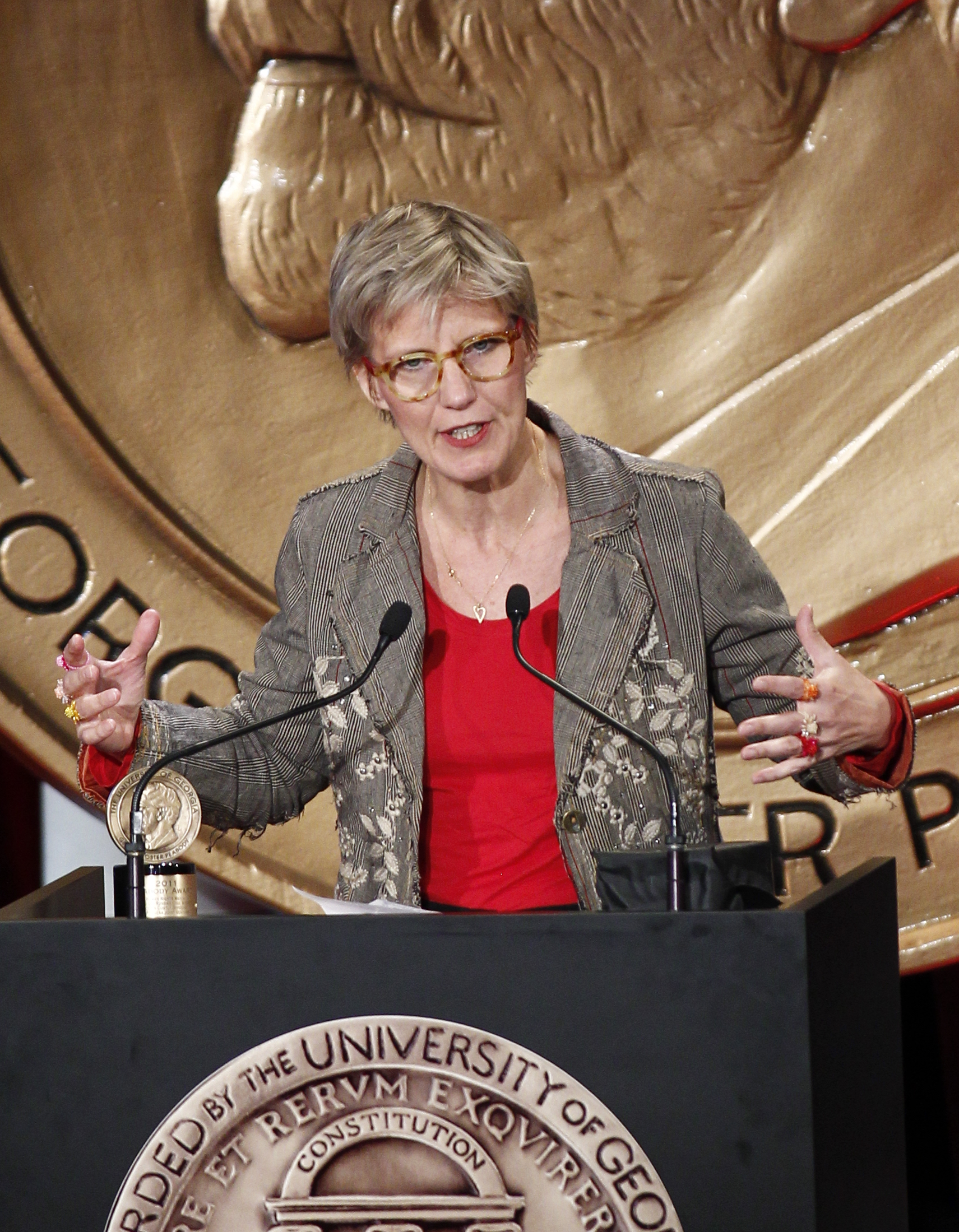
- Carroll Bogert accepts the Peabody Award, May 2012

Carroll Bogert is the CEO of the non-profit news organization, The City Reporter. Bogert is the former president of The Marshall Project, former foreign correspondent for Newsweek, and former associate director of Human Rights Watch.

== Education ==
Bogert earned an MA in East Asian studies and a BA magna cum laude from Harvard University. Bogert speaks Russian, French, and Mandarin. In 2019, Bogert was awarded the Centennial Medal from Harvard.

== Career ==
Bogert worked as a foreign correspondent for Newsweek, based in southeast Asia, the Soviet Union, and China. While at Newsweek, Bogert covered significant historical events including the Tiananmen Square protests and the collapse of the Soviet Union. For 18 years, Bogert served as deputy director of Human Rights Watch, leading global media production for the organization.

In 2016, Bogert was named President of the Marshall Project.

On February 28th, 2025, Bogert stepped down as president of The Marshall Project.

In September 2025, Bogert was named CEO of the non-profit news organization, The City Reporter.
