= Nic Dawes =

Nicholas Dawes
- Occupations: Editor, Communications Director
- Title: Communications Director for Human Rights Watch, editor-in-chief of the Mail & Guardian

Nicholas Dawes is a journalist, editor, and communications professional, who has been the Executive Director of The City since 2021. He was previously Communications Director for Human Rights Watch, was Chief Editorial and Content Officer for the Hindustan Times, and Editor-in-Chief of the Mail & Guardian newspaper. He was born in Cape Town and finished his schooling in Canada.

== Life and career ==
Dawes completed his high school education at the Lester B. Pearson United World College of the Pacific in British Columbia, Canada. He then studied Science and later English literature at the University of Cape Town before attending graduate school in the United States on a Fulbright Scholarship.

On his return to South Africa he wrote as a freelance for a wide range of local publications, and for television, before becoming News and Finance editor at one of the country's early web portals, World Online.

He left World Online to become Managing Director at Maverick Interface Design, a digital communications agency that helped companies to develop their internet and mobile strategies, but ultimate decided to return to journalism. After a stint as Cape Business Editor, and political columnist at the now-defunct broadsheet ThisDay, he joined the Mail & Guardian in 2004 as associate editor, focusing principally on public policy and economics. He was also heavily involved in the Mail & Guardian’s investigations, and has won several awards for that work. He replaced Ferial Haffajee as Editor in Chief of the Mail & Guardian on June 1, 2009. Dawes recently resigned and moved to India to take up a position at the Hindustan Times. In October 2016, Dawes was hired to serve as Communications Director for international human rights research and advocacy group Human Rights Watch. In January 2021, he took up the role of Executive Director at The City, a nonprofit news organization in New York City.

=== Personal life ===
Dawes is married to Aurelia Driver, and has two young children, Hannah and Alexander. The family lived in the Johannesburg suburb of Parkview before moving to New Delhi.
