= Tracy Weber (journalist) =

American journalist (born 1963)

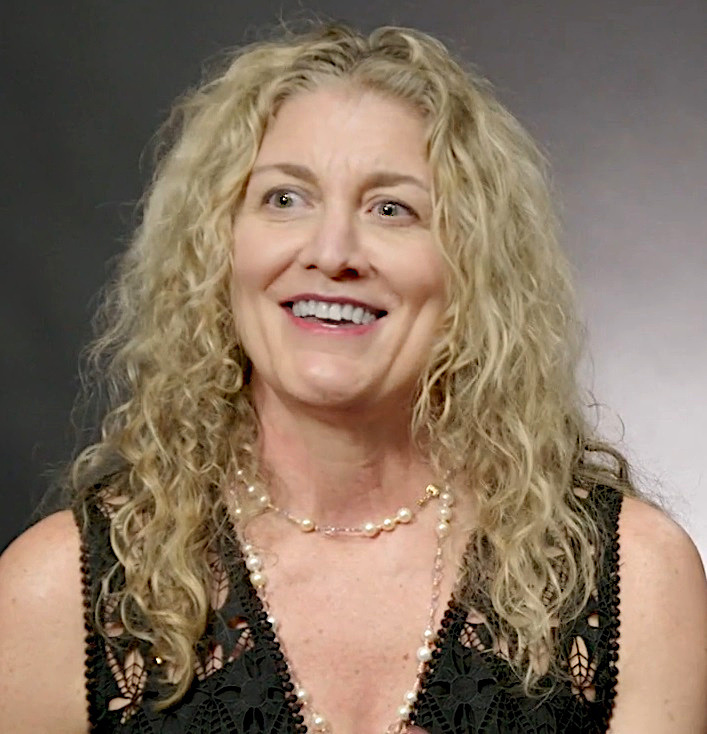
- Weber in 2019
- Born: May 12, 1963 (age 63); La Grange, Illinois
- Education: UC Berkeley Graduate School of Journalism
- Occupation: Journalist

Tracy Weber is an American journalist, a reporter for ProPublica.

Tracy was one of the country's top track runners as a high school student. She recorded a 4:44.7 mile while competing for the Cindergals Running Club (San Jose) and Lynbrook High School in California.

She graduated from University of California, Berkeley with a B.A. and M.A. in Journalism in 1989. She was a reporter for the Orange County Register and the Los Angeles Times.

In 2004, Weber and Charles Ornstein reported "The Trouble at King/Drew Hospital" in a series of articles for the Los Angeles Times. The newspaper received the 2005 Pulitzer Prize for Public Service "for its courageous, exhaustively researched series exposing deadly medical problems and racial injustice at a major public hospital". The series was also recognized by other journalism awards.

Another series by Ornstein and Weber, "When Caregivers Harm: California's Unwatched Nurses" in 2009, was a finalist for the Public Service Pulitzer. The citation recognized LA Times and ProPublica for "their exposure of gaps in California’s oversight of dangerous and incompetent nurses, blending investigative scrutiny and multimedia storytelling to produce corrective changes." Weber is married, with two children.

== Awards ==
- 2000 Pan American Health Organization Award
- 2005 Pulitzer Prize for Public Service (awarded to the Los Angeles Times)
- 2006 Robert F. Kennedy Journalism Award
- 2010 Pulitzer Prize for Public Service finalist
- 2014 Health Policy Hero Award from National Center for Health Research
