= Documentary (disambiguation) =

A documentary film is a nonfiction motion picture intended to "document reality, primarily for instruction, education or maintaining a historical record".

Documentary may also refer to:

- Documentary photography, a popular form of photography used to chronicle events or environments both significant and relevant to history and historical events as well as everyday life
- Documentary theatre, theatre that uses pre-existing documentary material as source material for stories about real events and people, frequently without altering the text in performance
- Radio documentary or Audio documentary, spoken word formats devoted to non-fiction narrative
- Television documentary, a televised media production that screens documentaries
- Web documentary, a documentary production that differs from the more traditional forms by applying a full complement of multimedia tools
- The Documentary, a 2005 album by the Game

== See also ==
- Document (disambiguation)
- Documentary Channel (disambiguation)
