= Koch (film) =

- Directed by: Neil Barsky
- Produced by: Jenny Carchman, Lindsey Megrue
- Edited by: Juliet Weber, Laura Madden
- Distributed by: Zeitgeist Films
- Release dates: October 8, 2012 (The Hamptons Film Festival); February 1, 2013
- Running time: 95 minutes
- Country: United States
- Language: English
- Box office: $342,941

Koch is a 2012 documentary film directed by Neil Barsky about former New York City Mayor Ed Koch. Koch premiered at the Hamptons International Film Festival on October 8, 2012 and is distributed by Zeitgeist Films. It opened theatrically in the United States on February 1, 2013 the day Koch's death was publicized.

== Plot ==
First-time filmmaker and former Wall Street Journal reporter Neil Barsky's 2012 documentary film Koch explores the origins, career, and legacy of Edward Irving “Ed” Koch, who served as Mayor of New York City for three consecutive terms from 1978 to 1989. With candid interviews and rare archival footage, the film offers a close look at a man known for being intensely private in spite of his dynamic public persona, and chronicles the tumultuous events which marked his time in office – a fiercely competitive 1977 election, the 1980 transit strike, the burgeoning AIDS epidemic, landmark housing renewal initiatives, and an irreparable municipal corruption scandal. Poignant and often humorous, Koch is a portrait not only of one of New York's most iconic political figures, but of New York City itself at a time of radical upheaval and transformation.

== Cast ==
- Ed Koch as himself

== Awards ==
- 2012: Hamptons International Film Festival Official Selection
- 2012: Palm Springs Film Festival Official Selection
- 2013: Atlanta Jewish Film Festival Official Selection

== Reception ==
"Both as a portrait of a changing New York City and the man who was at the epicentre of that evolution for over a decade, "Koch" is a delight. It's a compelling, never dull time capsule that isn't so much a celebration of Ed Koch, as an honorable and entertaining study of exactly the kind of flawed and principled man that New Yorkers love to get behind. And they did." -Kevin Jagernauth, Indiewire

"Though it spends time with Mr. Koch in the present and summarizes his premayoral life (some of it spent in Newark), “Koch” is above all a chronicle of New York civic life from 1977 to 1989... It is hardly an uncritical account of Mr. Koch's dozen years as mayor, but time has a way of turning the furious political battles of the past into amusing war stories, and of softening old enmities." -A.O. Scott, The New York Times
