= T. Christian Miller =

American journalist

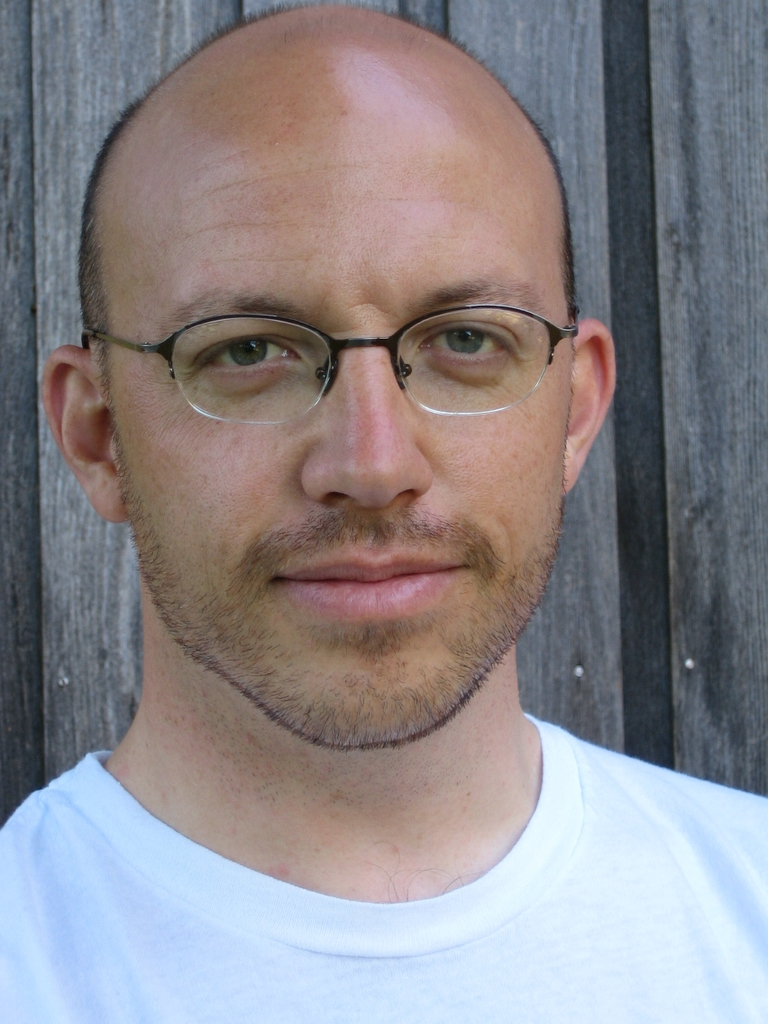
- T. Christian Miller
- Born: 1970 (age 55–56); Baltimore, Maryland, United States
- Education: University of California, Berkeley
- Occupations: Journalist, author
- Employer: ProPublica
- Known for: Investigative journalism
- Spouse: Leslie L. Miller

T. Christian Miller (born 1970) is an American investigative reporter, editor, author and war correspondent for ProPublica. He has focused on how multinational corporations operate in foreign countries, documenting human rights and environmental abuses. Miller has covered four wars—Kosovo, Colombia, Israel and the West Bank, and Iraq. He also covered the 2000 presidential campaign. He is also known for his work in the field of computer-assisted reporting and was awarded a Knight Fellowship at Stanford University in 2012 to study innovation in journalism. In 2016, Miller was awarded the Pulitzer Prize for Explanatory Journalism with Ken Armstrong of The Marshall Project. In 2019, he served as a producer of the Netflix limited series Unbelievable, which was based on the prize-winning article. In 2020, Miller shared the Pulitzer Prize for National Reporting with other reporters from ProPublica and The Seattle Times. With Megan Rose and Robert Faturechi, Miller co-won the 2020 award for his reporting on United States Seventh Fleet accidents.

== Career and biography ==
Miller grew up in Charleston, South Carolina. His mother, Linda Miller, was a member of the local school board who focused on integration issues. His father, Donald H. Miller, was a research biochemist at the Medical University of South Carolina. Miller graduated from Bishop England High School.

Miller began his career in journalism at the University of California at Berkeley. He majored in English and minored in French while becoming the University Editor of the Daily Californian, an independent campus newspaper. After college, he worked for the St. Petersburg Times, now the Tampa Bay Times.

In 1997, he went to work for the Los Angeles Times. While at that paper, he covered local, national and international news, opening the newspaper's first bureau in Bogotá, Colombia. Miller was briefly held prisoner by the leftist Colombian guerrilla group known as the FARC, or Fuerzas Armadas Revolucionarias de Colombia, an episode later documented in a short animated news feature. Two of his reporters were later held captive by a second Colombian leftist group, the ELN, or Ejército de Liberación Nacional.

Miller's investigative reporting in Colombia uncovered that a contractor for an American oil company, Occidental Petroleum, had helped to coordinate the bombing of civilians by the Colombian Air Force of a small town in northeastern Colombia which left 17 dead. His coverage of the Santo Domingo bombing led to the U.S. suspending military aid to the Colombian Air Force and to a judgement by the Inter-American Court of Human Rights condemning the Colombian government.

Miller became a national correspondent for the Los Angeles Times based in Washington, D.C. While there, Miller served as the only journalist in the U.S. dedicated exclusively to covering the Iraqi reconstruction. Miller published a book on the subject, Blood Money: Wasted Billions, Lost Lives and Corporate Greed in Iraq.

In 2008, Miller was one of the founding employees of ProPublica, an independent, non-profit start-up dedicated to investigative reporting. While at ProPublica, Miller has published investigative projects with various news organizations, including the Los Angeles Times, The New York Times, The Washington Post, Newsweek, Salon, National Public Radio, This American Life, ABC News 20/20 and PBS' Frontline. He also served as a senior editor. In that role, he oversaw stories by ProPublica journalist Heather Vogell that led to a Justice Department settlement with the country's biggest landlords over price fixing.

Miller is a leading figure in innovation in journalism, especially in transparency, trust and data-driven journalism. He delivered the U.S. Army Creekmore Lecture in 2007, and has taught at the University of Southern California, Columbia University, Stanford University, the University of California at Berkeley and the College of Charleston. He spent a year at Stanford University as a Knight Fellow, studying transparency and new models of journalism. Miller has served as treasurer and board member of Investigative Reporters and Editors, or the IRE, the nation's largest organization of investigative journalists.

== Honors and awards ==
Miller has won numerous local, national and international awards. In 1999, he won the John B. Oakes Award for Environmental Journalism for his coverage of runaway growth in the Santa Monica Mountains. In 2004, he was awarded the Livingston Award for international reporting, one of the most competitive and prestigious reporting prizes in American journalism, for his coverage of children and war. In 2005, he won an Overseas Press Club award. In 2009, he won an Investigative Reporters and Editors award. In 2010, he won a George Polk award with Daniel Zwerdling of National Public radio for his work covering traumatic brain injuries in the U.S. military. In that same year, he was also given the Selden Ring Award for investigative reporting on private contracting in Iraq and Afghanistan. In 2015, Miller, Marcela Gaviria, and colleagues from ProPublica and Frontline were awarded two News & Documentary Emmy Awards, the Robert F. Kennedy Center For Justice and Human Rights award for their work documenting the support given by the Firestone Company to Charles Taylor, Liberia's former president and a convicted war criminal, during that country's civil war. In 2016, Miller, along with Ken Armstrong of The Marshall Project, won the Pulitzer Prize in Explanatory Reporting for an article on the Washington and Colorado serial rape cases. In 2020, he and several other ProPublica reporters shared the Pulitzer Prize for National Reporting with members of The Seattle Times. With Megan Rose and Robert Faturechi, Miller received the award for a report on United States Seventh Fleet accidents. In 2024, Miller and his colleagues at ProPublica and The Capitol Forum won the Gerald Loeb Award, the most prestigious in business writing, for a series on denials by health insurance companies. In 2026, Miller was part of a team of reporters from numerous outlets honored for Public Service by the ASME's National Magazine Awards for chronicling ICE raids against Venezuelan immigrants.

== Selected works ==
- (with Ken Armstrong) A False Report: A True Story of Rape in America. New York: Crown. 2018. ISBN 978-1-52-475993-3.
- Blood Money: Wasted Billions, Lost Lives, and Corporate Greed in Iraq. New York: Little, Brown and Company. 2007. ISBN 9780316030816.
