= Fred Siegel =

American historian (1945–2023)

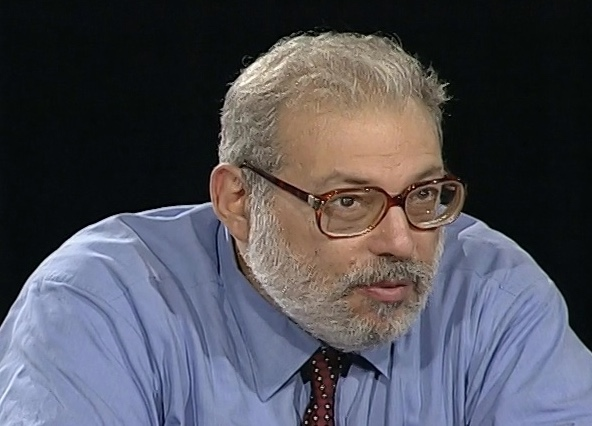
Siegel on CUNY TV's Urban Agenda, 1999

Fred Siegel (/ˈsiːɡəl/ SEE-gəl; March 27, 1945 – May 7, 2023) was an American historian and conservative writer who was a senior fellow at the Manhattan Institute for Policy Research, a conservative think tank which focuses on urban policy and politics. He served as a professor of history and the humanities at Cooper Union and was a contributor to numerous publications, including The New York Post (where he had a weekly column), The New Republic, The Atlantic Monthly, Commonweal, Tikkun, and Telos.

Siegel served as the political advisor to several political candidates in New York City, including former Mayor Rudolph Giuliani. He was the author of several books, including The Prince of the City: Giuliani, New York, and the Genius of American Life and The Future Once Happened Here: New York, D.C., L.A., and the Fate of America's Big Cities.

Siegel was the father of writer and editor Harry Siegel. Fred Siegel died from complications relating to a series of infections in Brooklyn, New York, on May 7, 2023, at the age of 78.

== Selected publications ==
- Siegel, Frederick F. (1984) Troubled journey : from Pearl Harbor to Ronald Reagan. Hill and Wang, New York ISBN 9780809094431
- “Is Archie Bunker Fit to Rule? Or: How Immanuel Kant Became One of the Founding Fathers”. Telos 69 (Fall 1986). New York: Telos Press.
- Siegel, Frederick F. (1987). The roots of southern distinctiveness: tobacco and society in Danville, Virginia, 1780-1865. University of North Carolina Press, Chapel Hill ISBN 9780807817278, OCLC 14187675
- “The Godfather of American Liberalism”. City-Journal (Summer 2009). New York: City Journal (New York).
- Siegel, Frederick F. (2013), The revolt against the masses: how liberalism has undermined the middle class (First American ed.), New York: Encounter Books, ISBN 9781594036989, LCCN 2013007444.
- Siegel, Fred; Siegel, Harry (2007). The Prince of the City: Giuliani, New York, and the Genius of American Life. New York: Encounter Books. ISBN 978-1-59403-149-6. OCLC 1036801634.
