= Bill Keller =

American journalist (born 1949)

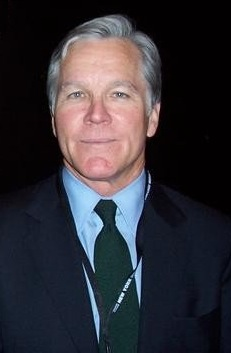
- Keller in March 2006
- Born: January 18, 1949 (age 77); Palo Alto, California, U.S.
- Education: Pomona College
- Occupation: Journalist
- Known for: The New York Times; The Marshall Project
- Spouses: Ann Cooper (divorced) Emma Gilbey (m. 1999)

Executive editor of The New York Times
- In office July 2003 – September 2011
- Preceded by: Howell Raines
- Succeeded by: Jill Abramson

Bill Keller (born January 18, 1949) is an American journalist. He was the founding editor-in-chief of The Marshall Project, a nonprofit that reports on criminal justice in the United States. Previously, he was a columnist for The New York Times, and served as the paper's executive editor from July 2003 until September 2011. On June 2, 2011, he announced that he would step down from the position to become a full-time writer. Jill Abramson replaced him as executive editor.

Keller worked in the Times Moscow bureau from 1986 to 1991, eventually as bureau chief, spanning the final years of the Cold War and the dissolution of the Soviet Union. For his reporting during 1988, he won a Pulitzer Prize.

== Early life ==
Bill Keller was born in Palo Alto, California. He is the son of former chairman and chief executive of the Chevron Corporation, George M. Keller. He attended the Roman Catholic schools St. Matthews and Junípero Serra High School in San Mateo, California, and graduated in 1970 from Pomona College, where he began his journalistic career as a reporter for a campus newspaper called The Collegian. From July 1970 to March 1979, he was a reporter in Portland with The Oregonian, followed by stints with the Congressional Quarterly Weekly Report and the Dallas Times Herald. He is married to Emma Gilbey Keller and has three children.

== The New York Times ==
Keller joined The New York Times in April 1984, and served in the following capacities:

- Reporter in the Washington, D.C. bureau (1984–1986)
- Reporter in the Moscow bureau (1986–1988)
- Bureau chief in the Moscow bureau (1988–1991)
- Bureau chief in the Johannesburg bureau (1992–1995)
- Foreign editor (1995–1997)
- Managing editor (1997–2001)
- Op-ed columnist and senior writer (2001–2003)
- Executive editor (July 2003 to September 2011)

He won the Pulitzer Prize for International Reporting for his "resourceful and detailed coverage of events in the U.S.S.R." during 1988. That is, in the Soviet Union during the year it established its Congress of People's Deputies, the last year before the revolutions of 1989 in Central and Eastern Europe.

=== Bush Administration ===
Keller and The Times also published a story on another classified program to monitor terrorist-related financial transactions through the Brussels, Belgium-based Society for Worldwide Interbank Financial Telecommunication (SWIFT) on June 23, 2006. Many commentators, as well as some elected officials such as U.S. Congressman Peter T. King, called for the U.S. Justice Department to prosecute The New York Times and the confidential sources who leaked the existence of this counter-terrorism program despite relevant statutes that forbid revealing classified information that could threaten national security, especially in a time of war.

In an attempt to respond to criticism stemming from the disclosure of the classified Terrorist Finance Tracking Program, the NSA program's official name, Keller stated in a published letter that President Bush himself had acknowledged as early as September 2001 that efforts were underway "to identify and investigate the financial infrastructure of the international terrorist networks" and "to follow the money as a trail to the terrorists." In an Op-ed column in The Times, Keller, together with Los Angeles Times editor Dean Baquet wrote that "Our job, especially in times like these, is to bring our readers information that will enable them to judge how well their elected leaders are fighting on their behalf and at what price." Keller's critics, including U.S. Treasury Secretary John W. Snow, responded to Keller's letter by pointing out that there is a vast difference between stating general intentions to track terrorist finances and the exact means employed to achieve those goals. But, as Keller wrote, this was the same Secretary Snow who invited a group of reporters to a 6-day trip on a military aircraft "to show off the department's efforts to track terrorist financing."

Keller was a leading supporter of the 2003 invasion of Iraq, explaining his backing for military action in his article 'The I-Can't-Believe-I'm-A-Hawk Club'. Two days after the invasion, Keller wrote the column 'Why Colin Powell Should Go', arguing for US Secretary of State's resignation because his strategy of diplomacy at the UN had failed. In contrast, Keller was much more sympathetic to Deputy Defence Secretary Paul Wolfowitz, describing him as the 'Sunshine Warrior'.

On July 6, 2005, Keller spoke in defense of Judith Miller and her refusal to give up documents relating to the Valerie Plame case.

=== NSA Terrorist Surveillance Program ===
Keller was reported to have refused to answer questions from The Times public editor, Byron Calame, on the timing of the December 16, 2005, article on the classified National Security Agency (NSA) Terrorist Surveillance Program. Keller's delay of the paper's reporting about NSA overreach until after Bush's close reelection was controversial. The Times's series of articles on this topic won a Pulitzer Prize. The source of the disclosure of this NSA program was investigated by the United States Justice Department. The NSA program itself was reviewed by the Senate Judiciary Committee as to whether it sidesteps the Foreign Intelligence Surveillance Act, and after The Times articles, the Administration changed its procedures, allowing for more safeguards and more Congressional and judicial oversight.

Keller discussed the deliberations behind the Times' decision to publish the story on July 5, 2006, in a PBS interview with Jeffrey Brown that included a discussion of the issues involved with former National Security Agency Director Admiral Bobby Ray Inman.

=== Catholic Church sex abuse crisis ===
Keller widely reported on the Catholic sex abuse cases and flatly put the blame on John Paul II himself : "The uncomfortable and largely unspoken truth is that the current turmoil in the Roman Catholic Church is not just a sad footnote to the life of a beloved figure. This is a crisis of the pope's making."

== Nelson Mandela ==
Keller wrote a 128-page juvenile biography of Nelson Mandela published by Kingfisher Books in 2008, Tree Shaker: The Story of Nelson Mandela. He had served as the Times bureau chief in Johannesburg from April 1992 to May 1995—spanning the end of apartheid in South Africa and election of Mandela's African National Congress as the governing party in 1994.

Keller's wife since 1999, Emma Gilbey, wrote a full biography of Winnie Mandela published in 1993, The Lady: The Life and Times of Winnie Mandela (Jonathan Cape).

== The Marshall Project ==
The Marshall Project is a nonprofit nonpartisan online journalism organization covering criminal justice in the United States. The project was originally conceived by former hedge fund manager, filmmaker and journalist Neil Barsky, who announced it in his byline in an unrelated New York Times article in November 2013. In February 2014, The New York Times reported that Keller was going to work for the Marshall Project. The Marshall Project formally launched in November 2014. Keller was editor in chief of the Marshall Project from 2014 until his retirement in 2019.

== Bibliography ==
=== Books ===
- Keller, Bill (2008). Tree shaker : the story of Nelson Mandela. Kingfisher Books.
- Keller, Bill (2022). What's Prison For?: Punishment and Rehabilitation in the Age of Mass Incarceration. Columbia Global Reports.

=== Essays and reporting ===
- Keller, Bill (June 29, 2015). "Prison revolt : a former law–and–order conservative takes a lead on criminal justice reform". Profiles. The New Yorker. 91 (18): 22–28. (Note: Profiles Pat Nolan. Title in the online table of contents is "Conservatives for Criminal–Justice Reform".)

———————
