= Robyn Semien =

American television and radio producer

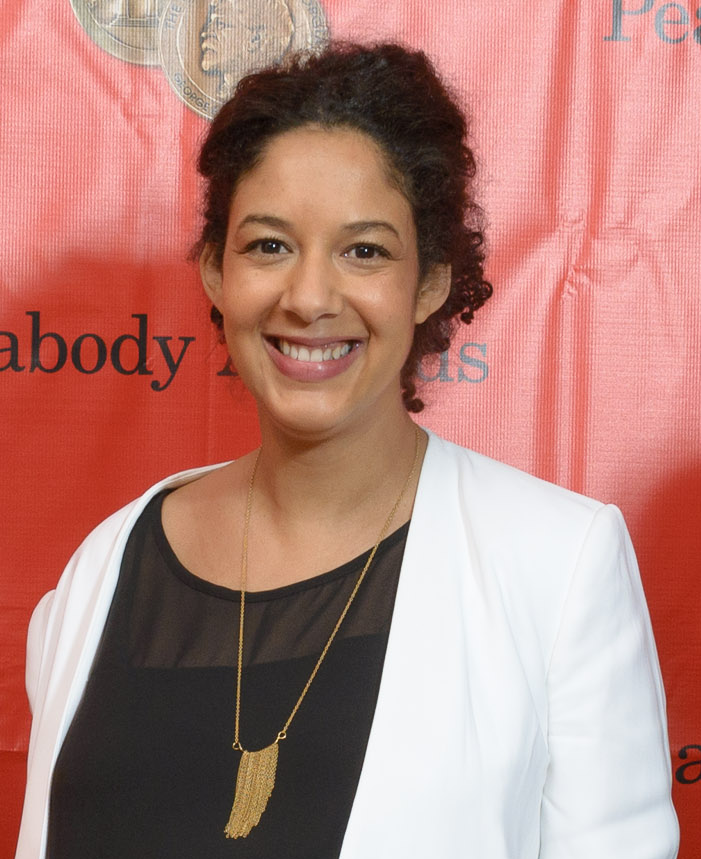
- Semien in 2014
- Education: University of California, Los Angeles
- Occupation: Producer
- Known for: This American Life
- Notable work: "Harper High School", "Help Wanted"
- Awards: Peabody Award

Robyn Semien is a television and radio producer who has worked on This American Life in radio, television and video formats.

== Early life ==
Semien attended the University of California, Los Angeles.

== Career ==
=== Film and television ===
Semien worked as an editor and producer of film and television, including as an associate editor on the first season of This American Life's television documentary series with Showtime, and then as a producer on the second season in 2008. Semien was also a producer on the 2012 video project, This American Life: One Night Only at BAM.

=== Radio ===
Semien joined This American Life's radio team in 2007. She's drawn notice for reporting and producing on a wide array of topics, from card-counting in blackjack and her father's car (for the latter, she was the listener-voted favorite in This American Life's 400th-episode competition among the show's producers to see who could develop the best radio story based on an idea pitched by the producer's parents) to race and policing (named to The Atlantic's round-up of "exceptional works of journalism" from 2015), treatment for young, non-offending pedophiles, and school inequality and violence. With Julie Snyder and Ira Glass, Semien co-produced the acclaimed 2013 "Harper High School" two-part episode of This American Life about a Chicago high school where 29 students had been shot in the previous year. The episode made "best of" lists at Slate, The Atlantic, Newsweek, and ProPublica, among others. Shortly after the episode aired, First Lady Michelle Obama visited the school, and she and President Barack Obama invited Harper High students to the White House.

=== Awards ===
Semien and collaborators on the "Harper High School" episode won a Peabody Award, with judges calling the work "vivid, unblinking, poignant and sometimes gut-wrenching”; the Dart Center prize for journalism and trauma (“profoundly moving” and “extraordinarily comprehensive and compassionate"); the Jack R. Howard Award for Radio In-Depth coverage; an Alfred I. duPont-Columbia University Award ("truly immersive, and intercut with lively use of sound[; t]hese elements offered valuable insights"); the Fred M. Hechinger Grand Prize for Distinguished Education Reporting from the Education Writers Association; and the Third Coast International Audio Festival's Gold Award for best documentary.

In 2014, Semien, Luke Malone and Ira Glass won Third Coast International Audio Festival's Radio Impact Award for their story about "on the struggles of young, non-offending pedophiles in their teens and early 20s and what they were doing to get treatment." Semien produced, Malone reported and Glass edited. For the same piece, Semien, Malone and Glass were also finalists for The Society of Professional Journalists' Deadline Club 2015 award for best "Radio or Audio Reporting" and third place in the National Headliners Award for best "Radio stations documentary or public affairs."

In 2008, Semien was nominated as producer, with This American Life's television team, for the International Documentary Association's award for best continuing series.

== Personal life ==
Semien is married to Damien Graef, and in April 2013, together the two opened a wine store in Williamsburg, Brooklyn, called Bibber & Bell Wine and Spirits. In 2016, Brooklyn Magazine named Bibber & Bell to its list of the borough's best wine shops.
