= Gross misdemeanor =

Intermediate-level of crime

In United States law, a gross misdemeanor is a crime which is more serious than a regular misdemeanor, but not to the extent of a felony. It serves as an intermediate-level offense, though many states (including the federal government) only classify offenses as either misdemeanors or felonies, with nothing in between. Such crimes may include petty theft, simple assault or driving under the influence of alcohol and/or other drugs. Typically, the maximum sentence is one year in county jail and/or $5,000 in fines.

== See also ==
- Misdemeanor
