= Neil Barsky =

American journalist (born 1958)

- Education: Oberlin College; Columbia University
- Occupations: journalist, former hedge fund manager, filmmaker, prison abolitionist & philanthropist
- Notable work: The Marshall Project; Koch

Neil Barsky is an American journalist, former hedge fund manager and filmmaker. He is known for directing the 2012 film Koch. He is also the founder of The Marshall Project, a journalism nonprofit intended to shed light on the United States criminal justice system. The organisation won two Pulitzer prizes in the 7 years while Barsky was chair.

== Early life and education ==
Barsky pursued his undergraduate studies at Oberlin College and obtained a graduate degree in journalism at the Columbia Journalism School. Barsky is Jewish and attributes his support for social justice to his Jewish schooling and upbringing.

== Career ==
=== Early career ===
Barsky's interest in journalism was sparked by a high school project on the effect of busing legislation on communities in Boston. He failed to get a journalism job right out of college and therefore went to the Columbia Journalism School. In 1986, Barskey started work in the news business, working the business desk at the New York Daily News. In 1988, he moved to the Wall Street Journal, where he covered commercial real estate and the gambling industry. He left the Journal in 1993 for a career in finance.

=== Finance ===
Barsky's first profession was as an analyst for Morgan Stanley in 1993, working on commercial real estate and in the gaming industry. Within a year, he was listed in the All-Star Analysts list by Institutional Investor.

In 1998, Barsky and fellow Morgan Stanley alumnus Scott M. Sipprelle started the hedge fund, Midtown Research. In 2002, Barsky left Midtown Research and opened his own hedge fund, Alson Capital Partners, which was named after his children. At its peak, the fund would have $3.5 billion in assets under management. As a result of the 2008 financial crisis, Alson lost 24% of its assets. The fund shut down, in 2009 returning $800 million to investors.

=== Return to journalism ===
In 2009, Barsky returned to journalism. As chairman of the board of overseers of the Columbia Journalism Review, he encouraged the organization to play an important role in coming up with new business models. He similarly pushed the nonprofit Youth Communications to think about what projects would financially sustain the organization.

==== The Marshall Project ====
Barsky's interest in new models for journalism would eventually lead him to co-found The Marshall Project along with former New York Times executive editor Bill Keller. The project is a nonprofit journalism organization with a focus on criminal justice in the United States. First announced in November 2013 by Barsky, the project got Keller on board in February 2014. Former New York Times executive editor Bill Keller announced that he was joining the project as head of the editorial team. The project had two of its investigative journalism pieces published in Slate and the Washington Post respectively, and it launched in November 2014 with funding from Barsky and many other sources, including the Ford Foundation.

The organisation received two Pulitzer prizes while Barsky was at its helm. Barsky stepped down as chairman in late 2021.

=== Filmmaking ===
Barsky was inspired to work on documentaries after observing the success of Waiting for Superman and Gasland in sparking discussion about their respective underlying issues (charter schools and fracking). He produced and directed Koch, a documentary released in 2012 (and theatrically released February 2013) about the role that former New York City Mayor Ed Koch played in transforming the city in the 1980s. Barsky was co-executive producer and director of the documentary Knuckleball!, the short documentary Witnesses NYC, and the Koch episode in the TV series documentary POV.

== Journalistic focus ==
=== Donald Trump ===
Barsky has reported extensively on the business career of 45th President Donald Trump since 1985, mainly for The Wall Street Journal and The Daily News. He has interviewed Trump dozens of times over the course of his journalistic coverage. In 1991, Barsky won the Gerald Loeb Award for Deadline and/or Beat Writing for his "Coverage of the Collapse of Donald Trump's Financial Empire" while at The Wall Street Journal.

Trump threatened to sue Barsky multiple times over the course of his journalistic coverage, though he never followed through. Trump wrote of Barsky in his 1997 book, The Art of the Comeback, "Of all the writers who have written about me, probably none has been more vicious than Neil Barsky of the Wall Street Journal."

=== Rikers Island ===
Following numerous revelations about stark conditions in the New York City jail complex, Barsky wrote an opinion piece for the New York Times titled "Shut Down Rikers Island" (July 19, 2015). In the piece, Barsky argued that:

"the only way to transform Rikers is to destroy it; it needs to be permanently closed. The buildings are crumbling. The guard culture of prisoner abuse and the gang culture of violence are ingrained. The complex is New York's Guantánamo Bay: a secluded island, beyond the gaze of watchdogs, where the Constitution is no guide. It is a place that has outlived its usefulness."

In this piece, Barsky later made the case that "the closing of the country's most notorious jail would serve as a powerful message" for national criminal justice reform.

In March 2017, de Blasio announced his support for plans to close the Rikers Island complex through reducing the number of inmates from 10,000 to 5,000 and establishing a system of smaller jails in all five boroughs. These plans were released by an independent commission studying Rikers Island, created by City Council speaker Melissa Mark-Viverito. Previously, in February 2016, de Blasio had called the idea of shutting down Rikers Island a "noble concept," but described it as unrealistic due to the cost.
