= Ken Armstrong (journalist) =

American journalist

- Education: Nieman Fellow at Harvard University
- Occupation: Investigative journalist
- Employer: ProPublica
- Spouse: Ramona Hattendorf
- Children: Waters (Emmett), Skye
- Website: Official website

Ken Armstrong is a senior investigative reporter at ProPublica.

He has worked at The Marshall Project, the Chicago Tribune, The Seattle Times, the Newport News Daily Press, and the Anchorage Times. He was a 2001 Nieman Fellow at Harvard University, and in 2002, was the McGraw Professor of Writing at Princeton University.

He is married to Ramona Hattendorf; they live in Seattle with their two children, Waters (Emmett) and Skye.

== Awards ==
- 2016 Pulitzer Prize for Explanatory Reporting (with T. Christian Miller)
- 2012 Pulitzer Prize for Investigative Reporting (with Michael J. Berens)
- Shared in Pulitzer Prize for breaking news (2010, 2015)
- 2011 Edgar Award for non-fiction
- 2010 Michael Kelly Award
- 2009 John Chancellor Award Winner
- 2004 Excellence in Legal Journalism Award
- 1999; 2008; 2014; 2015 George Polk Award
- Investigative Reporters and Editors Award six times
- Pulitzer Prize finalist, four times

== Works ==
- (with T. Christian Miller) A False Report: A True Story of Rape in America. New York: Crown. 2018. ISBN 978-1-52-475993-3.
- Scoreboard, Baby: A Story of College Football, Crime, and Complicity, Ken Armstrong, Nick Perry, UNP, Bison Original, 2010, ISBN 978-0-8032-2810-8
- "'Until I Can Be Sure': How the Threat of Executing the Innocent has Transformed the Death Penalty Debate"
