= ProPublica =

US-based nonprofit investigative journalism organization

Pro Publica, Inc.
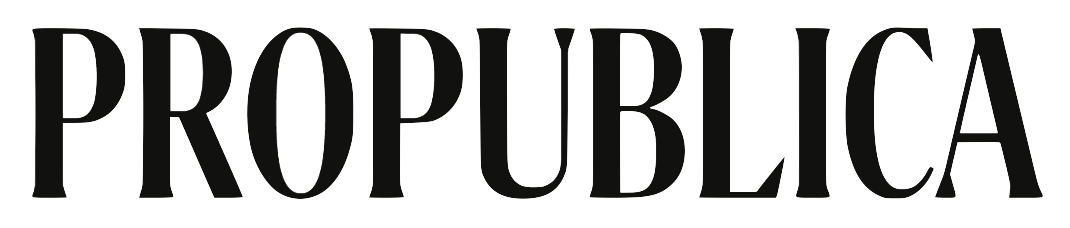
- Founded: 2007; 19 years ago
- Type: 501(c)(3)
- Tax ID no.: 14-2007220
- Purpose: Investigative journalism
- Location: Manhattan, New York City, U.S.
- Region served: United States
- Key people: Paul Steiger (executive chairman); Herbert Sandler (founding chairman); Stephen Engelberg (Editor-in-Chief); Robin Sparkman (president); Robin Fields (Managing Editor); Charles Ornstein (Managing Editor, Local)
- Revenue: ▲$58 million (2024)
- Expenses: ▲$44.1 million (2024)
- Employees: 209
- Volunteers: 15
- Website: www.propublica.org
- Pro Publica Inc - Nonprofit Explorer'

ProPublica, Inc. (/proʊˈpʌblɪkə/) is an American nonprofit investigative journalism organization based in New York City. ProPublica's investigations are conducted by its staff of full-time reporters, and the resulting stories are distributed to news partners for publication or broadcast. In some cases, reporters from both ProPublica and its partners work together on a story. ProPublica has partnered with more than 90 different news organizations and has won several Pulitzer Prizes.

In 2010, ProPublica became the first online news source to win a Pulitzer Prize; the story chronicled the urgent life-and-death decisions made by a New Orleans hospital's exhausted doctors when they were cut off by the floodwaters of Hurricane Katrina, and it was published both in the New York Times Magazine and on ProPublica's website.

== History ==
ProPublica was the brainchild of Herbert and Marion Sandler, the former chief executives of the Golden West Financial Corporation, who committed $10 million per year to the project. The Sandlers hired Paul Steiger, former managing editor of the Wall Street Journal, to create and run the organization as editor in chief.

At the time ProPublica was set up, Steiger responded to concerns about the impact of the left-leaning political views of the Sandlers, saying on the Newshour with Jim Lehrer:

Coming into this, when I talked to Herb and Marion Sandler, one of my concerns was precisely this question of independence and nonpartisanship ... My history has been doing "down the middle" reporting. And so when I talked to Herb and Marion I said, "Are you comfortable with that?" They said, "Absolutely." I said, "Well, suppose we did an exposé of some of the left leaning organizations that you have supported or that are friendly to what you've supported in the past." They said, "No problem." And when we set up our organizational structure, the board of directors, on which I sit and of which Herb is the chairman, does not know in advance what we're going to report on.

ProPublica had an initial news staff of 28 reporters and editors, including Pulitzer Prize winners Charles Ornstein, Tracy Weber, Jeff Gerth, and Marcus Stern. Steiger is reported to have received 850 applications after ProPublica's announcement. The organization appointed a 12-member advisory board of professional journalists.

The newsgroup shares its work under the Creative Commons no-derivative, non-commercial license.

On August 5, 2015, Yelp announced a partnership with ProPublica to bring improved healthcare data into Yelp's statistics on healthcare providers.

After unionizing in 2023, in April 2026, about 150 members of the ProPublica Guild went on strike for 24 hours over disagreements about job security, AI, and wage increases.

== Funding ==
While ProPublica has received significant financial support from the Sandler Foundation, it also has received funding from the Knight Foundation, MacArthur Foundation, Pew Charitable Trusts, Ford Foundation, the Carnegie Corporation, and the Atlantic Philanthropies. ProPublica and the Knight Foundation have various connections. For example, Paul Steiger, executive chairman of ProPublica, is a trustee of the Knight Foundation. Similarly, Alberto Ibarguen, the president and CEO of the Knight Foundation, is on the board of ProPublica. ProPublica, along with other major news outlets, received grant funding from Sam Bankman-Fried, the founder of cryptocurrency exchange FTX.

ProPublica has attracted attention for the salaries it pays employees. In 2008, Paul Steiger, the editor of ProPublica, received a salary of $570,000. Steiger was formerly the managing editor at The Wall Street Journal, where his total compensation (including options) was double that at ProPublica. Steiger's stated strategy is to use a Wall Street Journal pay model to attract journalistic talent. In 2010, eight ProPublica employees earned more than $160,000, including managing editor Stephen Engelberg ($343,463) and the highest-paid reporter, Dafna Linzer, formerly of the Washington Post ($205,445).

== Awards ==
In 2010, ProPublica jointly won the Pulitzer Prize for Investigative Reporting (with the Philadelphia Daily News for an unrelated story) for the story "The Deadly Choices at Memorial"; this "chronicles the urgent life-and-death decisions made by one hospital's exhausted doctors when they were cut off by the floodwaters of Hurricane Katrina." The story was written by ProPublica's Sheri Fink, and it was published in The New York Times Magazine as well as on the ProPublica website. This was the first Pulitzer Prize awarded to an online news source. The article also won the National Magazine Award for Reporting in 2010.

In 2011, ProPublica won its second Pulitzer Prize. Reporters Jesse Eisinger and Jake Bernstein won the Pulitzer Prize for National Reporting for their series, The Wall Street Money Machine. This was the first time a Pulitzer Prize was awarded to a group of stories not published in print.

In 2016, ProPublica won its third Pulitzer Prize, this one for Explanatory Reporting—in collaboration with The Marshall Project for "a startling examination and exposé of law enforcement's enduring failures to investigate reports of rape properly and to comprehend the traumatic effects on its victims."

In 2017, ProPublica and the New York Daily News were awarded the Pulitzer Prize for Public Service for a series of reports on the use of eviction rules by the New York City Police Department.

In 2019, the Peabody Awards honored ProPublica with the first-ever Peabody Catalyst Award; this was for releasing audio in 2018 that brought immediate change to a controversial government practice of family separation at the southern border.

Also in 2019, ProPublica reporter Hannah Dreier was awarded the Pulitzer Prize for Feature Writing; this was for her series that followed immigrants on Long Island whose lives were shattered by a botched crackdown on MS-13.

In May 2020, ProPublica won the Pulitzer Prize for Public Service for illuminating public safety gaps in Alaska.

In that same year, ProPublica also won the Pulitzer Prize for National Reporting; this prize was for coverage of the United States Navy, in particular the collisions of the USS Fitzgerald and USS John S. McCain (DDG-56) with civilian vessels in separate incidents in the western Pacific Ocean. The stories were written by T. Christian Miller, Megan Rose and Robert Faturechi.

In 2021 and 2022, ProPublica journalists Lisa Song and Mark Olalde won SEAL Awards for consistent excellence in environmental reporting.

In May 2024, ProPublica won the Pulitzer Prize for Public Service, for reporting on the billionaires who were giving gifts to the US Supreme Court's justices and paying their travel expenses. The stories were written by Joshua Kaplan, Justin Elliott, Brett Murphy, Alex Mierjeski and Kirsten Berg.

In July 2024, Mary Hudetz was presented with the Richard LaCourse Award for Investigative Journalism by the Indigenous Journalists Association for her work on ProPublica’s "The Repatriation Project." Her reporting, which focused on the complexities and obstacles in repatriating Native American remains and sacred objects from museums and universities, "had rippling effects at the institutional level down to Indigenous communities and peoples".

== Notable reporting and projects ==
=== "An Unbelievable Story of Rape" ===
T. Christian Miller of ProPublica and Ken Armstrong of The Marshall Project collaborated on this piece about the process that discovered a serial rapist in Colorado and Washington state. The piece won a 2016 Pulitzer Prize for Explanatory Reporting. This piece was adapted into the 2019 Netflix series Unbelievable.

=== Bias with COMPAS software ===
In 2016, ProPublica published an investigation of the COMPAS algorithm used by U.S. courts to assess the likelihood of a defendant becoming a recidivist. Led by Julia Angwin, the investigation found that "blacks are almost twice as likely as whites to be labeled a higher risk but not actually re-offend," whereas COMPAS "makes the opposite mistake among whites: They are much more likely than blacks to be labeled lower-risk but go on to commit other crimes." They also found that only 20 percent of people predicted to commit violent crimes actually went on to do so.

COMPAS developer Northpointe criticized ProPublica’s methodology, while a team at the Community Resources for Justice, a criminal justice think tank, published a rebuttal of the investigation's findings.

=== Psychiatric Solutions company ===
ProPublica conducted a large-scale, circumscribed investigation on Psychiatric Solutions, a company based in Tennessee that buys failing hospitals, cuts staff, and accumulates profit. The report covered patient deaths at numerous Psychiatric Solutions facilities, the failing physical plant at many of their facilities, and covered the State of Florida's first closure of Manatee Palms Youth Services, which has since been shut down by Florida officials once again. Their report was published in conjunction with the Los Angeles Times.

=== Documenting Hate project ===
In 2017, ProPublica launched the Documenting Hate project for systematic tracking of hate crimes and bias incidents. The project is part of their Civil Rights beat, and allows victims or witnesses of hate crime incidents to submit stories. The project also allows journalists and newsrooms to partner with ProPublica to write stories based on the dataset they are collecting. For example, the Minneapolis Star Tribune partnered with ProPublica to write about reporting of hate crimes in Minnesota.

=== Surgeon Scorecard database ===
In 2015, ProPublica launched Surgeon Scorecard, an interactive database that allows users to view complication rates for eight common elective procedures. The tool allows users to find surgeons and hospitals, and see their complication rates. The database was controversial, drawing criticism from doctors and prompting a critique from RAND. However, statisticians, including Andrew Gelman, stood behind their decision to attempt to shine light on an opaque aspect of the medical field, and ProPublica offered specific rebuttals to RAND's claims.

=== Tracking evictions and rent stabilization in New York City ===
ProPublica has created an interactive map that allows people to search for addresses in New York City to see the effects of eviction cases. The app was nominated for a Livingston Award.

=== Taxes paid by wealthiest Americans ===
In June 2021, after receiving leaked, hacked, or stolen IRS documents, ProPublica published a report which claimed that tax rates for the wealthiest Americans were significantly lower than the average middle class tax rate, if unrealized capital gains are considered as equivalent to earned income. ProPublica would later reveal that technology investor and political donor Peter Thiel legally earned more than $5 billion in a tax-free Roth IRA account through his investments in private companies. Attorney General Merrick Garland told lawmakers that investigating the source of the release would be a top priority for the Justice Department.

In October 2023, Charles E. Littlejohn pleaded guilty to the unauthorized disclosures of income tax returns.

=== Juvenile Court judge policies jail innocent black children ===
Research by ProPublica and Nashville Public Radio found juvenile incarcerations in Rutherford County, Tennessee, to be far higher than the national average. The investigation, published in October 2021 as "Black Children Were Jailed for a Crime That Doesn’t Exist. Almost Nothing Happened to the Adults in Charge", revealed that county authorities had charged some of the children under non-existent laws, as directed by Judge Donna Scott Davenport, and that, among Tennessee children referred to juvenile court, the statewide rate of incarceration was five percent, while in Rutherford County it was 48 percent. The article was a finalist in the 2022 National Magazine Awards. Reportage continued by podcast, with The Kids of Rutherford County.

=== Cancer-causing industrial air pollution map ===
In 2021, ProPublica published the results of a two-year analytical project involving examining billions of rows of Environmental Protection Agency (EPA) data to create a map to chart industrial pollution at the neighborhood level – the first of its kind. In five years' worth of EPA data, ProPublica identified over 1,000 toxic hotspots nationwide, estimating that 250,000 people living near these areas may have been exposed to levels of cancer risk that the EPA deems unacceptable. ProPublica intended to represent data in a way where the public can understand the risk of breathing the air where they live. Through the map, the town of Verona, Missouri was identified to have an industrial cancer risk 27 times larger than the acceptable value. Subsequently, the EPA agreed to install three air monitors to track ethylene oxide concentration in Verona. Additional "hot spots" identified on the map include the city of Longview in eastern Texas; the most high-risk area of Longview has a risk level 72 times greater than the EPA's acceptable risk. This most high-risk area is the home of Texas Eastman Chemical Plant. According to ProPublica, its analysis of the plant's emissions detected ethylene oxide and 1-3 butadiene. The Texas Eastman Chemical Plant says it has conducted its own tests which "have revealed no areas of concern."

=== Gina Haspel and subsequent retractions ===
In 2017, ProPublica published an investigative report detailing the involvement of Gina Haspel in enhanced interrogation techniques at a black site in Thailand. The report focused particularly on the harsh methods used on Abu Zubaydah, including waterboarding, confinement in small boxes, and wall slamming. In 2018, ProPublica retracted part of its 2017 report and said that Haspel had not taken over control of the black site until after Abu Zubaydah interrogation had ended. This retraction came after Haspel was nominated to lead the CIA, sparking renewed scrutiny of her record. The Associated Press (AP), The New York Times, NBC and The Atlantic made similar corrections to stories they had published about Haspel's time as head of the Thai black site.

=== The Repatriation Project ===
In 2023, ProPublica launched an investigative series uncovering the complexities and delays in repatriating Native American remains and cultural items under the 1990 Native American Graves Protection and Repatriation Act (NAGPRA). The series exposed institutional resistance from museums and universities, driving significant policy discussions and increased efforts toward compliance. This investigative work earned Mary Hudetz the Richard LaCourse Award for Investigative Journalism from the Indigenous Journalists Association in July 2024.

=== Local Reporting Network ===
Launched in 2018, the Local Reporting Network consists of partnerships with over 70 local news organizations. Partner organizations selected in 2024 include The Current in Georgia, Idaho Statesman, The Salt Lake Tribune, Street Roots in Oregon, and Tennessee Lookout. The network subsidizes salary and benefits for reporters, who must apply together with a local news organization. Work from the Network's partnership with the Anchorage Daily News won the 2020 Pulitzer Prize for Public Service.
