= The Marshall Project =

American nonprofit journalism organization

- Available in: English
- Creator: Neil Barsky
- Editors: Bill Keller (2014–2019); Susan Chira (2019–2025); Jennifer Peter (2025–present)
- President: Katrice Hardy
- Website: www.themarshallproject.org
- Registration: Non-profit
- Launched: November 2014; 12 years ago

The Marshall Project is an American nonprofit news organization which covers the U.S. criminal justice system with an aim to spread awareness of inequities and other issues in the justice system. It is named after lawyer and Supreme Court Justice Thurgood Marshall.

== History ==
The project was founded by former hedge fund manager and prison abolitionist Neil Barsky with former New York Times executive editor Bill Keller as its first editor-in-chief. The organization's name honors Thurgood Marshall, the NAACP's civil rights activist and attorney whose arguments won the landmark U.S. Supreme Court school desegregation case, Brown vs. Board of Education, who later became the first African-American justice of the Court.

The Marshall Project originated in November 2013. When writing an op-ed in The New York Times, Barsky mentioned the idea by including a brief description of the project and the website URL in his byline. In February 2014, The New York Times reported that Bill Keller, who had been executive editor at The New York Times from July 2003 to September 2011, was going to work for the Marshall Project. Barsky continued to work for The Marshall Project for seven years until announcing his resignation in October 2021.

The Marshall Project publishes journalistic and opinion pieces on its own website, and also collaborates with news organizations and magazines to publish investigations. Its first 2 investigations were published in August 2014 (for its own website and in The Washington Post together) and in October 2014 (for its own website and in Slate). It also publishes a weekly feature called "Life Inside" where people who work or live in the criminal justice system tell their stories in first-person essays. Until October 2018, Life Inside was co-published with VICE.

The project officially launched in November 2014. Its first editor-in-chief was former New York Times executive editor Bill Keller. The outlet's reporting in its first five years garnered it a Pulitzer Prize and other journalism awards, with reporting focused on various issues, including prison abuse and rape, privatized prisons, and the treatment of incarcerated youth and mentally ill people. Keller retired in 2019 and was succeeded as editor-in-chief by Susan Chira.

On February 29, 2024, The Marshall Project newsroom staff announced publicly that it was unionizing under the News Guild of New York.

In January 2025, Susan Chira stepped down from the role of editor-in-chief. The Marshall Project announced that Katrice Hardy will lead both the newsroom and business operations as CEO, alongside acting editor-in-chief Geraldine Sealey. Carroll Bogert also stepped down from the role of president in February 2025; "she had taken up", said role in 2016. The Marshall Project announced that Jennifer Peter would start as editor-in-chief in September 2025. As of January 2025, The Marshall Project had a staff of 82, five of whom are formerly incarcerated. The Marshall Project is funded by donations and grants from foundations and individuals.

== Critical reception ==
Joe Pompeo, a journalist at Capital magazine, wrote of The Marshall Project that it had a great start due to a mix of good initial publicity and association with high-profile names.

The Marshall Project has also been identified as part of a new and experimental non-profit journalism format. It has been compared with the non-profit ProPublica, the Center for Investigative Reporting, Inside Climate News, and The Texas Tribune, and also with for-profit journalistic experiments such as Vox and FiveThirtyEight.

The Marshall Project has also been compared with the Innocence Project, but distinguishes itself because its focus is not merely on innocent people ensnared by the criminal justice system but also on guilty people whose rights to due process, fair trial, and proportionate punishment are violated, and is considered an advocacy group by some.

=== Awards and honors ===
In 2016, The Marshall Project and partner ProPublica won the Pulitzer Prize for Explanatory Reporting for "An Unbelievable Story of Rape" described as "a startling examination and exposé of law enforcement's enduring failures to investigate reports of rape properly and to comprehend the traumatic effects on its victims". In 2019, this piece was adapted into the Netflix series Unbelievable.

Also in 2017, it was named as a collaborator (alongside ProPublica) when This American Life won a Peabody Award for "Anatomy of Doubt".

In 2018, The Marshall Project was awarded a national Edward R. Murrow Award for "Overall Excellence" for a small digital newsroom. It also won the award for General Excellence in Online Journalism from Online News Association. Its 2017 documentary series "We Are Witnesses" was nominated for the 39th Annual News & Documentary Emmy Award. Its 2019 installment of the "We Are Witnesses" series was nominated for the 41st Annual News & Documentary Emmy Award for "Outstanding New Approaches" in the documentary category.

The Marshall Project was awarded the Pulitzer Prize in National Reporting in 2021 for a yearlong investigation into injuries caused by police dog bites. The prize was shared with AL.com, IndyStar, and the Invisible Institute.

== See also ==
- Institute for Nonprofit News (member)
- Public criminology
