= Non-crime hate incident =

Classification in British policing records

In the United Kingdom, non-crime hate incidents (NCHIs) refer to actions or speech perceived to demonstrate hostility towards a person's protected characteristics, such as race, religion, sexual orientation, or disability. These incidents do not meet the threshold of a criminal offence. Nevertheless, these incidents were recorded in accordance with guidelines from the College of Policing, which define them as incidents perceived by the victim (or any other person) to be motivated by hostility.

Other Commonwealth countries use similar designations, such as hate-motivated incident, to differentiate between criminal and non-criminal acts. The Southern Poverty Law Center uses bias-motivated incident.

The Metropolitan Police announced it would stop investigating non-crime hate incidents to "reduce ambiguity" after prosecutors dropped the case against Graham Linehan following his arrest in September 2025. In the same month the chief inspector of constabulary said Police should no longer record or investigate non-crime hate incidents.

== History ==
One of the recommendations made by Sir William Macpherson as a result of his inquiry into the murder of Stephen Lawrence was that Police should record both hate crimes and non-criminal "hate incidents". As a result, in 2000, the Association of Chief Police Officers (ACPO) released a manual to guide police offers in recording hate crimes and in 2014, the College of Policing released its Hate Crime Operational Guidance that encouraged reporting non-crime hate incidents.

NCHIs were introduced as part of efforts to monitor and prevent hate crimes. They allow authorities to identify patterns of discriminatory behaviour, which might later escalate to criminal offences. The system also aims to offer reassurance to communities targeted by such behaviours. Police are required to record these incidents even when no crime has been committed, as long as they align with the perception-based criteria outlined by the College of Policing. The College of Policing first initiated NCHIs in 2014, advising police forces to begin keeping records of the incidents. The subjective nature of the NCHI complaint has led to incidents such as the playing of Bob Marley music, a Snapchat between schoolgirls, and the hanging of soiled underpants on a washing line to be recorded as NCHIs.

The guidelines for recording NCHIs were challenged in a landmark case in 2021, when the Court of Appeal ruled that their implementation must balance public safety with the protection of individual freedoms. The court found that the guidelines could have a "chilling effect" on free speech, requiring amendments to ensure proportionality in the reporting process. In December 2021, the Court of Appeal ruled that this guidance was unlawful and constituted a "chilling effect ... on the legitimate exercise of freedom of expression". As a result, the guidance now states that freedom of speech should be prioritised where possible and that non-crime hate incidents should not be recorded where they are "trivial, irrational or malicious, or where there is no basis to conclude that an incident was motivated by hostility."

The Police, Crime, Sentencing and Courts Act 2022 made statutory the code of practice for police recording of NCHIs.
