= Documenting Hate =

Project to track hate crimes and bias incidents

- Type of project: Journalism, data science
- Products: News and data on hate crimes and bias incidents
- Founder: ProPublica
- Country: United States of America
- Established: 17 January 2017
- Website: www.documentinghate.com

Documenting Hate is a project of ProPublica, in collaboration with a number of journalistic, academic, and computing organizations, for systematic tracking of hate crimes and bias incidents. It uses an online form to facilitate reporting of incidents by the general public. Since August 2017, it has also used machine learning and natural language processing techniques to monitor and collect news stories about hate crimes and bias incidents. As of October 2017, over 100 news organizations had joined the project.

== History ==
=== Origin ===
Documenting Hate was created in response to ProPublica's dissatisfaction with the quality of reporting and tracking of evidence of hate crimes and bias incidents after the United States presidential election of 2016. The project was launched on 17 January 2017, after the publication on 15 November 2016 of a ProPublica news story about the difficulty of obtaining hard data on hate crimes.

=== Introduction of the Documenting Hate News Index ===
On 18 August 2017, ProPublica and Google announced the creation of the Documenting Hate News Index, which uses the Google Cloud Natural Language API for automated monitoring and collection of news stories about hate crimes and bias incidents. The API uses machine learning and natural language processing techniques. The findings of the Index are integrated with reports from members of the public. The Index is a joint project of ProPublica, Google News Lab, and the data visualization studio Pitch Interactive.

== Response ==
=== Participation ===
As of May 2017, thousands of incidents had been reported via Documenting Hate. As of October 2017, over 100 news organizations had joined the project, including the Boston Globe, the New York Times, Vox, and the Georgetown University Hoya.

=== Relationship to government statistical monitoring ===
A policy analyst for the Center for Data Innovation (an affiliate of the Information Technology and Innovation Foundation), while supporting ProPublica's critique of the present state of hate-crime statistics, and praising ProPublica for drawing attention to the problem, has argued that a nongovernmental project like Documenting Hate cannot solve it unaided; instead, intervention at the federal level is needed.

== See also ==
- Unite the Right rally
