= Bias-motivated incident =

Act of hostility motivated by prejudice

A bias-motivated incident. or hate incident (UK: Non-crime hate incident) is an act of hostility motivated by racism, religious intolerance, or other prejudice. A bias incident is different from a hate crime in that it does not necessarily involve criminal activity. Examples include graffiti, verbal abuse, and distribution of hate group literature.

== On school campuses ==
Organizations such as the U.S. Community Relations Service, the Southern Poverty Law Center, and the Anti-Defamation League recommend that school administrators denounce bias incidents on their campuses regardless of whether a crime is committed. Reasons for having such a policy include preventing minor incidents from escalating into violence and protecting the reputation of the school and its surrounding community. Supporters of such policies say that they help maintain an atmosphere of civility in which people feel free to express themselves without fear of retaliation.

A response to a bias incident begins with the victim or a bystander reporting it to the school's administration. After receiving the report, a school official (often a campus police officer) may begin to collect evidence and offer physical and emotional support to the victim. The institution may issue a public statement in order to dispel rumors, calm tensions, and state that bias incidents are not tolerated. School leadership may hold an open meeting to discuss the incident. Diversity training events may be included during orientation programs in an effort to prevent bias incidents from happening in the future.

== Law enforcement ==
Even if there is no crime to prosecute, some jurisdictions encourage their citizens to report bias incidents to the police. Police officers can provide assistance to the victims, and some police departments are required to keep records of reported bias incidents.

== See also ==
- Documenting Hate
