= Hate Crime Statistics Act =

1990 Act of the United States Congress

- Long title: An Act to provide for the acquisition and publication of data about crimes that manifest prejudice based on certain group characteristics.
- Acronyms (colloquial): HCSA
- Nicknames: Hate Crime Statistics Act of 1990
- Enacted by: the 101st United States Congress
- Effective: April 23, 1990

Citations
- Public law: 101-275
- Statutes at Large: 104 Stat. 140

Codification
- Titles amended: 28 U.S.C.: Judiciary and Judicial Procedure
- U.S.C. sections amended: 28 U.S.C. § 534

Legislative history
- Introduced in the House as H.R. 1048 by John Conyers (D–MI) on February 22, 1989; Committee consideration by House Judiciary, Senate Judiciary; Passed the House on June 27, 1989 (368-47); Passed the Senate on February 8, 1990 (92-4 Roll call vote 13, via Senate.gov, in lieu of S. 419) with amendment; House agreed to Senate amendment on April 4, 1990 (402-18 Roll call vote 066, via Clerk.House.gov); Signed into law by President George H. W. Bush on April 23, 1990

The Hate Crime Statistics Act, 28 U.S.C. § 534 (HCSA), passed in 1990 and modified in 2009 by the Matthew Shepard and James Byrd, Jr. Hate Crimes Prevention Act, requires the Attorney General to collect data on crimes committed because of the victim's race, religion, disability, sexual orientation, or ethnicity. The bill was signed into law by George H. W. Bush, and was the first federal statute to "recognize and name gay, lesbian and bisexual people." Since 1992, the Department of Justice through one of its agencies, the FBI, has jointly published an annual report on hate crime statistics.

On November 16, 2020, the FBI released its 2019 Hate Crime Statistics Act (HCSA) report with the total number of reported hate crime incidents rising 2.7% to 7,317 (2019) from 7,120 (2018).
