= Theo Gavrielides =

Cyprus-born legal philosopher

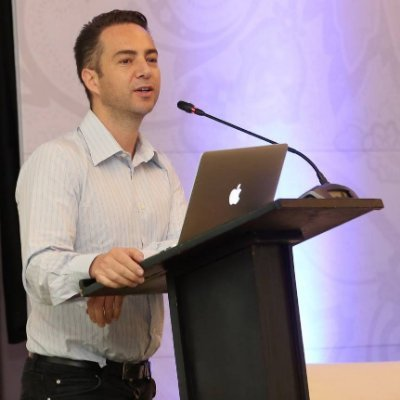

Theo Gavrielides (born Cyprus) is a human rights lawyer. He is the founder and director of the Restorative Justice for All International Institute (RJ4All).

His writings have influenced criminal justice and human rights scholars.

== Early life and education ==
Gavrielides was born in Cyprus and migrated to the UK during his teenage years. He defines as "Greek Londoner", and is the single parent of one boy. In 2005, Gavrielides received a PhD in Law (Restorative Justice) from the London School of Economics and Political Science. His doctoral thesis "Restorative Justice Theory and Practice: Addressing the Discrepancy" was published in 2007 by The European Institute for Crime Prevention and Control affiliated with the United Nations (HEUNI) and its second edition by RJ4All Publications. In 2000, he received a Masters in Human Rights Law from Nottingham University. He graduated from the Faculty of Laws of the National and Kapodistrian University of Athens.

Gavrielides was admitted to the Bar by the Bar Standards Board of England and Wales and called to the Bar (Middle Temple Inn) in 2023.

== Career ==
As a criminologist, he is interested in the role of Restorative Justice and how it can work alongside the criminal justice and youth justice systems.

Currently, he works as the Director of the Restorative Justice for All International Institute. Gavrielides is also the Editor-in-Chief of RJ4ALL publications. He is also the Editor-in-Chief of the peer reviewed publications Internet Journal of Restorative Justice (IJRJ) and the Youth Voice Journal (YVJ). Gavrielides is currently a visiting professor at Buckinghamshire New University.

In 2001, he founded The IARS International Institute, an international NGO promoting and protecting human rights for young people. After 20 years of running it as its director, he stepped down. In 2013, he created the Restorative Justice for All International Institute (RJ4All), a community-led NGO addressing power abuse through restorative justice. He is also the founder of RJ4All Sports and RJ4All Publications.

In the past, he served as a visiting professor at the School of Psychology of the University of East London, Distinguished Policy Fellow at the School of Regulation and Global Governance (REGNet), Australian National University and as an adjunct professor at the Centre for Restorative Justice of the School of Criminology of Simon Fraser University (Canada).

Previously, he was the Human Rights Advisor of the UK Ministry of Justice and the Chief Executive of Race on the Agenda (ROTA). He has served on boards including organisations such as the Anne Frank Trust, and the Community Scrutiny Panel of the Crown Prosecution Service. He was also the Editor-in-Chief of the International Journal of Human Rights in Healthcare for 11 years.

== Selected works ==
- Gavrielides, T. (2025), Addressing Violent Radicalisation and Extremism: A Restorative Justice & Psychosocial Approach, New York: Springer. ISBN 978-3-031-84031-9 | 978-3-031-84034-0 | 978-3-031-84032-6.
- Gavrielides, T. (2022). Introduction to Restorative Justice Art: four steps towards healing, London: RJ4All Publications. ISBN 978-1-911634-52-2. doi:10.13140/RG.2.2.29019.23848.
- Valez, G. and Gavrielides, T. (2022). Restorative Justice: Promoting Peace and Wellbeing, New York: Springer.
- Gavrielides, T. (2021). Comparative Restorative Justice, New York: Springer.
- Gavrielides, T. (2021). Power, Race & Justice: The restorative dialogue we won't have. Abingdon: Routledge. ISBN 978-1-4724-8835-0
- Gavrielides, T. (2020). Restorative Justice Theory and Practice: Addressing the Discrepancy, 2nd Edition London: RJ4All Publications, ISBN 978-1-911634-17-1.
- Gavrielides, T. (2018). "Victims and the restorative justice ambition: A London case study of potentials, assumptions and realities". Contemporary Justice Review: Issues in Criminal, Social, and Restorative Justice, pp. 1–22. https://doi.org/10.1080/10282580.2018.1488129
- Gavrielides, T. (2019). Collapsing the criminal labels of domestic violence: A social and restorative justice approach, London: RJ4All Publications.
- Gavrielides, T. (2016). “The death of democracy and the forces of power and control: The case of Europe”, Vol 5. Issue 3, Social Sciences Journal, Special Issue: Backlash: Contemporary Obstructions to Social Justice. p. 42. https://doi.org/10.3390/socsci5030042
- Gavrielides, T. (2016). “Repositioning Restorative Justice in Europe: The Victims’ Directive”, Victims & Offenders Vol. 11, Iss. 1, pp. 71–86. https://doi.org/10.1080/15564886.2015.1105342
- Gavrielides, T. (2013). Reconstructing restorative justice philosophy. Farnham, Surrey: Ashgate. ISBN 978-1-4094-7073-1.
- Gavrielides, T. (2012). Rights and Restoration Within Youth Justice. de Sitter Publications. ISBN 978-1-897160-62-6.
- Gavrielides, T. (2007) Restorative Justice Theory & Practice: Addressing the Discrepancy, HEUNI: Helsinki. ISBN 978-952-5333-32-9.
