= List of Barnard College people =

The following is a list of notable individuals associated with Barnard College through attendance as a student, service as a member of the faculty or staff, or as a recipient of the Barnard Medal of Distinction.

== Notable alumnae ==
=== Academics and scientists ===
- Anne Anastasi (1928), psychologist known for her pioneering development of psychometrics, former president of the American Psychological Association, recipient of the National Medal of Science
- Naomi André (1989), professor of music at the University of North Carolina at Chapel Hill
- Natalie Angier (1978), author, science journalist for The New York Times, winner of the Pulitzer Prize for Beat Reporting
- Nina Ansary (1989), historian, author, one of the six UN Women Champions for Innovation, daughter of Iranian diplomat and philanthropist Hushang Ansary
- Cicely Applebaum Ryshpan (1904–2004), economist who worked with labor unions, the US federal government, various United Nations agencies, and the World Bank
- Jacqueline Barton (1974), Caltech chemist and MacArthur Fellows Program "genius grant" winner
- Jean Baum (1980), Distinguished Professor of Chemistry and Chemical Biology at Rutgers University
- Annette Kar Baxter (1947), professor of history and American Studies at Barnard College (1952–1983), and pioneer in the study and teaching of Women's Studies
- Sally Benson (1977), professor of energy engineering at Stanford University
- Helen M. Berman (1964), Board of Governors; professor of Chemistry and Chemical Biology at Rutgers University
- Martha Biondi (1985), professor of African American studies at Northwestern University
- Joan Birman (1948), mathematician and winner of the Chauvenet Prize
- Hazel Bishop (1929), chemist and inventor of innovative cosmetics
- Edyta Bojanowska (1993), professor of Slavic languages and literature at Yale University
- Hendrika B. Cantwell (1944), clinical professor of pediatrics, advocate for abused and neglected children
- Margaret I. Carman (1890–1976), teacher at Flushing High School
- Marian Chertow (1977), academic specializing in environmental resource management
- Susan Cole (1962), first female president of Montclair State University
- Frances Gardiner Davenport (1890–1891), historian
- Stacey D'Erasmo (1983), author and critic, professor at Fordham University
- Jerrilynn Dodds (1973), art historian, former dean of Sarah Lawrence College
- Ingrith Johnson Deyrup-Olsen (1940), zoologist, daughter of The New School founder and first president Alvin Saunders Johnson
- Mabel Smith Douglass (1899), educator and namesake of Douglass Residential College of Rutgers University
- Carol Dweck (1967), professor of psychology at Stanford University
- Pam Eddinger (1982), president of Bunker Hill Community College
- Jessica Einhorn (1967), former dean of the Paul H. Nitze School of Advanced International Studies
- Hope Tisdale Eldridge (1925), physical educator, demographer and statistician at the United Nations
- Firth Haring Fabend (1959), novelist and historian
- Nancy Farriss (1959), historian, professor at the University of Pennsylvania
- Jessica Garretson Finch (1893), author, suffragette, founding president of Finch College
- Katherine Elizabeth Fleming (1987), provost of New York University
- Katherine Franke (1981), professor at Columbia Law School
- Ellen V. Futter (1971), president of Barnard College and the American Museum of Natural History
- Susan Gal (1970), anthropologist, professor at the University of Chicago
- Lynn Garafola (1968), dance historian
- Elizabeth Waterman Gilboy (1924), economist and economic historian
- Virginia Gildersleeve (1899), dean of Barnard College and delegate to the charter conference of the United Nations in 1945
- Karen Goldberg (1983), Vagelos Professor of Energy Research at the University of Pennsylvania
- Nieca Goldberg (1979), doctor at the NYU Langone Medical Center
- Rebecca Goldstein (1972), philosopher, biographer, and novelist
- Ruth Gottesman (1952), professor of pediatrics at Albert Einstein College of Medicine, philanthropist, wife of David Gottesman
- Monica Green (1978), medieval historian and professor of history at Arizona State University
- Maxine Greene (1938), educator, philosopher, activist; past president of the American Educational Research Association
- Patricia Greenspan (1966), professor of philosophy at the University of Maryland, College Park
- Miriam Griffin (1956), classical scholar at Somerville College, Oxford
- Ellen R. Gritz (1964), cancer researcher at the University of Texas MD Anderson Cancer Center
- Ruth T. Gross (1941), pediatrician, first woman to hold an endowed chair at Stanford University
- Evelyn Byrd Harrison (1941), classical scholar, archaeologist, fellow of the American Academy of Arts and Sciences
- Martha Himmelfarb (1974), scholar of religion, professor at Harvard University
- Louise Holland (1893–1990), academic, philologist and archaeologist
- Lise Morjé Howard (1991), political scientist, professor at Georgetown University
- Judith Herzfeld (1967), professor of Biophysical Chemistry at Brandeis University
- Evelyn Hu (1969), Gordon McKay Professor of Applied Physics and Electrical Engineering at Harvard University
- Jean Blackwell Hutson (1969), librarian, archivist, chief of the Schomburg Center for Research in Black Culture
- Karla Jay (1968), pioneer of lesbian and gay studies
- Madlyn M. Kahr (1913–2004; B.A. 1933), art historian and educator; professor at the University of California, San Diego
- Frances Kamm (1960), philosopher, professor at Rutgers University
- Darcy Kelley (1970), neurobiologist, professor at Columbia University
- Linda K. Kerber (1960), feminist intellectual historian, professor at the University of Iowa
- Mirra Komarovsky (1926), sociologist; pioneer in the sociology of gender
- Mabel Lang (1939), archeologist and professor at Bryn Mawr College
- Linda Laubenstein, MD (1969), HIV/AIDS researcher
- Sylvia Lavin (1982), professor at the Princeton University School of Architecture
- Janna Levin (1988), cosmologist and associate professor of Physics and Astronomy at Barnard College
- Helen Longino (1960), philosopher of science, professor at Stanford University
- Susan Lowey (1950), biophysicist and professor of the University of Vermont
- Susan Mailer (1971), psychoanalyst, writer, and academic, daughter of novelist Norman Mailer
- Joyce Lee Malcolm (1963), professor at Antonin Scalia Law School
- Rita Gunther McGrath (1981), business book author; Professor at the Columbia Business School
- Elizabeth M. McNally (1983), geneticist, professor at Northwestern University
- Eileen McNamara (1974), professor of journalism at Brandeis University; formerly Pulitzer Prize-winning columnist of The Boston Globe
- Margaret Mead (1923), anthropologist known for Coming of Age in Samoa
- Barbara Stoler Miller (1962), scholar of Sanskrit literature known for a translation of the Bhagavad Gita
- Nancy K. Miller (1961), literary scholar, feminist theorist and memoirist, professor at Graduate Center, CUNY
- Dorothy Miner (1926), art historian, curator at Walters Art Museum
- Gertrude Moakley (1926), librarian and Tarot scholar
- Margaret Good Myers (1920), economist, professor at Vassar College
- Cathryn Nagler (1979), immunologist, professor at the University of Chicago
- Eva Neer (1959), chemist, professor at Columbia University College of Physicians & Surgeons
- Gertrude Neumark (1948), physicist and former professor of Columbia University
- Elissa L. Newport (1969), psycholinguist, professor at Georgetown University
- Barbara Novak (1950), art historian at Barnard College, 1982 National Book Award for Nonfiction finalist
- Aihwa Ong (1974), anthropologist and professor at University of California, Berkeley and 2001 MacArthur Fellow
- Anne Paolucci (1947), Italian-American writer, dramatist, professor at St. John's University in New York
- Elsie Clews Parsons (1896), first woman elected president of the American Anthropological Association
- Esther Pasztory (1965), scholar of Pre-Columbian Art at Columbia University
- Marjorie Perloff (1953), professor of English at Stanford University
- Helen Perlstein Pollard (1967), archaeologist, ethnologist, Mesoamericanist scholar, professor of anthropology at MSU
- Helen Ranney (1941), first woman to lead a university department of medicine in the U.S., be president of the Association of American Physicians, or serve as a Distinguished Physician of the Veterans Administration
- Amy Richards (1992), American historian and feminist activist
- Ida Rolf (1916), biochemist, founder of Rolfing Structural Integration
- Barbara Rose (1957), art historian and founding director of the Katzen Arts Center at American University; first wife of artist Frank Stella
- Ora Mendelsohn Rosen (1956), cell biology researcher
- Louise Rosenblatt (1920s), influential literary theorist and educator
- Joan Ruderman (1969), professor at Harvard University
- Mavis Sanders (1987), research scholar
- Myriam Sarachik (1954), physicist, professor at the City College of New York and recipient of the Oliver E. Buckley Condensed Matter Prize in 2005
- Naomi Scheman (1968), philosopher and professor of Philosophy and Gender, Women's and Sexuality Studies
- Kim Lane Scheppele (1975), political scientist, professor at Princeton School of Public and International Affairs
- Rose Grundfest Schneider (1929), medical researcher, hematologist, geneticist and educator
- Anna Schwartz (1933), economist
- Megumi Yamaguchi Shinoda (1908), first Asian American woman to graduate from Columbia University Vagelos College of Physicians and Surgeons and one of the first women of Japanese ancestry in the United States to receive a Doctor of Medicine degree
- Shuly Rubin Schwartz (1988), first female chancellor of the Jewish Theological Seminary of America
- Anne A. Scitovsky (1937), health economist, former member of the President's Commission for the Study of Ethical Problems in Medicine and Biomedical and Behavioral Research
- Susan C. Scrimshaw (1967), medical anthropologist, former president of Simmons University and The Sage Colleges
- Samah Selim (1986), professor of Arabic literature at Rutgers University
- Louise Slade (1968), food scientist
- Vivian Sobchack (1961), cultural critic
- Maya Soetoro-Ng (1993), educator; half-sister of President Barack Obama
- Emma Dietz Stecher (1925), organic chemist and Barnard College professor
- Judith E. Stein (1965), art historian and curator
- Barbara J. Stoll (1971), former dean of the University of Texas Health Science Center at Houston
- Barbara Lerner Spectre (1964), academic and scholar on Jewish studies
- Amy Sueyoshi (1993), historian and academic
- Susan Rubin Suleiman (1960), professor of French literature at Harvard University
- Hessy Levinsons Taft (1955), chemistry professor at St. John's University in New York
- Abigail Thernstrom (1958), political scientist and conservative scholar on race relations, voting rights and education who served on the United States Commission on Civil Rights
- Erin L. Thompson (2002), professor of art at John Jay College of Criminal Justice
- Judith Jarvis Thomson (1950), philosopher and professor at Massachusetts Institute of Technology
- Merryl Tisch (1977), educator, chancellor, New York State Board of Regents; wife of James S. Tisch, heir to the Loews Corporation
- Nim Tottenham (1996), professor of psychology at Columbia University
- Jessie Ann Owens (1971), professor of music at University of California, Davis
- Diane E. Pataki (1993), professor at the University of Utah and recipient of the James B. Macelwane Medal in 2008
- Lila Wallis (1947), physician, former president of the American Medical Women's Association and pioneer in women's health
- Beatrice Warde (1920s), calligrapher, librarian, researcher on typography
- Katherine Brehme Warren (1930), geneticist and scientific editor
- Susan Weber (1977), professor of Bard Graduate Center; wife of George Soros
- Helen L. Webster (1853–1928), philologist and educator
- Judith Weisenfeld (1986), scholar of Afro-American religion, professor at Princeton University
- Karen Wilkin (1962), art critic and curator
- Irene J. Winter (1960), art historian, professor at Harvard University
- Leona Zacharias (1927), biologist and medical researcher

=== Actresses and performers ===
- Sissy Biggers (1979), host of Ready.. Set... Cook! 1996–2000
- Franziska Boas (1923), dancer, percussionist and dance therapist
- Clara Bryant (2007), actress
- Catherine de Castelbajac (1975), model and fashion journalist
- Michelle Collins (2002), comedian and talk show host, former presenter of The View
- Jill Eikenberry (1968), actress
- Denise Faye (1996), director, choreographer, actress
- Greta Gerwig (2006), actress, screenwriter, filmmaker who won the Golden Globe Award for Best Motion Picture – Musical or Comedy in 2018 and was nominated for two Academy Awards
- Jaime Gleicher (2010), reality star, producer, psychotherapist
- Lauren Graham (1988), actress, played Lorelai Gilmore on TV show Gilmore Girls
- Sprague Grayden (2000s), actress, played Judith Montgomery on Joan of Arcadia
- Alexandra Guarnaschelli (1991), celebrity chef at Butter Restaurant in New York City, television personality
- Anshula Kapoor (2012), daughter of Indian film producer Boney Kapoor and member of the Kapoor family in Hindi cinema
- Shari Lewis (dropped out – 1950s), ventriloquist, puppeteer, television show host
- Mozhan Marnò (2001), actress, House of Cards
- Peggy McCay (1949), actress
- Kelly McCreary (2003), actress, Grey's Anatomy
- Julie Mond (2000s), actress
- Cynthia Nixon (1988), actress, played Miranda Hobbes on TV show Sex and the City
- Chelsea Peretti (2000), actress, writer for TV show Parks and Recreation
- Lee Remick (dropped out – 1953), actress
- Ariane Rinehart (2015), actress, played Liesl on The Sound of Music Live!
- Joan Rivers (1954), star comedian, TV host
- Christy Carlson Romano (2009), actress, voice of Kim Possible
- Frankie Shaw (2007), actress on Mr. Robot
- Vinessa Shaw (dropped out – 1990s), actress, 40 Days and 40 Nights
- Leslie Stefanson (1993), actress, The General's Daughter
- Zuzanna Szadkowski (2001), actress, played Dorota on TV show Gossip Girl
- Sophia Takal (2007), actress and director
- Twyla Tharp (1963), choreographer, dancer
- Sarah Thompson (1990s), television actress
- Donna Vivino (2000), actress and singer
- Jane Wyatt (1932), Emmy Award-winning actress, Father Knows Best

=== Architects ===
- Carole Rifkind (1956), architectural critic, historian, and author, wife of cancer researcher Richard Rifkind
- Norma Merrick Sklarek (1950), first black woman to be licensed as an architect in the United States

=== Artists ===
- Afruz Amighi (1997), Iranian-born American sculptor, installation artist
- March Avery (1954), painter, daughter of artist Milton Avery
- Sana Amanat (2005), comic book creator and director at Marvel Comics, creator of Marvel's first Muslim female superhero, Ms. Marvel
- Polly Barton (1978), textile artist
- Susan Bee (1973), painter
- Sarah Charlesworth (1969), photographer and conceptual artist and professor at Princeton University
- Madeline Hollander (2008), artist and choreographer
- Amy Hwang (2000), Asian-American cartoonist for The New Yorker
- Clermont Huger Lee (1936), landscape architect, Savannah Women of Vision
- Michelle Lopez (1992), sculptor and installation artist and 2019 Guggenheim Fellowship recipient
- Jesse Mockrin (2003), artist
- Maud Morgan (1926), modern artist
- Josephine Paddock (1949), painter
- Jane Teller (1933), sculptor and recipient of the 1988 Women's Caucus for Art Lifetime Achievement Award
- Mierle Laderman Ukeles (1961), performance artist, winner of the 2001 Anonymous Was A Woman Award
- Donna Zakowska (1975), Emmy Award-winning American costume designer for her work on John Adams

=== Athletes ===
- Stacey Borgman (1993), member of crew team for the United States at the 2004 Olympics
- Gloria Callen (1946), swimmer and Associated Press Athlete of the Year of 1942
- Abby Marshall (2014), chess player; won 2009 Denker Tournament of High School Champions
- Alexis Sablone (2008), skateboarder and architect
- Erinn Smart (2001), fencer for the United States at the 2004 Olympics silver medalist in team foil fencing at the Beijing 2008 Olympics
- Robin Wagner (1980), figure-skating coach

=== Businesswomen ===
- Flora Miller Biddle (attended), former president of the Whitney Museum of American Art, granddaughter of Gertrude Vanderbilt Whitney
- Joan Breibart (1963), Pilates instructor, inventor, writer, and entrepreneur
- Eileen Ford (1943), co-founder of Ford Models, one of the world's oldest and most influential modeling agencies
- Phyllis E. Grann (1958), first female CEO of Penguin Putnam and editor of Knopf Doubleday
- Elinor Guggenheimer (1933), civic leader, philanthropist
- Alexandra Creel Goelet (1974), heiress, niece of Robert David Lion Gardiner, wife of Robert Guestier Goelet and owner of Gardiners Island
- Nina Griscom (1977), model, television host, socialite, businesswoman, stepdaughter of Felix Rohatyn
- Mary Harriman Rumsey (1905), founder of nonprofit organization Junior League, daughter of railroad magnate E. H. Harriman and sister to New York Governor W. Averell Harriman
- Anjli Jain (2003), executive director of CampusEAI Consortium
- Madeline Kripke (1943–2020), book collector
- Harriet Burton Laidlaw (1902), suffragist and first female corporate director of Standard & Poor's
- Adele Lewisohn Lehman (1903), philanthropist and member of the Lehman family, daughter-in-law of Mayer Lehman
- Liz Neumark (1977), founder and CEO of New York catering company Great Performances
- Sheila Nevins (1960), president of HBO documentary films; winner of 27 Primetime Emmy Awards and 3 Peabody Awards
- Joan Whitney Payson (1925), co-founder and majority of owner of the New York Mets, granddaughter of United States Secretary of State John Hay and member of the Whitney family
- Azita Raji (1983), investment banker, U.S. ambassador to Sweden
- Helen Rogers Reid (1903), newspaper publisher, president of the New York Herald Tribune
- Phyllis Robinson (1942), executive at Doyle Dane Bernbach
- Cindy Rose (1985), president of Microsoft Western Europe
- Devorah Rose (2002), socialite, entrepreneur and editor of Social Life magazine
- Alexis Stewart (1987), daughter of Martha Stewart '64; TV host and radio personality
- Martha Stewart (1964), business magnate, entrepreneur, homemaking advocate
- Iphigene Ochs Sulzberger (1914), heiress, and owner of The New York Times, daughter of The New York Times publisher Adolph Ochs
- Elizabeth Wiatt (1967), businesswoman in the fashion industry
- Virginia Wright (1951), art collector, philanthropist who supported Seattle Art Museum

=== Journalists ===
- Natalie Angier (1978), science writer for The New York Times; won the Pulitzer Prize for beat reporting in 1991
- Jami Bernard (1978), film critic for The New York Post and The New York Daily News, founder of Barncat Publishing Inc.; writer whose books include a memoir of surviving breast cancer
- Katherine Boo (1988), recipient of Pulitzer Prize for Public Service in 2000 and the MacArthur Fellows Program "genius grant"
- Mona Charen (1979), nationally syndicated columnist, political analyst, and author
- Liz Clarke (1983), journalist for The Washington Post, co-host of The Tony Kornheiser Show
- Herawati Diah (1941), journalist
- Deborah Feyerick (1987), journalist and CNN correspondent
- Laura Flanders (1984), correspondent for Air America and host of GritTV
- Sylvana Foa (1967), first female news director of an American television network; first spokeswoman for Secretary General of the United Nations
- Rana Foroohar (1992), columnist for the Financial Times
- Alexis Gelber (1974), former president of the Overseas Press Club
- Julianna Goldman (2003), CBS News correspondent
- Piri Halasz, correspondent for Time magazine and art critic
- Maria Hinojosa (1984), correspondent for CNN; NOW on PBS; host of NPR's Latino USA
- Cathy Horyn, fashion journalist, New York Times fashion critic
- Freda Kirchwey (1915), journalist, editor and publisher of The Nation
- Alex Kuczynski (1990), style reporter for The New York Times, daughter of Peruvian president Pedro Pablo Kuczynski
- Minna Lewinson (1918), journalist for The New York Times, first woman to win a Pulitzer Prize
- Juliet Macur (1992), national correspondent and sports journalist for The New York Times
- Courtney E. Martin (2002), feminist writer and editor of the feminist blog Feministing
- Agnes E. Meyer (1907), journalist, philanthropist, civil rights activist, and art patron, mother of The Washington Post publisher Katharine Graham
- Judith Miller (1969), former correspondent for The New York Times who reported on the story of Iraq's alleged weapons of mass destruction program; Aspen Strategy Group member
- Nonnie Moore (c. 1946), fashion editor at Mademoiselle, Harper's Bazaar and GQ
- Mary Ellis Peltz, music critic, poet, and first chief editor of Opera News
- Anna Quindlen (1974), columnist for Newsweek who won the Pulitzer Prize for Commentary in 1992
- Paola Ramos (2009), journalist, daughter of TV anchor Jorge Ramos
- Atoosa Rubenstein (1993), founder of CosmoGirl and editor-in-chief of Seventeen; youngest-ever editor of a teen magazine
- Susan Stamberg (1959), special correspondent, NPR's Morning Edition, former host of All Things Considered, first woman in the United States to anchor a national nightly news program
- Mary V. R. Thayer (1926), socialite and journalist
- Jeannette Walls (1984), gossip columnist for MSNBC; author of The Glass Castle
- Sharon Waxman (born c.1963), journalist
- Beverly Weintraub (1982), Pulitzer Prize-winning editorial writer for the New York Daily News
- Lis Wiehl (1983), legal analyst for Fox News
- Ellen Willis (1960s), essayist and pop music critic
- Julie Zeilinger (2015), feminist writer and editor

=== Musicians ===
- Laurie Anderson (1969), musician, NASA's first artist-in-residence and pioneer in electronic music, known for her single "O Superman"
- Sadie Dupuis (2011), vocalist for Speedy Ortiz
- Amanda Harberg (1992), composer notable for Piccolo Concerto
- Dorothy Papadakos (1982), concert organist, playwright, and author
- Louise Post, lead singer and guitarist of alternative rock band Veruca Salt
- Roxanne Seeman (1975), songwriter
- Faye-Ellen Silverman (1968), composer
- Jeanine Tesori (1983), Broadway composer
- Suzanne Vega (1981), singer-songwriter, "Luka", "Tom's Diner"

=== Playwrights, screenwriters, and directors ===
- Jamie Babbit (1993), director of But I'm a Cheerleader and Itty Bitty Titty Committee, and television shows including Gilmore Girls, Alias, and Ugly Betty
- June Bingham Birge (1940), author, playwright, great-granddaughter of Mayer Lehman
- Debra Black (1976), Tony Award-winning producer, wife of Apollo Global Management co-founder Leon Black
- Petra Costa (2006), Academy Award-nominated director, The Edge of Democracy, heiress to the Andrade Gutierrez fortune
- Helen Deutsch (1927), screenwriter, Lili, National Velvet, King Solomon's Mines
- Delia Ephron (1966), author, screenwriter, playwright, The Sisterhood of the Traveling Pants, You've Got Mail
- Greta Gerwig (2006), actor, screenwriter, and Academy Award-nominated director, Lady Bird, Little Women
- Stephanie Gillis (1990), writer; won WGA Award, Peabody Award for The Simpsons
- Maria Semple (1986), screenwriter, Arrested Development, Mad About You
- Bettina Gilois (1985), screenwriter, Bessie, McFarland, USA
- Gina Gionfriddo (1991), Pulitzer Prize-nominated playwright
- Naomi Foner Gyllenhaal (1966), Golden Globe Award-winning screenwriter; mother of Maggie and Jake Gyllenhaal
- Kait Kerrigan (2003), playwright
- Bonnie Sherr Klein (1961), filmmaker and activist
- Annie Leonard (1986), activist and director, The Story of Stuff
- Ntozake Shange (1970), Obie Award-winning playwright, For Colored Girls Who Have Considered Suicide / When the Rainbow Is Enuf
- Veena Sud (1989), director of Seven Seconds
- Amy Talkington (1993), Emmy Award-nominated screenwriter, producer, writer
- Juli Weiner (2010), Emmy Award-winning writer, Last Week Tonight with John Oliver
- Linda Yellen (1969), Emmy Award-winning director, Northern Lights; producer, Playing for Time

=== Political, social and judicial figures ===
- Sheila Abdus-Salaam (1974), judge of the New York Court of Appeals
- Ann Aldrich (1948), judge of the United States District Court for the Northern District of Ohio
- Elizabeth Moore Aubin (1987), nominee to serve as the U.S. ambassador to Algeria
- Caroline Lexow Babcock (1904), co-founder of the Women's Peace Union and former secretary of the National Woman's Party
- Grace Lee Boggs (1935), author and political activist
- Margot Botsford (1969), associate justice of the Massachusetts Supreme Judicial Court
- Janet Lee Bouvier (1929), socialite and mother of Jacqueline Kennedy Onassis
- Claire C. Cecchi (1986), judge of the United States District Court for the District of New Jersey
- Miriam Goldman Cedarbaum (1952), United States District Court judge
- Hagar Chemali, political satirist, writer, producer, television personality, and political commentator
- Nora Hsiung Chu (1926), Chinese educator who served on the United Nations Commission on the Status of Women
- Ellie Cohanim (1995), broadcast journalist and deputy Special Envoy to Monitor and Combat Anti-Semitism
- Lucy Kramer Cohen (1928), civil servant and anthropologist
- Sharon L. Cromer (1980), nominee to serve as U.S. ambassador to the Gambia
- Mindy Domb (1981), representative of the Massachusetts House of Representatives' 3rd Hampshire district
- Ronnie Eldridge (1952), activist, businesswoman, politician, and television host
- Debra Evenson (1964), legal expert, lawyer, and educator
- Chai Feldblum (1979), commissioner of the Equal Employment Opportunity Commission
- Lila Fenwick (1953), first black woman to graduate from Harvard Law School and former United Nations official
- Muriel Fox (1948), public relations executive who in 1966 co-founded the National Organization for Women and led the communications effort that introduced the modern women's movement to the media of the world
- Paula Franzese (1980), professor of real property law at Seton Hall Law School
- Paulina Mangubat (1995), political strategist and high-ranking member of the Democratic National Committee
- Helen Gahagan (1924), United States House of Representatives congresswoman from California
- E. Susan Garsh (1969), associate justice of the Massachusetts Superior Court
- Helene D. Gayle, M.D., M.P.H. (1970), president and CEO of CARE USA and chair of the Presidential Advisory Council on HIV/AIDS
- Nancy Gertner (1967), judge on United States District Court for the District of Massachusetts
- Ellen F. Golden (1968), director, Women's Business Center, Coastal Enterprises, Inc., Wiscasset, Maine
- Diane Gujarati (1990), lawyer, judge of the United States District Court for the Eastern District of New York
- Betty Hall (1943), New Hampshire state representative
- Cheryl Halpern (1975), chair of the Corporation for Public Broadcasting
- Patricia McMahon Hawkins (attended), U.S. ambassador to Togo 2008–2011
- Allegra "Happy" Haynes (1975), Denver politician who served on the Denver City Council
- Susan Herman (1968), president of the American Civil Liberties Union; professor at Brooklyn Law School
- Marian Blank Horn (1965), judge on the United States Court of Federal Claims
- Jessie Wallace Hughan (1898, Phi Beta Kappa), United States Senate candidate, author, teacher, founder of Alpha Omicron Pi fraternity
- Mila Jasey (1972), member of the New Jersey General Assembly representing the 27th Legislative District
- Helene L. Kaplan (1953), lawyer with Skadden, Arps, Slate, Meagher & Flom, former chairman of the Carnegie Corporation of New York
- Judith Kaye (1958), first woman in highest position in state judiciary, chief judge of the New York Court of Appeals
- Katherine Kazarian (2012), member of the Rhode Island House of Representatives
- Claire R. Kelly (1987), judge on the United States Court of International Trade
- Christina Kishimoto (1992), superintendent of the Hawai'i Department of Education
- Jeane Kirkpatrick (1948), first woman to serve as U.S. ambassador to the United Nations
- Phyllis Lamphere (1943), former president of the Seattle City Council and the National League of Cities
- Linda Lee (2001), member of the New York City Council from the 23rd district
- Mabel Ping-Hua Lee (1916), Chinese advocate for women's suffrage in the United States and the first woman to receive a PhD from Columbia University
- Wilma B. Liebman (1971), chair, National Labor Relations Board
- Catherine McCabe (1973), acting administrator of the Environmental Protection Agency in 2017 and commissioner of the New Jersey Department of Environmental Protection
- Loretta J. Mester (1980), 11th president of the Federal Reserve Bank of Cleveland
- Shirah Neiman (1965), deputy U.S. attorney and chief counsel U.S. Attorney's Office for the Southern District of New York
- Herminia Palacio (1983), former deputy mayor of New York City and CEO of Guttmacher Institute
- Hope Portocarrero (1950), first lady of Nicaragua, wife of Anastasio Somoza Debayle
- Stephanie Garcia Richard (1996), New Mexico Commissioner of Public Lands; former member of the New Mexico House of Representatives
- Paula Reimers (1969), rabbi, political activist for Palestinian rights, gender equity, and religious freedom
- Rosalyn Richter (1976), associate justice of the Appellate Division of the New York Supreme Court, First Judicial Department
- Ramona Romero (1985), former general counsel of the United States Department of Agriculture, general counsel of Princeton University
- Rhea Suh (1992), assistant secretary of the United States Department of the Interior and former president of the Natural Resources Defense Council
- Marguerite Engler Schwarzman (1914), educator, activist for affordable housing, senior citizens
- Nina Shaw (1976), talent attorney whose clients include Jamie Foxx and Nick Cannon
- Shirley Adelson Siegel (1937), housing activist and advocate
- Madeline Singas (1988), district attorney for Nassau County, New York
- Jessica Stern (1985), policy consultant on terrorism who served on the United States National Security Council under Bill Clinton
- Audrey Strauss (1968), acting United States attorney for the Southern District of New York, replacing Geoffrey Berman
- Anna Diggs Taylor (1954), United States District Court judge
- Kang Tongbi (1907), daughter of Kang Youwei and political activist, member of the Chinese People's Political Consultative Conference
- Gloria Tristani (1974), former commissioner of the Federal Communications Commission, granddaughter of Senator Dennis Chávez
- Polly Trottenberg (1986), United States deputy secretary of Transportation and former commissioner of the New York City Department of Transportation
- Anne Warburton (1946), first female British ambassador, British ambassador to Denmark 1976–1983, and British permanent representative to the United Nations in Geneva 1983–1985; president of Lucy Cavendish College, Cambridge University 1985–1994
- Barbara M. Watson (1943), first woman to serve as an assistant secretary of state, U.S. ambassador to Malaysia
- Helene White (1975), judge on the United States Court of Appeals for the Sixth Circuit
- Constance H. Williams (1966), Pennsylvania state senator 2001–2009; daughter of Leon Hess, founder of the Hess Corporation
- Emma Wolfe (2001), deputy mayor of New York City and chief of staff to Bill de Blasio
- Alice Wolfson, activist and attorney who specializes in women's health
- Mae Yih (1951), member of the Oregon House of Representatives and Oregon State Senate, first Chinese American to serve in a state senate in the United States

=== Religious figures ===
- Sara Hurwitz (1999), first woman to serve as a rabba in the Orthodox Jewish clergy
- Sharon Kleinbaum (1981), rabbi and leader of Congregation Beit Simchat Torah
- Joy Levitt (1989), first female leader of the Reconstructionist Rabbinical Association

=== Spies ===
- Marion Davis Berdecio (1943), accused Soviet spy in U.S. State Department, comrade of Coplon and Wovschin
- Judith Coplon (1943), Soviet spy in U.S. Justice Department whose convictions were overturned on technicalities
- Virginia Hall (1927), spy with the Special Operations Executive during WWII
- Juliet Stuart Poyntz (1907), involved in intelligence activities for the Soviet OGPU; founding member of the Communist Party USA
- Patricia Warner (1949), spy and Congressional Gold Medal recipient
- Flora Wovschin (1943), Soviet spy in U.S. State Department, stepdaughter of Columbia professor/Soviet spy Enos Wicher

=== Writers ===
- Joan Abelove (1966), writer
- Léonie Adams (1923), poet
- Susan Mary Alsop (attended), Washingtonian socialite and writer
- Mary Antin (1902), author of the immigrant experience
- Charlotte Armstrong (1925), writer
- Lura Beam (1908), writer and educator
- Elizabeth Benedict (1976), novelist, journalist, and editor
- Jami Bernard (1978), writer and film critic
- Fatima Bhutto (2004), poet and writer; granddaughter of Pakistani president Zulfikar Ali Bhutto and member of the Bhutto family
- Ann Brashares (1989), author of The Sisterhood of the Traveling Pants
- Rachel M. Brownstein, literary critic, author, and academic
- Sasha Cagen (1996), writer
- Hortense Calisher (1932), writer
- Diana Chang (1949), pioneering Asian-American novelist
- Cassandra Clare (1995), author of The Mortal Instruments
- Melissa Clark (1990), cookbook writer and 2018 James Beard Foundation Award recipient
- Rachel Cohn (1989), author of Nick & Norah's Infinite Playlist and Gingerbread
- Nadine Jolie Courtney (2002), Bravo TV personality Newlyweds: The First Year; author of Beauty Confidential and Confessions of a Beauty Addict
- Elise Cowen (1956), poet of the Beat Generation
- Galaxy Craze (1993), novelist
- Susan Daitch (1977), short story writer
- Edwidge Danticat (1990), writer
- Lydia Davis (1970), short story writer, essayist, winner of the International Booker Prize
- Thulani Davis (1970), novelist who won a Grammy Award in 1992
- Tory Dent (1981), poet and HIV/AIDS activist
- Babette Deutsch (1917), poet, translator and critic
- Marjorie Housepian Dobkin (1944), author; Barnard College professor and dean
- Avni Doshi (2005), writer who was shortlisted for the 2020 Booker Prize
- Francine du Plessix Gray (1952), Pulitzer Prize-nominated writer
- Hallie Ephron (1969), novelist
- Cristina García (1983), author of Dreaming in Cuban
- Karina Yan Glaser, children's author
- Mary Gordon (1971), writer and professor of English at Barnard College
- Alexis Pauline Gumbs (2004), writer, poet, activist
- Indrani Aikath Gyaltsen (1970s), writer
- Monique Raphel High (1969), novelist
- Patricia Highsmith (1940), author of The Talented Mr. Ripley and The Price of Salt
- Anne Hollander (1952), historian of fashion
- Nansook Hong (1991), writer, daughter-in-law of Unification church founder Sun Myung Moon
- Helen Hoyt (1900s), poet
- Zora Neale Hurston (1928), Harlem Renaissance writer
- Elizabeth Janeway (1935), critic
- Joyce Johnson (1955), writer, Minor Characters
- June Jordan (1957), writer and activist
- Erica Jong (1963), writer
- Molly Jong-Fast (1997, according to her, although it appears she only attended a summer program for high school students), writer
- Alexa Junge (1984), writer for The West Wing and Friends
- Joan Kahn (late 1930s), mystery editor and anthologist; also novelist and children's writer
- Mary Beth Keane (1999), writer and 2015 Guggenheim fellow
- Jolie Kerr (1998), writer and podcast host on Heritage Radio Network
- Loolwa Khazzoom (1991), journalist and activist
- Suki Kim (1992), Guggenheim fellow; author of the award-winning novel The Interpreter and The New York Times bestselling literary nonfiction book, Without You, There Is No Us: Undercover Among the Sons of North Korea's Elite
- Lily Koppel (2003), author of The Red Leather Diary and The Astronaut Wives Club; writer for the New York Times
- Jhumpa Lahiri (1989), Pulitzer Prize–winning author of The Namesake and Interpreter of Maladies
- Jane Leavy (1974), sports biographer
- Kyle Lukoff (2006), transgender children's book writer; Storytelling of Ravens and When Aidan Became a Brother
- Florence Ripley Mastin (born 1886), poet.
- Faith McNulty (1920s, attended one year), writer
- Daphne Merkin (1975), literary critic, essayist, and novelist, daughter of philanthropist Hermann Merkin
- Alice Duer Miller (1899), writer and advisory editor of The New Yorker
- Ottessa Moshfegh (2002), 2016 Hemingway Foundation/PEN Award winner for Eileen
- Diana Muir (1975), writer and historian
- Alana Newhouse (1997), writer and editor of Tablet Magazine
- Alice Notley (1967), poet
- Sigrid Nunez (1972), novelist, Whiting Awards and the 2018 National Book Award for Fiction recipient
- Iris Owens (1929–2008), novelist
- Edie Parker (1940s), writer; first wife of Jack Kerouac
- Helena Percas de Ponseti (1940), essayist, scholar, and professor
- Chelsea Peretti (2000), writer and comedian
- Marisha Pessl (2000), author of Special Topics in Calamity Physics
- Julia Phillips (2010), author, Disappearing Earth and finalist for the 2019 National Book Award for Fiction
- Claudia Roth Pierpont (1979), staff writer of The New Yorker
- Belva Plain (1939), writer
- Jenelle Porter (1994), art curator and author
- Ariana Reines (2002), poet
- Kristen Roupenian (2003), writer, Cat Person, You Know You Want This
- Cathleen Schine (1975), novelist
- Lynne Sharon Schwartz (1959), writer
- Maria Semple (1986), writer, Where'd You Go, Bernadette
- Courtney Sheinmel (1999), writer of children's books
- Lionel Shriver (1978), novelist and 2005 Orange Prize winner
- Dean Spade (1997), writer, activist, lawyer, assistant professor of law at the Seattle University School of Law
- Eileen Tabios (1982), poet
- Lauren Tarshis (1985), writer, and director at Scholastic Corporation
- Camilla Trinchieri (1963), writer
- Joan Vollmer (1943), Beat poet, partner of William S. Burroughs
- Charmaine Wilkerson (1982), journalist
- Anne Elizabeth Wilson (1923), poet, editor; pet cemetery owner
- Cecily Wong (2010), writer
- Julie Zeilinger (2015), blogger and feminist writer

=== Miscellaneous ===
- Grace Banker (1915), telephone operator who served in the American Expeditionary Forces during World War I and led the Hello Girls, for which she received the Distinguished Service Medal
- Maria Foscarinis (1977), activist, founder of the National Homelessness Law Center
- Madeline Kripke (1965), book collector who held one of the world's largest collections of dictionaries, daughter of Jewish philanthropist and rabbi Myer S. Kripke
- Susan Rosenberg, member of May 19th Communist Organization and charged with a role in the 1983 United States Senate bombing
- Elana Maryles Sztokman (1991), sociologist, writer, and Jewish feminist activist
- Fumiko Yamaguchi (1925), Japanese physician and birth control advocate

=== Fictional alumnae ===
- In the 1988 Woody Allen film Another Woman, Gena Rowland's character is a philosophy professor at Barnard.
- In the 1992 Woody Allen film Husbands and Wives, Juliette Lewis' character, Rain, is a Barnard student.
- In the 2005 Sigrid Nunez novel The Last of Her Kind, heroines Georgette George and Ann Drayton meet in 1968 as freshman roommates at Barnard.
- In the 2007 Noah Baumbach film Margot at the Wedding, Nicole Kidman's character, a novelist, is a Barnard graduate.
- In the television series Mad Men, the character Rachel Menken is a Barnard graduate.
- In the 2015 film Mistress America, the lead character Tracy Fishko is a freshman at Barnard.
- In season 4 of the television series BoJack Horseman, it is mentioned that the title character's mother, Beatrice Horseman, attended Barnard.
- In the 2018 Paul Feig film A Simple Favor, Anna Kendrick's character, Stephanie Smothers, was an English major at Barnard and did her thesis on The Canterbury Tales.

== Notable faculty ==
- Nadia Abu El Haj, anthropologist
- Robert Antoni, Commonwealth Writers Prize–winning author
- Randall Balmer, author and historian of American religion
- Annette Kar Baxter, Adolph S. and Effie Ochs Professor of History
- Dave Bayer, mathematician; actor and math consultant for the film A Beautiful Mind; one of few holders of an Erdős-Bacon number
- Ruth Benedict, anthropologist
- Jenny Boylan, writer
- Frank Brady, leading figure in international chess
- Harriet Brooks, physicist
- Tina Campt, Africana and Women's, Gender, and Sexuality Studies
- Demetrios James Caraley, editor of the Political Science Quarterly; president of the Academy of Political Science
- Elizabeth Castelli, professor of Religion
- John Cheever (1956–1957), Pulitzer Prize–winning novelist and short story writer
- Yvette Christianse, poet, librettist
- Alexander Cooley, political scientist, former director of the Harriman Institute
- Dennis Dalton (1969–2008), political scientist; renowned nonviolence proponent; scholar of Mohandas Karamchand Gandhi
- Pauline Hamilton Dederer (1878–1960), biologist; zoology instructor at Barnard before 1917
- Celia Deutsch, professor, religious sister, academic, educator, writer, and Old Testament scholar
- Rosalyn Deutsche, art historian, author, and art critic
- Marjorie Housepian Dobkin, author
- Patricia Louise Dudley (1929–2004), zoologist
- Mortimer Lamson Earle, classicist
- Theodor Gaster, author; religion scholar; translator
- Harry Gideonse (1901–1985), president of Brooklyn College, and chancellor of the New School for Social Research
- Virginia Gildersleeve
- Mary Gordon, writer
- Saskia Hamilton (1967–2023), poet and editor
- Elizabeth Hardwick, writer; co-founder of The New York Review of Books; wife of Robert Lowell
- Ken Hechler, U.S. congressman from West Virginia
- Anne Higonnet, art historian, Guggenheim Fellow
- Janet Jakobsen, religion and Women's, Gender, and Sexuality Studies
- Rebecca Jordan-Young, Women's, Gender, and Sexuality Studies, author of Brain Storm: The Flaws in the Science of Sex Differences
- Charles Knapp, PhD, philologist and classical scholar
- Dorothy Y. Ko, historian of early China, Guggenheim Fellow
- Elizabeth Kujawinski, oceanographer, Woods Hole senior scientist
- Janna Levin, physicist
- David Macklovitch, musician
- Perry Mehrling, economic historian
- Gabriela Mistral, first Latin American Nobel Prize winner for Literature
- Samuel Alfred Mitchell, astronomer
- Raymond Moley (1923–1933), proponent and later critic of the New Deal
- Frederick Neuhouser, philosopher
- Barbara Novak, art historian
- Sigrid Nunez, novelist
- Elaine Pagels (1970–1982), scholar of early and gnostic Christianity
- Ben Philippe, Haitian-Canadian author and screenwriter
- Alan F. Segal, ancient Judaism and origins of Christianity; author of Life after Death, and Paul the Convert
- William C. Sharpe, cultural historian, Guggenheim Fellow
- Edmund Ware Sinnott, botanist
- Dolph Sweet, actor
- Ashley Tuttle, former principal dancer at ABT; Tony-nominated actress
- Paige West, anthropologist, Guggenheim Fellow
- Elie Wiesel (1997–1999), Nobel Peace Prize–winning writer and activist

== Recipients of the Medal of Distinction ==
The Barnard Medal of Distinction is the college's highest honor.

1977

- Joan Mondale

1978

- Samuel R. Milbank
- Richard Rodgers
- Iphigene Ochs Sulzberger '14

1979

- Adelyn Dohme Breeskin
- Helen Gahagan Douglas '24
- Eleanor Thomas Elliott '48
- William Am Marstellar
- Toni Morrison
- Francis T. P. Plimpton

1980

- Dorothy Height
- Julius S. Held
- Mary Dublin Keyserling '30
- Margaret Mahler
- Alan Pifer
- Henriette H. Swope '25

1981

- Robert L. Hoguet
- Elizabeth Janeway '35
- Beverly Sills

1982

- Carol Bellamy
- Raymond J. Saulnier
- Twyla Tharp '63

1983

- Mario Cuomo
- Vernon Jordan, Jr.
- Mirra Komarovsky '26

1984

- Arthur Altschul
- Annette Kar Baxter '47 (posthumous)
- Joseph G. Brennan
- Anna Hill Johnstone '34

1985

- Marian Wright Edelman
- Sidney Dillon Ripley
- Elizabeth Man Sarcka '17

1986

- A. Bartlett Giamatti
- Frances Lehman Loeb
- Helen M. Ranney '41

1987

- Judith Kaye '58
- Sally Falk Moore '43
- Rev. James Parks Morton
- Ellen Stewart

1988

- Augusta Souza Kappner '66
- Ntozake Shange '70
- Maxine Singer

1989

- Joan Kaplan Davidson
- Eugene Lang
- Bernice Segal (posthumous)
- Lottie L. Taylor-Jones

1990

- Jacqueline Barton '74
- Robert L. Bernstein
- Jean Blackwell Hutson '35
- Julie V. Marsteller '69

1991

- Miriam Goldman Cedarbaum '50
- Tisa Chang '63
- Mamphela Ramphele, delivered the 2002 commencement address

1992

- Ingrith Johnson Deyrup-Olsen '40
- Fred W. Friendly
- Millicent Carey McIntosh
- Frank Stella

1993

- Arthur Ashe (posthumous)
- Elizabeth B. Davis '41
- Helene Lois Kaplan '53
- Bette Bao Lord
- Cyrus Vance

1994

- Walter Cronkite
- Ellen V. Futter '71
- Barbara Stoler Miller '62 (posthumous)
- Arthur Mitchell
- Sheila E. Widnall

1995

- Madeleine Albright
- Rosemary Park Anastos
- Derek Bok
- Sissela Bok

1996

- Rita R. Colwell
- Kitty Carlisle Hart
- Maya Lin
- Dame Anne Warburton

1997

- Sarah Brady
- Merce Cunningham
- Charlayne Hunter-Gault
- Ruth Prawer Jhabvala

1998

- Mary L. Good
- Joan Ganz Cooney
- David Aaron Kessler

1999

- Zoe Caldwell
- Abby Joseph Cohen
- Esther Dyson
- William T. Golden

2000

- Doris Kearns Goodwin, delivered the 2000 commencement address
- Hanna Holborn Gray
- Annie Leibovitz
- Kathie L. Olson

2001

- Morris Dees
- Susan Hendrickson
- Maxine Greene '38
- Bernice Johnson Reagon, delivered the 2001 commencement address
- Barbara Novak '50
- Alice Rivlin
- Harold E. Varmus

2003

- Susan Band Horwitz
- Judith Miller '69, delivered the commencement address
- Martha Nussbaum

2004

- Sylvia Earle
- Louise Glück

2005

- Carla D. Hayden
- Amartya Sen

2006

- Linda Greenhouse
- Audra McDonald
- Francine du Plessix Gray '52

2007

- Joan Didion
- Nicholas D. Kristof
- Mary Patterson McPherson
- Muriel Petioni
- Anna Deavere Smith

2008

- Thelma C. Davidson Adair
- Michael Bloomberg, delivered the 2008 commencement address
- Billie Jean King
- David Remnick
- Judith Shapiro

2009

- Hillary Clinton, delivered the 2009 commencement address
- Kay Murray
- Indra Nooyi
- Irene J. Winter '60

2010

- Thelma Golden
- Olympia Snowe
- Meryl Streep, delivered the 2010 commencement address
- Shirley M. Tilghman

2011

- Sheryl Sandberg, COO of Facebook, delivered the 2011 commencement address
- Sylvia Rhone
- Roberta Guaspari
- Jenny Holzer

2012

- Barack Obama, president of the United States, delivered the 2012 commencement address
- Sally Chapman, Barnard Professor of Chemistry
- Helene D. Gayle '76, president and CEO of CARE, USA
- Evan Wolfson, founder and president of Freedom to Marry

2013

- Leymah Gbowee, recipient of the 2011 Nobel Peace Prize, delivered the 2013 commencement address
- Elizabeth Diller, architect and designer of the High Line
- Lena Dunham, creator, director, writer and star of the HBO series Girls

2014

- Cecile Richards, president of the Planned Parenthood Federation
- Mahzarin Banaji, social psychologist and professor of social ethics at Harvard University
- Ursula Burns, chair and chief executive officer of Xerox
- Patti Smith, musician, poet, and artist

2015

- Samantha Power, academic and journalist
- Simi Linton, expert on disability and the arts
- Nadia Lopez, principal of Mott Hall Bridges Academy
- Diana Nyad, long-distance swimmer and author

2016

- Anne-Marie Slaughter
- Chimamanda Ngozi Adichie
- Simone Campbell
- Shafi Goldwasser

2017

- Joanne Liu
- Johnnetta Cole
- Diane von Furstenberg
- Zainab Salbi

2018

- Abby Wambach
- Katherine Johnson
- Anna Quindlen ’74
- Rhea Suh ’92

2019

- Viola Davis
- Sana Amanat ’04
- Cherríe Moraga
- Shirley Adelson Siegel ’37
- Paola Ramos '09
- Cynthia Nixon '88

2021

- Christiane Amanpour
- Rebecca Nagle
- Okwui Okpokwasili
- Myriam Sarachik '54

2022

- Margot Lee Shetterly
- Allyson Felix
- Stacey Gabriel
- Sarah Ruhl
- Jaune Quick-to-See Smith

2023

- Lena Waithe
- Lynsey Addario
- María Magdalena Campos Pons
- Loretta Ross
