= Gilboy =

Gilboy is a surname. Notable people with the surname include:

- Bertram Gilboy (1894–1974), English footballer
- Elizabeth Waterman Gilboy (1903–1973), American economist
- W. J. Gilboy (1876–?), American schoolteacher and politician
