= Denis Dalton =

Denis Dalton may refer to:

- Denis Dalton (bowls) (1941–2018), Australian lawn bowler
- Denis Dalton (footballer) (born 1942), Australian VFL player

== See also ==
- Dennis Dalton (born 1948), American professor of political science
