= DeLano Award for Computational Biosciences =

- Awarded for: “the most accessible and innovative development or application of computer technology to enhance research in the life sciences at the molecular level”
- Sponsored by: American Society for Biochemistry and Molecular Biology (ASBMB)
- First award: 2011
- Website: www.asbmb.org/awards-grants/delano

The DeLano Award for Computational Biosciences is a prize in the field of computational biology. It is awarded annually for "the most accessible and innovative development or application of computer technology to enhance research in the life sciences at the molecular level".

The prize was established by the American Society for Biochemistry and Molecular Biology (ASBMB) in memory of Warren Lyford DeLano, an American bioinformatician. DeLano developed the PyMOL open source molecular viewer software and was an advocate for the increased adoption of open source practices in the sciences. DeLano died unexpectedly in 2009.

Laureates include the Nobel Prize winner Michael Levitt, who was given the Delano Award in 2013 for his work in computational bioscience, and Helen M. Berman, former Director of the Protein Data Bank, who was given the DeLano Award for her leadership in standardizing protein structural data, leading to such developments as AlphaFold.

== Laureates ==
- 2027 - John Moult
- 2026 - Roland Dunbrack
- 2025 - Rohit Pappu
- 2024 - Eytan Ruppin
- 2023 - no award
- 2022 - Tatyana Sharpee
- 2021 - no award
- 2020 - Yang Zhang
- 2019 - Brian Kuhlman
- 2018 - Chris Sander
- 2017 - Brian K. Shoichet
- 2016 - Todd O. Yeates
- 2015 - Vijay S. Pande
- 2014 - Michael Levitt
- 2013 - Helen M. Berman
- 2012 - Barry Honig
- 2011 - Axel T. Brunger

== See also ==
- List of biology awards
- List of awards in bioinformatics and computational biology
