= Cicely Applebaum Ryshpan =

American economist

Cicely Applebaum
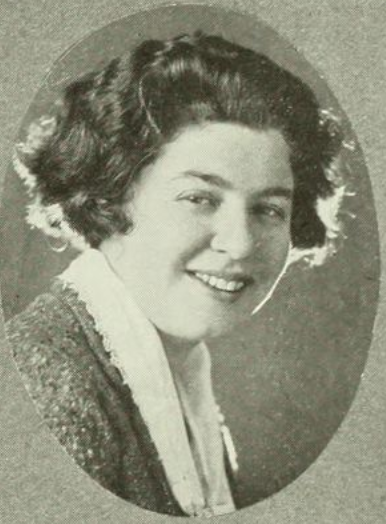
- Photo of her 1924 graduation from Barnard College (New York City)
- Born: Cicely Applebaum; April 9, 1904; New York City (Greenwich Village), United States
- Died: March 16, 2004 (aged 99); Oakland (California), United States
- Occupation: Economist
- Years active: 1922–1970
- Spouse: David Ryshpan (1904–1971)
- Children: Jonathan and Joseph Ryshpan

Cicely Applebaum (after marriage, Cicely A. Ryshpan; 1904–2004) was an American economist with labor unions, the US federal government, various United Nations agencies, and the World Bank. Her professional career spanned nearly 50 years.

== Education ==
Cicely Applebaum was a daughter of Hyman Applebaum and Tinnie Medovnick.

Applebaum's graduated from Barnard College 1924 and Columbia University Graduate School of Journalism in 1925. She graduated with a master's degree in economics from Columbia University in 1932.

== Career ==
Early 1920s, she published articles for the publications of Amalgamated Clothing Worker's Union; she also sold articles on free-lance base to other editors.

As of July 26, 1926, Cicely Applebaum applies for work to Sacco-Vanzette Defense Committee, located in Boston, proposing her services. She wrote: “I graduated from the Columbia School of Journalism only one year ago, but I have done publicity work for a large philanthropic organization in New York, done free-lance writing for New York newspapers, and assisted Helen Black in the publicity work for the Furriers’ Strike.”.

Late 1920s and early 1930s: she worked for the National Bureau for Economic Research, in New York City.

From 1936, she worked for various U.S. federal government agencies in Washington, D.C. As an economist, Cicely was involved in the New Deal programs which consist of a series of programs, public work projects, financial reforms and regulations. The New Deal has been enacted between 1933 and 1939 in the United States by President Franklin D. Roosevelt.

From 1944 until its dissolution in 1946, Cicely worked for UNRRA (the United Nations Relief and Rehabilitation Administration). In 1944, she was assigned as Chief, to the “Studies Coordinating Section”

From 1946 until 1970, she worked as an economist for the International Bank for Reconstruction and Development (the “World Bank”). Cicely has always demonstrated her passion for her work with UNRRA. Although the granting of UNRRA loans was occasionally the subject of opposition from various groups with divergent political interests, Cicely insisted on the application of high professional standards; as economist, she demonstrated research rigor in her papers produced for supporting loan projects, with her diplomacy and her fair judgment.

Cicely was a passionate careerist. Throughout his career and even in retirement, Cicely has shown an interest in politics and societal issues. Cicely retired in 1970 after almost 50 years of intensive career.

== Personal life ==
In 1934, Cicely married David Ryshpan. He was a son of Isaac Ryshpan and Laja Krakowski. David was born on September 14, 1904, in Przedborz, Poland; death in August 1971 at age 66. David Ryshpan graduated from NYU in accounting, and graduate school at Columbia University. He was a statistician for the government in Washington, DC. He served on the S.E.C. during World War II. He worked also as a clerk in a bank. He died on August 5, 1971, in Marin County, California.

Cicely lived in New York City from 1904 to 1935. The couple Ryshpan-Applebaum lived in Washington, DC, from 1935 to 1973.

In the 1930 United States census, she was declared a resident of the Bronx (districts 501–750), in New York City; in 1940 census, at 2901 Eighteenth Street N.W., Washington District of Columbia, USA.

Cicely returned to live in New York City, from 1973 until 1996. Finally, Cicely lived in the San Francisco Bay area in California from 1996 to 2004. In summary, Cicely lived mostly on East Coast of United States, until 1996.

After a long illness (her health declined in the last months of her life), she died in her home in Oakland (California, USA) on March 16, 2004. It would have taken 23 additional days for Cicely Applebaum to reach the venerable age of 100. She died at her Oakland residence on March 16, 2004. Following her death, Cecily's home was filled with a large collection of books dealing with various topics of interest.

== Selected works ==
- Yugoslavia – Preliminary economic manual “International bank for reconstruction and development”, Economic Department of World Bank, 26 pages, prepared by Cicely A. Ryshpan, published on June 3, 1949.
- Power Mining Industry Project – Yugoslavia, former – Serbia and Montenegro, by Cicely A. Ryshpan, 1956, 59 pages, summary of World Bank loans in Yugoslavia.

== See also ==
- List of Barnard College people
