= The Sylvia Center =

US nonprofit organization

- Formation: 2006
- Founder: Liz Neumark
- Location: New York, New York
- Website: www.sylviacenter.org

The Sylvia Center is an American, New York-based 501(c)(3) nonprofit organization that focuses on children's nutrition by teaching children and families about healthy eating habits and cooking.

== History ==
The Sylvia Center was founded in 2006 Liz Neumark, CEO of the catering company Great Performances and advocate for sustainable agriculture. Named after Neumark's daughter, Sylvia, The Sylvia Center began as a pilot culinary program for children in New York City Housing Authority residents.

The organization's programs include cooking classes, field trips to Katchkie Farm (an organic farm and a partner of The Sylvia Center), and gardening classes for children and families. The programs are offered in New York City through NYCHA community centers as well as Upstate New York (Kinderhook and Columbia County).
