= Dorota =

Dorota is a Polish, Czech and Slovak female given name, cognate with Dorothy.

Notable people with the name include:

- Dorota Andraka (born 1961), Polish-American educator
- Dorota Dabrowska, Polish statistician
- Dorota Gawron (born 1983), represented Poland in the Miss Universe pageant
- Dorota Gruca (born 1970), Polish marathon runner
- Dorota Barbara Jabłonowska (1760–1844), Polish noblewoman
- Dorota Jakuta (born 1958), Polish politician
- Dorota Jędrusińska (born 1982), Polish track and field sprint athlete
- Dorota Kędzierzawska (born 1957), Polish director of feature and documentary films
- Dorota Kwaśna (born 1972), Polish cross country skier
- Dorota Masłowska (born 1983), Polish writer and journalist
- Dorota Nieznalska (born 1973), Polish artist
- Dorota Pospíšilová (born 1930), Slovak viticulturist
- Dorota Rabczewska (born 1984), Polish singer
- Dorota Sitańska (born 1767), Polish ballerina
- Dorota Siudek (born 1975), Polish retired pairs skater who is now a coach
- Dorota Świeniewicz (born 1972), Polish volleyball player
- Dorota Tarnowska (1513–1540), Polish noblewoman
- Dorota Terakowska (1938–2004), Polish novelist and journalist
- Dorota Tlałka-Mogore (1963–2025), Polish-French alpine skier
- Dora Bianka (c. 1895–1979), born as Dorota Kucembianka, Polish-born French painter, illustrator

== See also ==
- Dorothy (given name)
- Dorothea (disambiguation)
