= Irene J. Winter =

American art historian (born 1940)

- Born: 1940 (age 85–86); New York City, New York, U.S.

Academic background
- Education: Barnard College; Columbia University

Academic work
- Discipline: History
- Sub-discipline: Art
- Institutions: Harvard University

Irene J. Winter (born 1940 in New York City) is an American art historian who is an influential and pioneering scholar of ancient Near Eastern art.

== Life ==
BA Barnard College, Anthropology, 1960; MA University of Chicago, Near Eastern Studies, 1967; PhD Columbia University, Art History and Archaeology. She has taught at Queens College, CUNY, 1971-1976, The University of Pennsylvania, 1976-1988, and Harvard University since 1988, chairing the department of Fine Arts from 1993-1996, and served on the Faculty Council, 2006-2009; retired June 2009. Slade Professor, University of Cambridge, 1997. She was elected a member of the American Academy of Arts and Sciences in 1999 and the American Philosophical Society in 2016.

== Awards ==
- 2009 The Barnard College Medal of Distinction
- 2005 A. W. Mellon Lectures in the Fine Arts
- 2003-2004 Radcliffe Institute for Advanced Study fellows
- 1983 MacArthur Fellows Program

== Works ==
- On Art in the Ancient Near East, 2 Vols. Brill Academic Publishers, 2010, ISBN 978-90-04-17500-6
