= Tatyana Sharpee =

American computational neuroscientist

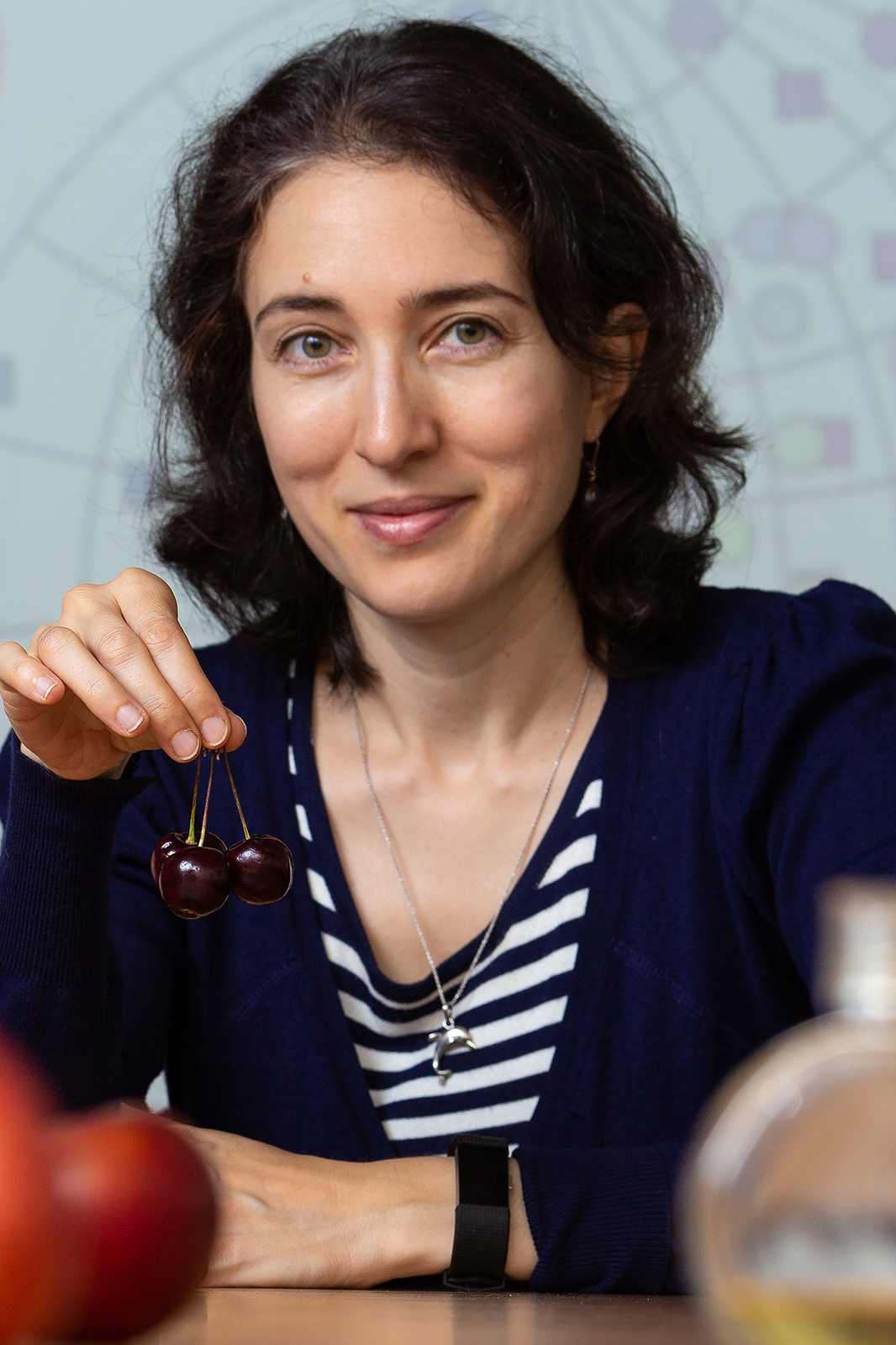
- Education: Taras Shevchenko National University of Kyiv; Michigan State University
- Scientific career
- Fields: Neuroscience
- Workplaces: Salk Institute for Biological Studies

Tatyana Sharpee is an American neuroscientist. She is a Professor at the Salk Institute for Biological Studies, where she spearheads a research group at the Computational Neurobiology Laboratory, as the Edwin Hunter Chair in Neurobiology. She is also an Adjunct Professor at the Department of Physics at University of California, San Diego. She was elected a fellow of American Physical Society in 2019.

== Early life and education ==
Sharpee was interested in science from childhood, and was encouraged by her grandfather. She obtained her BS from Taras Shevchenko National University of Kyiv in Ukraine, and moved on to Michigan State University for her PhD in theoretical physics. Following her PhD, she was a Sloan-Swartz post-doctoral fellow at the University of California, San Francisco. In 2015, she received a National Science Foundation grant to study feature selectivity and invariance in deep neural architectures. Her work has been focused on probing how our brains represent complex transformations of the same object to recognize it. Sharpee uses state-of-the-art deep learning algorithms to understand where the algorithms are failing at complex object transformations. The NSF grant also enabled her lab to study how the auditory system of the brain works based on large scale simulations of neural networks. This latter work not only has potential to improve the current hearing aid technology, but also could reveal therapeutic paths to treat a number of attention deficit and psychiatric disorders which depend on the corresponding system.

== Career and research ==
Following graduate school, Sharpee worked at the University of California, San Francisco from 2001 to 2007 as a Sloan-Swartz fellow, where the bulk of her work revolved around computational neuroscience. She then joined UCSD and the Salk Institute as faculty and has been working there since, supervising a number of graduate students in physics, neuroscience and quantitative biology. In 2018, Sharpee was elected as a Fellow of the American Physical Society for her work in Physics.

== Selected publications ==
- Jeanne, J.M., Sharpee, T.O., Gentner, T.Q. Associative learning enhances population coding by inverting interneuronal correlation patterns. (2013) Neuron. 78(2):352-63. DOI: 10.1016/j.neuron.2013.02.023
- Atencio, C.A., Sharpee, T.O., Schreiner, C.E. Cooperative nonlinearities in auditory cortical neurons. (2008) Neuron. 58(6):956-66. DOI: 10.1016/j.neuron.2008.04.026
- Clifford, C.W.G., Webster, M.A., Stanley, G.B., et al. Visual adaptation: Neural, psychological and computational aspects. Vision Research. 2007; 47(25): 3125-3131, https://doi.org/10.1016/j.visres.2007.08.023
- Sharpee, T.O., Sugihara, H., Kurgansky, A.V., Rebrik, S.P., Stryker, M.P., Miller, K.D. Adaptive filtering enhances information transmission in visual cortex. (2006) Nature. 439(7079):936-42. DOI: 10.1038/nature04519
- Sharpee, T., Rust, N.C., Bialek, W. Analyzing neural responses to natural signals: maximally informative dimensions. (2004) Neural Computation. 16(2):223-50. DOI: 10.1162/089976604322742010

== Awards and honors ==
- DeLano Award for Computational Biosciences (2022)
- Fellow of the American Physical Society (2018)
- McKnight Scholar (2009)
- Searle Scholar (2008)
- Sloan Research Fellowship (2008)
