= Brian Kuhlman =

Brian A. Kuhlman is an American professor of biochemistry and biophysics at the UNC School of Medicine of University of North Carolina at Chapel Hill and a Sloan Research Fellow.

== Early life ==
Kuhlman obtained Bachelor of Arts degree in chemical physics from Rice University in 1992. From 1993 to 1998 he studied under guidance of Daniel Raleigh to earn his Ph.D. in chemistry from Stony Brook University and from 1999 to 2002 he studied under guidance from David Baker to obtain Damon Runyon Postdoctoral Fellowship at the University of Washington.

== Career ==
In 2003, Kuhlman designed the first full-domain artificial protein, Top7, with Gautam Dantas and other researchers, in David Baker's laboratory. In his independent research laboratory, Kuhlman continued pioneering research in protein design, including breakthroughs in design of protein conformational switches, protein interface design, design of protein loops, stitching together components of natural proteins, designed fusions for bispecific antibodies, and progress toward vaccines.

== Awards ==
- DeLano Award for Computational Biosciences
- Feynman Prize in Nanotechnology
- Beckman Young Investigator
