= Cecily Wong =

Writer

Cecily Wong is a writer best known for her novel Diamond Head, published by HarperCollins in 2015. Her work has also appeared in The Wall Street Journal, the LA Review of Books, Self Magazine, and Bustle.

Wong is the co-author of Gastro Obscura: An Explorer’s Guide to Food and a writer at Atlas Obscura. Her second novel, Kaleidoscope, was published in 2022.

== Personal life ==
Wong was born in Hawaii and raised in Oregon. She graduated from Barnard College in 2010. She is married and currently lives in Portland, Oregon.
