= Shirley Adelson Siegel =

American lawyer (1918–2020)

Shirley Adelson Siegel (July 3, 1918 – June 22, 2020) was an American lawyer whose work as a housing activist and advocate spanned over seven decades. Siegel was the first head of New York State’s Civil Rights Bureau and served as New York State’s solicitor general. She turned 100 in July 2018.

== Early life ==
Siegel was born Shirley Adelson on July 3, 1918, in The Bronx, New York City, to Jewish immigrant parents born in the part of Czarist Russia that is now known as Lithuania. Her father’s name in Europe had been Abramowicz, but upon immigrating he changed it to Adelson.

When Siegel was in her last year of high school, her family faced eviction from their home in Inwood.

== Education ==
Siegel graduated as valedictorian of her high school class in 1933 at the age of fourteen.

Siegel attended Barnard College in the 1930s, at a time when Barnard had a quota for Jewish students. As an undergraduate at Barnard in the 1930s, Siegel became committed to the cause of affordable housing. Her interest in housing developed after she served as an intern with the New York Legislative Service in 1936 and was assigned to become knowledgeable about the field of housing. During her internship, Siegel encountered Charles Abrams and Langdon Post of the New York City Housing Authority. Siegel studied government at Barnard and graduated Phi Beta Kappa. After graduating from Barnard in 1937, Siegel was voted the recipient of a student-funded fellowship available to one graduating Barnard student to study abroad. Siegel attended the London School of Economics, where she continued to develop her studies of housing. Siegel entered Yale Law School in 1938 as the only woman in her class; she graduated 4th in the class of 125 students.

== Career ==
Upon graduation, Siegel interviewed with over forty firms before eventually landing a job at Proskauer, where she was the first woman ever at the firm. In 1959, New York Attorney General Louis Lefkowitz hired Siegel to run the newly founded Civil Rights Bureau of the New York State Law Department. In that office, Siegel challenged the discriminatory hiring practices of the citywide building trade unions. Siegel served as general counsel of the New York Housing and Development Administration under New York Mayor John V. Lindsay. As an active member of the New York City Bar, Siegel ultimately became chair of the City Bar Committee on Housing and Urban Development. In 1979, Siegel was appointed New York State’s Solicitor General by Attorney General Robert Abrams. She served in that office until 1982. She died in Manhattan following a stroke on June 22, 2020 at the age of 101.

== Personal ==
She married Elwood (Woody) Siegel, a filmmaker in 1946. The couple had two children, daughter Ann and son Eric. Elwood died in 1994. Siegel married an old boyfriend from college, Prof. Henry Fagin, in 1997. He died in 2009.

== Miscellaneous ==
As a volunteer with the American Civil Liberties Union in the early 1940s, Siegel volunteered on the Supreme Court case challenging Japanese internment camps. Siegel also authored The Law of Open Space. Siegel volunteered with the City Bar Justice Center in their foreclosure project.
