= Liz Neumark =

American chef and entrepreneur (born 1956)

- Born: 1956 (age 69–70); New York City, U.S.
- Education: Barnard College
- Occupations: Chef, entrepreneur

Liz Neumark (born in New York City) is an American entrepreneur, chef, and advocate.

Neumark is the founder and CEO of New York catering company Great Performances, and the founder of nonprofit organization The Sylvia Center.

As of 2023, she was a member of the New York State Food Policy Council, and sits on the boards of GrowNYC, The Fund for Public Housing, The Sylvia Center, and Open House NY. She is also a vice president of the board of directors for the Bronx Chamber of Commerce.

== Life and career ==
Neumark graduated from Barnard College in 1977 with a bachelor's degree in urban studies.

=== Great Performances ===
In 1979, she founded Great Performances, a waitress-staffing agency for women in the arts industry. The venture transformed over the years into a catering company that specializes in serving cultural institutions throughout New York City. In 1982, the company received a $25,000 loan to open their first kitchen, which was located in Soho. In 2019, Great Performances moved their headquarters from Hudson Square, Manhattan to Mott Haven, Bronx.

Great Performances is the exclusive caterer for artistic institutions including Jazz at Lincoln Center, Brooklyn Academy of Music, Apollo Theater, Brooklyn Museum, Caramoor Center for Music and the Arts and Wave Hill. In keeping with its appreciation of the arts, Great Performances created the Scholarship Awards Program which supports aspiring artists among its staff with $5,000 awards to help them complete a project that will further their artistic pursuits.

In 2006, Neumark established Katchkie Farm, an organic farm on 35 acres (140,000 m^{2}) of land near Kinderhook in Columbia County. Situated on the farm is The Sylvia Center, the organization founded by Neumark to promote healthy cooking and nutrition education for kids via experiential learning.

In 2007, Great Performances entered a 25-year contract to cater events at the Plaza Hotel ballroom as part of a joint venture with Delaware North.

=== Writing ===
Neumark has previously blogged on the topic of food politics for HuffPost.

== Recognition ==
She is a recipient of the 2008 Food Arts Silver Spoon Award, and was named one of the 100 Most Influential Women in NYC Business in 2007 by Crain's New York. In 2012, she was presented with the Barnard's Woman of Achievement Award. In 2023, the New York City Tourism Foundation honoured Neumark as a leader in the city's hospitality and cultural industries.
