= Dora Bianka =

Polish painter, illustrator (c. 1895–1979)

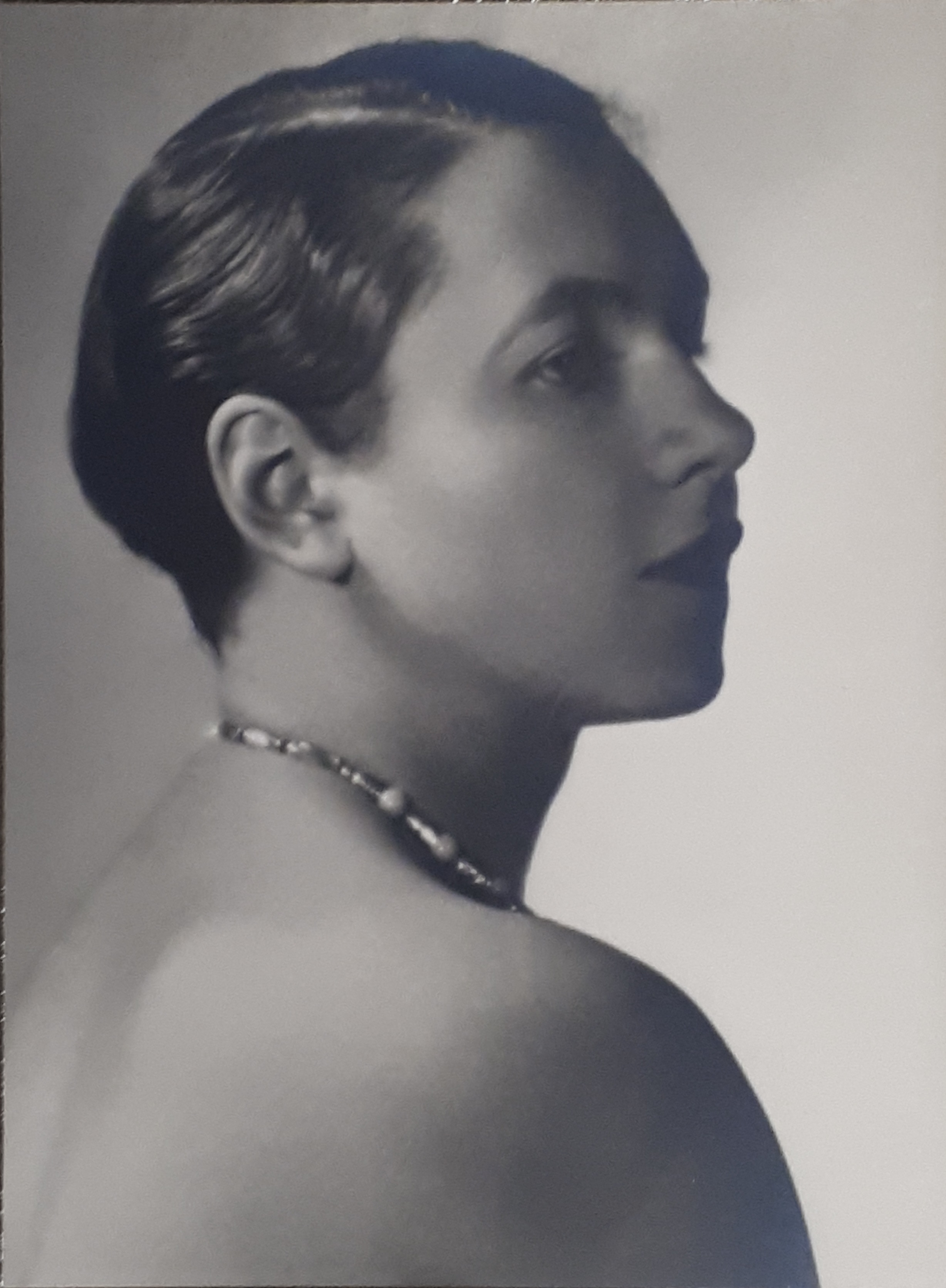
- Born: Dorota Kucembianka; November 6, 1895, or 1896; Warsaw, Poland
- Died: September 8, 1979; Le Chesnay, Île-de-France, France
- Occupation(s): Painter, illustrator

Dora Bianka (née Dorota Kucembianka; November 6, 1895, or 1896 – September 8, 1979) was a Polish painter and illustrator. She was known for her still life paintings; and landscape painting, particularly of seascapes of the South of France, and views of Paris. She had lived in Paris for many years, before moving to Aix-en-Provence.

== Early life and education ==
Dora Bianka was born as Dorota Kucembianka, on November 6, 1895, or 1896, in Warsaw, Poland. Her father was a magistrate, and their family was wealthy. She attended a school for young girls founded by countess Cecylia Plater-Zyberk in Warsaw.

Bianka studied painting under Fernand Humbert and Louis Biloul at the École des Beaux-Arts in Paris.

== Career ==
Bianka was friends with artists Joan Miró and Jean Cocteau, and was part of the School of Paris circle. In 1923, she first exhibited at the Salon d'Automne. In 1924, she exhibited at the salon and was presented by Joan Miró, and she continued to exhibit her work at the Salon d'Automne for many years after. In addition she exhibited in 1924 and 1925, at Société des Artistes Indépendants; and in 1926 at Salon des Tuileries.

During World War II, she settled in Aix-en-Provence.

== Death and legacy ==
Bianka died on September 8, 1979, in Le Chesnay, France.

The Foundation Rose Taupin–Dora Bianka, is a French foundation named after her, which awards an annual scholarship to young painter to attend the Paris École des Beaux-Arts.

Bianka's artwork was mostly forgotten, but she has been experienced a second wave of attention. In 2023, the Polish Library in Paris hosted a solo exhibition. Her character appeared in the television film Miró (2023), directed by Oriol Ferrer and produced by Televisió de Catalunya (TV3).
