= Annette Kar Baxter =

American women's history expert, professor, and author

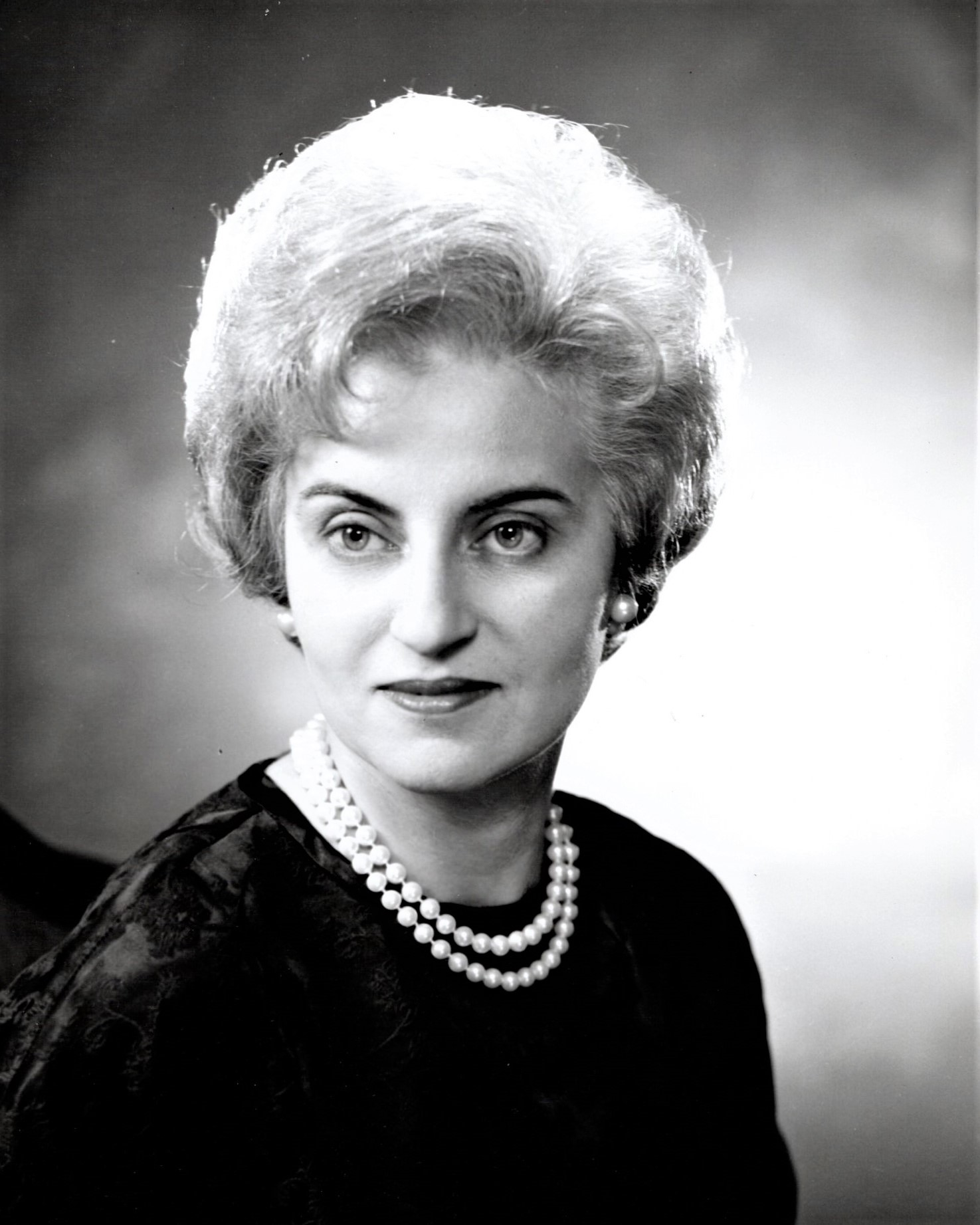
- Annette K. Baxter, ca. 1970
- Born: Annette Kar; November 12, 1926; New York, New York
- Died: September 18, 1983 (aged 56); Fire Island, New York
- Spouse: James E. Baxter (m. 1955)
- Children: 2

Academic background
- Education: New York University; Barnard College (AB); Smith College (AM); Radcliffe College (AM); Brown University (PhD)

Academic work
- Discipline: Women's studies

Annette Kar Baxter (née Kar; November 12, 1926 – September 18, 1983) was an historian of American history and an American women's history expert, professor, and author. She spent much of her career at Barnard College, where, beginning in 1966, she created and taught the first women's history courses to undergraduate students. She was a pioneer in helping to create the field of Women's Studies.

== Early life and education ==
Annette Kar was born on November 12, 1926, in Manhattan. She attended New York University for one year before transferring to Barnard College. In 1947 she received an A.B. from Barnard, summa cum laude and as a member of Phi Beta Kappa, and began working full-time as an editorial assistant at Random House, a position that she began on a part-time basis her senior year. In the fall, she returned to school, earning an A.M. from Smith College in 1948 and another A.M. from Radcliffe College in 1949.

== Career ==
She then began her life-long career at Barnard, working at first as a lecturer and then as an associate in the history department. She served as the executive secretary for the University Seminar on American Civilization at Columbia from 1953 to 1959, and served as the secretary for the American Studies Bibliography Project of the American Studies Association from 1953 to 1956.

She received her Ph.D. from Brown in 1958 with Henry Miller: Expatriate (University of Pittsburgh Press, 1961), one of the earliest scholarly treatments on the writer Henry Miller. She was promoted to the status of lecturer in the History Department at Barnard. Two years later she became an associate in History. In 1966 she was appointed as an assistant professor of history and was quickly promoted to associate professor status. She reached full professorship in 1971, and in 1975 had the honor of being one of a handful of women to be awarded an endowed chair, named for Adolph and Iphigene ("Effie") Ochs Sulzberger.

Baxter was a pioneer in the field of women's studies, teaching one of the earliest women's history classes to undergraduates in 1966. Her course served as a model for many future classes at other institutions. She remained involved in a wide variety of activities at Barnard throughout her career, including serving as an advisor to the class of 1962, membership on the Board of Trustees, regularly participating in the Seven College Conference, advising the Thursday Noon Meetings, and playing a vital role in the creation and expansion of the Women's Center at Barnard College, now the Barnard Center for Research on Women. She was acting chair of the American Studies Program in 1960-61 and 1963–64, and was made permanent chair of the department in 1967; she also served as chair of the history department from 1974 to 1983. Baxter was also a founding member of the Barnard College Archive.

In addition to her career at Barnard, Baxter involved herself in many other organizations. She served on the board of trustees for Conference in Theology for College and University Faculty, Kirkland College (Clinton, New York) and Middlesex School (Concord, Massachusetts). She was a consultant for the National Endowment for the Humanities, the Ford Foundation, National Council of Women, and Mr. Rogers' Neighborhood. She served on committees for the American Association of University Women, American Historical Association, Organization of American Historians, American Studies Association, and many others. She participated in panels and gave speeches on the value of women's history and women's education. She has been called "one of the nation's foremost authorities on the history of women."

Throughout her career, Baxter remained dedicated to the cause of women's education, women's studies, and women's rights. As a member of its Board of Trustees, Baxter fought to keep Barnard independent from Columbia, highlighting what might be lost if the women's college merged with the Ivy league school.

Baxter published numerous book reviews and articles, and edited several series on women's autobiographies and women's studies. She often contributed articles to journals and popular magazines, including Nineteenth-Century Fiction and Harpers, among others. Baxter had four books in progress when she died in 1983.

== Personal life ==
In 1955, Baxter married psychiatrist James E. Baxter. Their first child, Justin McDonald, was born in 1959, and their daughter, Adrienne Marshall, was born in 1962.

== Death ==
Annette Baxter died in a fire at her and her husband's summer home on Fire Island on September 18, 1983. She was 56 years old. The fire also claimed her husband, James, and a house guest, Oscar Benedetti of Caracas, Venezuela. The couple's son, Justin, who was also at the house at the time, survived.

== Legacy ==
In 1984, Barnard established the Annette Kar Baxter '47 Memorial Fund Prize, given to a member of the college's junior class who has distinguished themselves in the study of women's experience.The American Studies Association (ASA) created a prize in her name, the Annette K. Baxter Travel Grant, to provide partial travel reimbursement to students presenting papers at the annual ASA conference.

- Henry Miller, Expatriate (1961) Pittsburgh: University of Pittsburgh Press ISBN 978-0-8229-7547-2.
- The Universal Self-Instructor and Manual of General Reference (1970) New York: Winter House [with Albert Ellery Berg] ISBN 9780878060078, 0878060073
- To Be a Woman in America: 1850 – 1930 (1978) New York: Times Books [with Constance Jacobs] ISBN 9780812907643, 0812907647
- Inwood House: One Hundred and Fifty Years of Service to Women (1980) New York: Inwood House [with Barbara Welter]
- Women's History (1984) New York: Markus Wiener
- Good History Never Ceases to Spring: The Writings of Annette K. Baxter, edited by Adrienne Baxter Bell (privately published, 2026)
