= Julie Zeilinger =

American editor and feminist writer (born 1993)

- Education: Barnard College
- Occupations: Author and writer
- Known for: Author of A Little F'd Up, Founder of The FBomb
- Website: www.juliezeilinger.com

Julie Zeilinger is an American author and writer. Her books include A Little F'd Up: Why Feminism is Not a Dirty Word (2012) and she founded the feminist blog The FBomb in 2009, which partnered with the Women's Media Center in 2014 to become the online platform WMC FBomb.

== Early life and education ==
Zeilinger was raised in Pepper Pike, Ohio. At age 16, while she was attending high school at Hawken School in Ohio, she started a blog in spring 2009 titled The FBomb (TheFBomb.org), with the "F" denoting "feminist", which was described as a "grungy, angry, inspiring site" in 2009 by John Crace in The Guardian and "sharp, funny, insightful" by Lynn Harris at Salon. She then obtained a summer internship at the National Council for Research on Women and continued blogging from New York.

Zeilinger has described the book Full Frontal Feminism by Jessica Valenti as an influence on the development of her feminism while she was a freshman during high school, and as what led her to the feminist blog Feministing and other feminist blogs. In 2009, she told The Guardian that she began blogging because "the mainstream feminist blogs I read weren't representing the teenage perspective on issues that directly affect us." At age 15, she conducted her first interview with Gloria Steinem.

She graduated from Barnard College in 2015.

== Career ==
Her first book, A Little F'd Up: Why Feminism Is Not a Dirty Word, was published in April 2012 and released by Seal Press. A review in Publishers Weekly said the book's "ultimate goal is to prove that despite having made great strides in terms of economic, social, and political equality, the feminist cause is still entirely relevant to women and men" and described the book as "ultimately an empowering and timely treatise." Elizabeth Millard wrote in a review for Foreword Reviews that "Zeilinger's wry, conversational style works exceedingly well at making her opinions and research accessible to a wide audience, particularly young adults." A review by Cynthia Harrison in Library Journal describes the book as "talky and thinly resourced (with the occasional error)", while also noting "Zeilinger's goal is to entice her readers to stick with her as she demonstrates her understanding of their plight." In an evaluation of A Little F'd Up for the journal Feminist Teacher, Katie Hogan reviews general criticism of the book and notes Zeilinger wrote the text while she was in high school, as well as the intended audience, and compares her writing to bell hooks, who encouraged people to "come closer to feminism." It was included in the 2013 Amelia Bloomer List, which highlights feminist literature for young readers.

Her next book, College 101: A Girl's Guide to Freshman Year was first published in 2014, and a second edition was published in 2017. A review of the 2014 edition in Feministing by Ava Kofman described it as "the book I wish I read four years ago when I started college" and states "Zeilinger’s additive model of difference (one is first born a woman, and then some) misses the opportunity to speak to the powerful intersectional experiences of incoming freshmen." A third edition was set for release in 2024.

In 2014, Women's Media Center and TheFBomb began a partnership to create content in an online platform that became known as WMC FBomb, where Zeilinger has continued as the editor. In 2017, Zeilinger was also working as an editor at MTV News. In 2021 and 2022, she was a senior content manager for Girls Who Code.

Her writing has appeared in Huffington Post, Feminist.com, Skirt Magazine, The Frisky, and Feministing.

== Books ==
- (2012). A Little F'd Up: Why Feminism is Not a Dirty Word. Seal Press. ISBN 978-1-58005-371-6.
- (2014). College 101: A Girl’s Guide to Freshman Year. Sourcebooks. ISBN 9781618211774.

== Honors and awards ==
- Most Interesting People 2011, Cleveland Magazine
- Forbes 30 Under 30, 2016
- Newsweek's "150 Women Who Shake the World", 2012
- The Jezebel 25, 2012
- More Magazine's "New Feminists You Should Know, 2011
- The Times of London's "40 bloggers who really count", 2012
- Woman's Day magazine's "8 Influential Bloggers Under 21", 2010
