= Lila Wallis =

American physician (1921–2022)

Lila Amdurska Wallis
- Born: June 1, 1921; Grodno, Poland (now Belarus)
- Died: January 3, 2022 (aged 100)
- Education: University of Stefan Batory; Barnard College(BA); Columbia University College of Physicians and Surgeons (MD)
- Medical career
- Profession: Physician
- Field: Internal medicine
- Sub-specialties: Hematology, Endocrinology, Metabolism

Lila Amdurska Wallis (June 1, 1921 – January 3, 2022) was a Polish-born American physician who was board-certified in internal medicine, hematology, and endocrinology/metabolism; the only doctor in the United States to be board-certified in all three specialties. Wallis developed a new methodology to safer gynecological examinations for patients that became the nationally accepted model throughout medical schools in the United States. Additionally, she founded and became the first president of the National Council on Women's Health, and created the Office of Women in Medicine at the New York Hospital-Cornell Medical Center in 1982.

== Education and training ==
Wallis was born in Grodno, Poland, in 1921 and initially began her studies at the University of Stefan Batory in Wilno, Poland. Her education in Poland was cut short following the German invasion during WWII. At 18 years old, she worked alongside the Polish as a nurse in a field hospital in the fight against the Nazis. Along with her interest in science fueled by role model Maria Sklodowska-Curie, the experience of providing underground medical aide to rural populations in Poland during the war solidified her desire to pursue medicine.

After coming to the United States, Wallis graduated from Barnard College with a B.A. in chemistry in 1947. She then earned her M.D. at the Columbia University College of Physicians and Surgeons in 1951. Her postgraduate residency training in internal medicine was done at The New York Hospital-Cornell Medical Center, where she specialized in hematology and endocrinology/metabolism. Following the completion of her residency in 1956, she established her own internal medicine practice in New York where she practiced for 40 years.

== Accomplishments ==
Wallis was commonly known as "the godmother of women's health". In 1979, Wallis along with two women from the Boston Women's Health Book Collective developed a new method of gynecological examinations that were less painful for patients. This method was implemented through the Teaching Associates Program at The New York Hospital-Cornell Medical Center and became the nationally accepted model at medical schools throughout the United States. Wallis additionally founded the Cornell Office of Women in Medicine to support the participation of women in medicine and science. In honor of her achievements, Cornell University Medical College established The Lila Wallis Visiting Professorship in Women's Health in 1987.

Beyond her involvement through Cornell, Wallis was the founding president of the National Council on Women's Health that aims to empower women to make informed decisions about their health by equipping them with necessary knowledge about their bodies. Wallis was also a president of the American Medical Women's Association (AMWA) from 1988 to 1989 and became the first director of AMWA regional conferences during her service. In 1990, a year after her resignation as president, she was the recipient of the highest award granted by AMWA, the Elizabeth Blackwell Medal. The American Medical Women's Association continued to honor Wallis by establishing the Lila A. Wallis Women's Health Award in 1998 dedicated to those whose achievements have influenced women's health.

Wallis was also a recipient of the Georgranna Seegar Jones Lifetime Achievement Award presented by the Society for Advancement in Women's Health Research, the Warner-Lambert Company, and the National Health Council. She later went on to receive the Woman of the Century Award in Women's Health awarded by the Women's Medical Association of New York City. Two years later in 1996, Wallis was promoted to Mastership status within the American College of Physicians (ACP), and thereafter received the Laureate Award from the ACP. Wallis was also the recipient of the Dr. Virginia Kneeland Frantz Distinguished Woman in Medicine Award from Columbia University College of Physicians and Surgeons.

== Publications ==
Wallis wrote multiple books on women's health issues, endocrinology, and hematology; she was also the author of over 70 publications. She was especially recognized for having published the Textbook of Women's Health in 1998 for medical professionals as well as The Whole Woman: Take Charge of Your Health in Every Phase of Your Life in 1999 with co-author Marian Betancourt for non-professionals. Wallis was a member of editorial boards for the Journal of the American Medical Women’s Association, Journal of Women’s Health, Rodale Books on Women's Health, and the National Academy on Women's Health Medical Education.

== Personal life ==
Wallis's mother was also a medical student, but was unable to finish medical school due to her marriage to Wallis's father that discouraged nontraditional female roles. Though her mother's career was cut short, Wallis was always encouraged to pursue her passion for science and medicine. Her mother died in her early 50s of endometrial cancer after being placed on estrogen replacement therapy. This unopposed estrogen therapy was not paired with progesterone and is known to be associated with increasing the risk of endometrial cancer. Wallis associates her mother's death to the mistake of physicians that were inadequately informed regarding issues of women's health, which further fueled her pursuit of women's health issues.

Wallis was married to Dr. Benedict Wallis and the couple had two sons, both of which became physicians. She was also a grandmother. Wallis died on January 3, 2022, at the age of 100.

== Awards ==
- Elizabeth Blackwell Medal – 1990 (AMWA)
- Georgeanna Seegar Jones Lifetime Achievement Award – (Society for Advancement of Women's Health Research, Warner-Lambert Company, National Health Council)
- Woman of the Century Award in Women's Health – 1994 (Women's Medical Association of New York City)
- American College of Physician's Laureate Award – 1997
- Dr. Virginia Kneeland Frantz Distinguished Woman in Medicine Award – 2002
