= William C. Sharpe =

- Awards: Guggenheim Fellowship (1993)

Academic background
- Education: Columbia University (BA, PhD); University of Oxford (MA)

Academic work
- Discipline: Literature, Cultural history
- Institutions: Barnard College

William Chapman Sharpe is an American literary scholar. He is a professor of English at Barnard College, Columbia University.

== Biography ==
Sharpe received his B.A. and Ph.D. from Columbia University and M.A. from the University of Oxford. He joined the faculty of Barnard College in 1983, and his scholarship focuses on the art, culture, and literature of the modern cities, especially New York City. He has written about subjects such as shadows or nighttime environments of cities as depicted in literature and arts as well as a cultural history on walking.

Sharpe received a Guggenheim Fellowship in 1993.

== Works ==
Author

- Unreal Cities: Urban Figuration in Wordsworth, Baudelaire, Whitman, Eliot, and Williams (Johns Hopkins University Press, 1990)
- New York Nocturne: The City After Dark in Art, Literature, and Photography (Princeton University Press, 2008) ISBN 0691133247
- Grasping Shadows: The Dark Side of Literature, Painting, Photography, and Film (Oxford University Press, 2017) ISBN 0190675276
- The Art of Walking: A History in 100 Images (Yale University Press, 2023) ISBN 0300266847

Editor

- The Longman Anthology of British Literature, General Editor David Damrosch, "The Victorian Age", ed. William C. Sharpe and Heather Henderson (Longman, 1999) ISBN 0205655262

== Awards and honors ==
New York Nocturne won the 2009 Modernist Studies Association Book Prize.
