= Rhea Suh =

American government official (born 1970)

- Born: 1970 (age 55–56); Boulder, Colorado, U.S.
- Education: Barnard College (BA); Harvard University (Master of Education)
- Political party: Democratic

Rhea Suh is a former government official who served as Assistant Secretary for Policy, Management and Budget of the United States Department of the Interior from 2009 to 2014 and president of the Natural Resources Defense Council from 2015 to 2019.

== Early life and education ==
Suh was born and raised in Boulder, Colorado by Korean immigrants who left the country after the Korean War. Suh's father, Chung Ha Suh, worked as automotive engineering specialist at the University of Colorado at Boulder, and her mother, Young Ja Suh, was a homemaker. She also has two sisters, Betty and Maggie.

She graduated from Barnard College in 1992. While a student at Barnard, Suh taught earth science at Stuyvesant High School. She was a Fulbright scholar to South Korea, where she studied environmental movements. After returning to the United States, Suh worked as a legislative assistant for Ben Nighthorse Campbell. She then attended Harvard University, and her graduate school project focused on helping the U.S. National Park Service through establishing a formal education program at schools around the country.

== Career ==
Suh worked at the David and Lucile Packard Foundation, where she created and managed a program dedicated to environmental conservation and clean energy and coordinated energy conservation efforts of various nonprofits across the Colorado River Basin.

She then worked at the William and Flora Hewlett Foundation, where she led the effort to create the Great Bear Rainforest and spearheaded conservation and clean energy initiatives.

On March 25, 2009, she was nominated by President Barack Obama for the position of Assistant Secretary for Policy Management and Budget at the United States Department of the Interior. The senate confirmed her nomination.

In 2013, President Obama nominated Suh to serve as Assistant Secretary for Fish and Wildlife and Parks but her nomination faced opposition from the Republicans. She was also criticized by The Wall Street Journal for her stance against fossil fuels. Although her nomination was approved by the United States Senate Committee on Energy and Natural Resources, her nomination was held up in the United States Senate and was withdrawn.

After she resigned from her post in 2014, Suh became the third president of the Natural Resources Defense Council (NRDC), replacing Frances Beinecke. She assumed her post in January 2015. Under her leadership, the NRDC helped steer high-level talks leading up to the Paris Agreement, championed a settlement for the residents of Flint, Michigan, and was a partner for the Women's March on Washington.

Suh stepped down from her position as president on June 30, 2019. She is a current fellow of the Walton Family Foundation.

== Personal life ==
Suh is married to Michael Carroll and has one daughter, Yeumi. She and her family live in Washington, D.C.
