= Camilla Trinchieri =

American writer

- Born: 1942 (age 83–84); Prague, Protectorate of Bohemia and Moravia
- Other names: Trella Crespi; Camilla T. Crespi
- Education: Barnard College; Columbia University, MFA
- Occupation: Writer
- Awards: Italian American Association Book Award 2017
- Website: http://www.camillatrinchieri.com/

Camilla Trinchieri (born 1942) is an Italian-American mystery writer and novelist. She has published under three names: Camilla Trinchieri, Trella Crespi, and Camilla T. Crespi.

== Biography ==
Daughter of an Italian diplomat and an American expatriate from Panama, she worked in the Italian film industry before moving to New York City in 1980. She became a U.S. citizen in 1997.

Trinchieri, a graduate of Barnard College and Columbia University, published her first novel, The Trouble with a Small Raise, in 1991. In 2017, she won the Italian American Studies Association Book Award for Seeking Alice, published in 2016.

== Bibliography ==
As Camilla Trinchieri:

- The Price of Silence (2007)
- Seeking Alice (2016)

The Tuscan Mystery Series

- Murder in Chianti (2020)
- The Bitter Taste of Murder (2021)
- Murder on the Vine (2022)
- The Road to Murder (2024)
- Murder in Pitigliano (2025)

As Trella Crespi: (Simona Griffo Mystery Series)

- The Trouble with a Small Raise (1991)
- The Trouble with Moonlighting (1991)
- The Trouble with Too Much Sun (1992)

As Camilla T. Crespi:

- The Trouble with Thin Ice (1993)
- The Trouble with Going Home (1995)
- The Trouble with a Bad Fit: A Novel of Food, Fashion and Mystery (1996)
- The Trouble with a Hot Summer (1997)
- The Breakfast Club Murder (2014)
