= Pauline Hamilton Dederer =

American biologist (1878–1960)

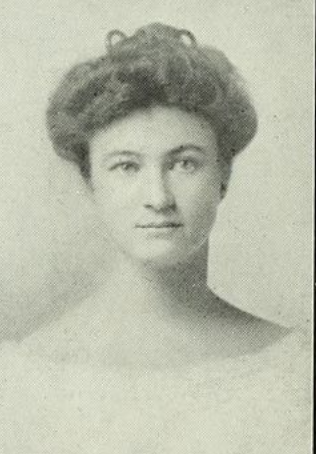
- Pauline H. Dederer, from the 1914 yearbook of Barnard College
- Born: October 2, 1878; Hoboken, New Jersey
- Died: August 20, 1960 (aged 81); Red Bank, New Jersey
- Occupations: Biologist, college professor

Pauline Hamilton Dederer (October 2, 1878 – August 20, 1960) was an American biologist. She taught at Barnard College and Connecticut College.

== Early life and education ==
Pauline Hamilton Dederer was born in Hoboken, New Jersey, the daughter of Charles H. Dederer and Martha Martin Paul Dederer. Her mother owned a hotel in Sea Bright, New Jersey. She graduated from Barnard College in 1901, and earned a master's degree from Columbia University in 1907. In 1903 she did embryological research at Woods Hole Oceanographic Institution.

== Career ==
Dederer taught at Barnard College and worked in the Zoological Laboratory at Columbia until 1917. In 1909 she spent a summer working at Harpswell Laboratory in Harpswell, Maine. After 1917, she served on the Board of Fellows at Connecticut College and was made a full professor of biology there in 1922.

In 1922, Dederer was a member of the Field Investigators Training Corps of the Eugenics Record Office. She made headlines for teaching an undergraduate course in genetics in 1930, which included eugenic advice about marriage and children. "Our girls go out from this course with critical knowledge of the salient facts, an interest in human genetics, and a realization of its importance in relation to psychological and social problems," she explained.

In 1921, she wrote "What is a College Education For?" for The Woman Citizen. She was president of the New London branch of the American Association of University Women.

== Selected publications ==
- "Spermatogenesis in Philosamia cynthia" (1907)
- "Comparison of Caenolestes with Polyprotodonta and Diprotodonta" (1909)
- "Pressure Experiments on the Egg of Cerebratulus lacteus" (1910)
- "Oogenesis in Philosamia cynthia" (1915)
- "The Behavior of Cells in Tissue Cultures of Fundulus heteroclitus with Special Reference to the Ectoderm" (1921)
- "Variations in chromosome number in the spermatogenesis of Philosamia cynthia" (1928)
- "Polyovular follicles in the cat" (1934)
- "The production of giant spermatocytes in philosamia cynthia by means of x-rays" (1940)

== Personal life ==
Dederer died in 1960, aged 81 years, in Red Bank, New Jersey.
