= Piccolo Concerto =

2021 concerto by Amanda Harberg

The Piccolo Concerto by Amanda Harberg is a concerto for piccolo in three movements. The piece was commsioned by the Philadelphia Orchestra and first conducted under the baton of Yannick Nézet-Séguin as part of the Philadelphia Orchestra's Digital Stage series at the outbreak of the COVID-19 pandemic. The concerto was co-commissioned by the orchestra's piccoloist Erica Peel, and has been described as one of the most important works for the instrument. The Chicago Symphony subsequently described Harberg as "something of a hero to the flute and piccolo community along the way."

The concerto has received worldwide recognition from the likes of John Corigliano and Yannick Nézet-Séguin, who said the concerto is “an extraordinary addition to the limited repertoire” after performance. The concerto has also been performed by international orchestras and at schools including the Mason Gross School of the Arts and Berklee College of Music, where Harberg teaches. The concerto is noted for its jazz influence and textural cohesion. Additionally, Elizabeth McCormack won the New England Conservatory concerto competition with the concerto.

== Composition ==
Harberg wrote the Concerto for Piccolo in 2022 at Rutgers University's Mason Gross School of the Arts, where she worked at the time. Originally conceived as the Sonata for piccolo and piano, the piece was subsequently expanded and orchestrated (the sonata received the premiere at the National Flute Association with Regina Yost on piccolo). It is in three movements, marked thus:

1. Allegro
2. Moderato, dreamy
3. Vivace

A performance takes approximately 15 minutes.

The concerto is scored for a solo piccolo and orchestra comprising harp, timpani, percussion (two players), strings (violins I & II, violas, violoncellos, and double basses).
