= Emma Dietz Stecher =

American chemist

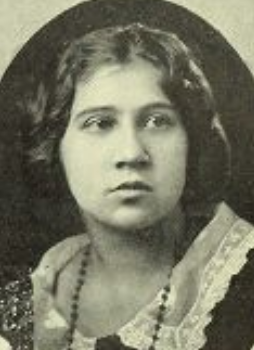
- Emma Dietz, later Stecher, from the 1925 yearbook of Barnard College
- Born: Emma Margaret Dietz; September 23, 1905; Brooklyn, New York, U.S.
- Died: December 6, 1998 (aged 93)
- Other name: Emma Dietz Schultz
- Occupations: Biochemist, college professor
- Known for: Professor at Barnard College, 1945 to 1971

Emma Margaret Dietz Schultz Stecher (September 23, 1905 – December 6, 1998) was an American organic chemist. She was a professor at Barnard College from 1945 to 1971.

== Early life and education ==
Dietz was born in Brooklyn, New York, the daughter of Nicholas Dietz and Emma Weidt Dietz. Her mother was active in church work; her father was a lawyer. She graduated from Barnard College in 1925, earned a master's degree from Columbia University in 1926, and completed doctoral studies at Bryn Mawr College in 1929. Her older brother Nicholas Dietz Jr. also became a professor of biochemistry.

== Career ==
Dietz held a post-doctoral appointment as a researcher at Harvard University from 1929 to 1934, working with James B. Conant. In 1934 she went to Munich as a postdoctoral fellow, funded by the American Association of University Women (AAUW). From 1935 to 1937 she was a research chemist for Hercules Powder Company in Delaware. She taught chemistry at Moravian College from 1938 to 1941, and at Connecticut College from 1941 to 1943. She returned to industrial work as a chemist at General Aniline Company in Pennsylvania from 1943 to 1945.

After World War II, Stecher was a chemistry professor and pre-med adviser at her alma mater, Barnard College, from 1945 to 1971, and was an adjunct professor at Pace University from 1971 to 1983. In 1955 she received funding from the National Science Foundation (NSF) for research on benzylidenepyruvic acids. She received another NSF grant for science education in 1961.

== Publications ==
- "Studies in the Chlorophyll Series. XII. The Phaeopurpurins" (1934, with William F. Ross)
- "The Reaction of Fluorenone and Diazomethane—A New Route to 9-Phenanthrol Derivatives" (1940, with Raymond F. Schultz and John Cochran)
- "Ionization Constants and Rates of Ester Hydrolysis in the Benzylidenepyruvic Acid Series" (1952, with Helen Frances Ryder)
- "Enol-lactone Tautomers of β-Bromobenzylidenepyruvic Acids" (1954, with Ann Clements)
- "Dissociation Constants of Acids and Rates of Alkaline Hydrolysis of Esters in the Benzylidenepyruvic Acid Series" (1957, with Frances Dunn and Ernestine Gelblum)
- "Benzylidenepyruvic Acids. IV.1a o-Nitrobenzylidenepyruvic Acid and Its Enol-Lactone Tautomer" (1961, with Ernestine Gelblum)
- "Benzylidenepyruvic Acids. V. m-Nitrobenzylidenepyruvic Acid and Its Enol—Lactone Tautomer" (1965, with Anita Waldmann and Diane Fabiny)
- "Synthesis and stereochemistry of arylidenepyruvic acids and derived trans-.alpha.-bromocinnamic acids" (1973, with Mary J. Incorvia, Barbara Kerben, Dana Lavine, Margaret Cen, and Emmy Suhl)

== Personal life ==
Dietz married fellow biochemist Raymond F. Schultz. She married her second husband, Paul George Stecher, in 1944; they divorced in 1965. She died in 1998, at the age of 93.
