= Ingrith Johnson Deyrup-Olsen =

American zoologist

Ingrith Johnson Deyrup-Olsen (1919 – July 25, 2004) was an American zoologist, an expert on slugs, and a science professor interested in improving science education.

== Early life and education ==
Ingrith Johnson Deyrup was born in Englewood, New Jersey. Her father was Alvin Saunders Johnson, first president of the New School for Social Research. She earned a degree in zoology from Barnard College in 1940, and a PhD in physiology from Columbia University in 1944. All six of her siblings also attended either Barnard or Columbia.

== Career ==
Deyrup-Olsen began her academic career as an assistant professor of zoology at Barnard College, and teaching physiology at Columbia's medical school. She became a full professor at Barnard in 1959. She joined the faculty at the University of Washington in 1964. Her research focused banana slugs and on the chemical structure of the mucus they produce for locomotion. "The thing that's wonderful about slugs," she explained to a reporter, "is that they make a lot of mucus and they do it on the skin, while we make it on the inside." Her work had implications for other mucus-production topics, including cystic fibrosis.

Ingrith Deyrup-Olsen received a Guggenheim Fellowship in 1953. She was also a Fulbright Scholar in 1954, to fund work in Denmark. In 1956 she was one of two women to receive research grants from the Arctic Institute of North America, to study low-temperature adaptations in the tissues of arctic rodents. In 1992 she was honored with a Barnard Medal of Distinction. She was one of the few women to serve on committees of the American Physiological Society before 1970.

Deyrup-Olsen built a masters-level program for biology teachers at the University of Washington; she was also a co-founder of the women's studies program at the university. She was president of the university's chapter of Sigma Xi in her retirement.

Later in life, as "the slug lady," she was a guest on The David Letterman Show. In 1993, Olsen also appeared on episode 13 of Bill Nye, the Science Guy to speak about slugs and how they excrete mucus to overcome friction.

Among her students at Barnard were chemistry professor Helen M. Berman (who began working in Deyrup's laboratory as a high school student), and neuroscientist Susan Schwartz-Giblin.

== Personal life ==
Ingrith Deyrup married Danish biologist Sigurd Olsen in 1964. She was widowed when he died in 1980. She retired from the University of Washington in 1990, and died in 2004, age 85.

The Department of Biology at the University of Washington offers two scholarships named for Deyrup-Olsen: one for excellent graduate student teaching, and one for an undergraduate studying biology.
