= E. Susan Garsh =

American judge (born 1947)

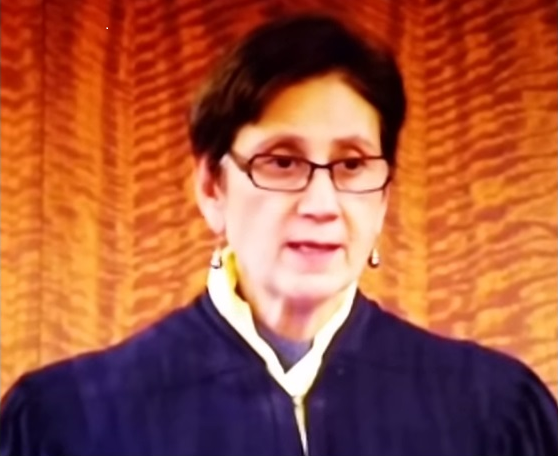

Associate Justice to the Massachusetts Superior Court
- In office 1993–2017
- Appointed by: Gov. Bill Weld

Personal details
- Born: May 18, 1947 (age 79) Fall River, Massachusetts
- Education: Harvard Law School

Eleanor Susan Garsh (born 18 May 1947) is an American judge who was an Associated Justice to the Massachusetts Superior Court in Bristol County, Massachusetts. She was appointed to the position in 1993 by Governor William Weld, serving until her retirement in 2017. In early 2015, she began presiding over the high-profile murder case involving former professional football player Aaron Hernandez.

== Early life and education ==
Judge E. Susan Garsh was born to immigrant parents Henry and Rita Speier on May 18, 1947, in the Massachusetts town of Fall River. Both a daughter, and granddaughter of Russian Jewish Immigrants, her father fled Nazi storm troopers during World War II and settled in Fall River, Massachusetts, finding work in a textile factory. Her grandfather several decades before that had escaped from pogroms in Russia, coming to America and finding work as a peddler. Susan's husband is also an immigrant who left the apartheid regime of the Republic of South Africa and came to Boston, where he found work with a weekly newspaper. Susan Garsh stands as an advocate of immigrant rights and legal process. In speaking about her husband and family, she is quoted as saying "These immigrants all arrived in this commonwealth with great hope and with great faith in our system of justice – hope and faith that proved to be well-placed."

Garsh attended Durfee High School where she graduated in 1965. Upon graduation of high school, Garsh went on with her education at Barnard College in New York City where she graduated in 1969. Following completion of her degree, Garsh attended Harvard Law School where she earned her J.D. in 1973. Following her time at Harvard University, Garsh served as a law clerk for Honorable Judge Levin Campbell of the United States Court of Appeals for the First Circuit in Boston, Massachusetts. Following her service under Judge Campbell, Garsh joined the international law firm of Bingham, Dana and Gould (later Bingham McCutchen). Her partnership at this institution focused on litigation and lasted from 1975 to 1993. Garsh ended her time as an attorney in the private sector when she became a judge in 1993.

== Judicial career ==
The Judicial Career of E. Susan Garsh began in 1993 when she was appointed by Governor William Weld to the position of Associate Justice of the Massachusetts Superior Court. As a Superior Court Judge in Massachusetts, Garsh remained in her position until her retirement at the age of 70.

=== George Duarte Murder Trial ===
In 2010, Judge Susan Garsh presided over a murder case involving the shooting of a 15-year-old boy named Edwin Medina. The trial took place in New Bedford Superior Court and was the last criminal case to be tried in the historical courthouse. This was the same courtroom where the famous trial of Lizzie Borden was held in 1893. The offender, George Duarte, was accused of killing the boy at a New Year's Eve party. During the trial, Judge Garsh and State prosecutor William McCauley repeatedly clashed. McCauley accused Garsh of being antagonistic towards the Commonwealth's case. Following the jury's guilty verdict, McCauley was described as shocked. Throughout the course of the trial, McCauley believed that Garsh did not have the experience necessary to preside over serious murder trials such as that of Duarte. McCauley stated after the trial, "We expect and demand more from the witnesses and the judges who hear these most serious cases." Judge Garsh did not comment on the remarks of McCauley.

=== Aaron Hernandez Murder Trial ===
The defendant in the case is former NFL professional football player, Aaron Hernandez, who is accused of shooting to death former amateur football player Odin Lloyd. The trial began in January 2015 in Bristol County, Massachusetts where Hernandez is being held in a segregated unit in the Bristol County jail. The case has drawn a deluge of national news networks covering the case.

In June 2013 the defendant, Aaron Hernandez was taken from his home in North Attleboro, Massachusetts, after he was arrested in connection with the murder of Odin Lloyd, who had been found shot to death just six days prior. Hernandez employed the Boston-based law firm of Ropes and Gray to defend him in court. The prosecution in the case is spearheaded by William McCauley, the same prosecutor who in 2010 had butted heads with Judge Garsh. When Judge Susan Garsh was named presiding judge over the Hernandez case, Prosecutor William McCauley asked that she recuse herself due to their prior conflict in the Edwin Medina murder trial where McCauley had attacked her lack of experience. McCauley's motion for recusal from the Hernandez trial was unsuccessful; though Judge Garsh gave consideration to the motion, she ultimately stated: "I do not fear or favor the Commonwealth or the defendant." Since taking over the Hernandez case, Judge Garsh and McCauley have again butted heads, this time over Garsh's suppression of certain key prosecution evidence. Some of the items suppressed include .45 caliber bullets of the variety used in the slaying of Lloyd, an iPad, cell phone and towel, all of which were deemed improperly seized from the SUV and home of Hernandez. However, Judge Garsh has allowed the Hernandez home surveillance video to be used.

== Memberships ==
Judge Garsh is a member of the American Bar Association, Boston Bar Association, Massachusetts Bar Association, Women's Bar Association and The National Association of Woman Judges.

== Publications ==
Judge Garsh penned an article for the Massachusetts Law Review entitled "White Doves in 2010". The article discusses briefly the immigration history of Garsh's parents and her husband. In the article, Garsh elaborates on the naturalization ceremonies over which she presides. At her request, the Superior Court interpreters translated the phrase "My fellow Americans, Welcome" into 19 different languages so that she might begin the welcome process with just a snippet of each immigrants' own language.
