= Sasha Cagen =

American editor and writer

Sasha Cagen is an American writer, editor, and entrepreneur and originator of the quirkyalone movement. Her first book was Quirkyalone: A Manifesto for Uncompromising Romantics (Harper, San Francisco, 2004), and her second book To-Do List: From Buying Milk to Finding a Soul Mate, What Our Lists Reveal About Us, a collection of 100 handwritten lists and the stories behind them, was released by Simon & Schuster in November 2007.

== Biography ==
A native of Cranston, Rhode Island, Cagen attended Amherst College and graduated from Barnard College.

Cagen got her start as a writer in the "girl zine revolution," writing about topics ranging from the class politics of attending an elite women's college to the taste of grape soda and the fear of being pushed or pushing someone else into the subway tracks. During the mid-1990s, in New York, Cagen co-edited the self-published Cupsize.

In 2010, Cagen left San Francisco to travel in South America where she also promoted Quirkyalone in Rio de Janeiro, Brazil. She has since become a life coach and a leading advocate of self-marriage as a ritual of acknowledgment and self-acceptance for women and men.

Her travels led her to settle in Buenos Aires where she works with tango to help women clients reconnect with their sensuality. As part of her tango teaching. she developed and coined the term "Pussywalking" to help women connect to their embodied feminine power.

She is the founding editor and publisher of To-Do List, a "magazine of meaningful minutiae" that used the idea of a to-do list to explore the details of daily life. Among other major recognition, To-Do List was named Best New Magazine of 2000 in Utne's Alternative Press Awards, Reader's Choice.

Cagen cofounded StyleMob, a social networking site "dedicated to real people and their style." The site started in early 2007, and received media coverage.

Cagen has appeared on the BBC, Anderson Cooper 360, CNN Headline News, Countdown with Keith Olbermann, and NPR's "Day to Day" and "Talk of the Nation". Cagen's essays have appeared in newspapers and magazines including the Village Voice, Utne Reader, and Men's Health.

Cagen is reportedly currently at work on a memoir about her travels in South America. She splits her time between Buenos Aires and the U.S.

== Bibliography ==
- Quirkyalone: A Manifesto for Uncompromising Romantics (Harper San Francisco, 2004)
- To-Do List: From Buying Milk to Finding a Soul Mate, What Our Lists Reveal About Us (Simon & Schuster, 2007)
