= Amanda Harberg =

American classical composer

- Born: Amanda Harberg; May 11, 1973 (age 53); New York City, US
- Genres: Classical
- Occupation: Composer

Amanda Harberg (born 1973) is an American composer and pianist of classical music whose work has been performed internationally. She is currently on the composition faculty at the Berklee College of Music, and has been on the faculty at the Juilliard School as well as the Mason Gross School of the Arts at Rutgers University. Her work has been performed by leading orchestras worldwide like the New York Philharmonic, Philadelphia Orchestra, Los Angeles Philharmonic, Juilliard School, and New England Conservatory.

Notable students include Tito Muñoz. She is notable for orchestral work like her Piccolo Concerto, Clarinet Concerto, and Tuba Sonata, as well as wind band work.

== Biography ==
Harberg was raised in Philadelphia, Pennsylvania, and studied piano and composition in her early youth, completing her first composition at the age of 5. She earned a BM and Masters in Music from the Juilliard School as the only undergraduate in her class, studying with Stephen Albert, David Diamond, and Robert Beaser, graduating with the Peter Mennin prize and as the only female student. She subsequently received a Fulbright–Hays Fellowship to study in Europe with Frederic Rzewski at the Royal Conservatory of Liege. Harberg also studied piano under György Sándor, a protége of Bela Bartok, and took classes at Columbia University and Barnard College and later received a PhD from Rutgers University under Robert Aldridge.

Harberg's music has been praised by The New York Times as "a sultry excursion into lyricism." Yannick Nézet-Séguin said that Harberg "shrugs off the mundane and explores the unexpected." John Corigliano stated that "she invigorates the brain and touches the soul. I love her work."

She has been commissioned by the Philadelphia Orchestra Association, the Juilliard School, New World Symphony, Albany Symphony Orchestra, New Jersey Youth Symphony, Dorian Wind Quintet, Bay Atlantic Symphony, Harmonium Choral Society, Network for New Music, and Grand Rapids Symphony. Her music has been performed by Martin Chalifour, Dennis Kim, Mindy Kaufman, John Thorne, Erica Peel, YaoGuang Zhai, Valerie Coleman, Robert Langevin, Julietta Curenton, Adrian Morejon, Benjamin Fingland, and Jessica Myer. Yannick Nézet-Séguin, JoAnn Falletta, David Alan Miller, and David Lockington have conducted her work. Her music has been performed in venues like Carnegie Hall, Lincoln Center, Disney Hall, Verizon Hall, and the Symphony Center and has been awarded two New Jersey State Council on the Arts Fellowships, a New York State Council on the Arts fellowship, a MacDowell Colony summer residency, New York Youth Symphony First Music Award, and nine National Flute Association Newly Published Music awards.

Harberg has worked on the faculty for Rutgers University's Mason Gross School of the Arts and the Juilliard School's Advancement Program. She is currently on the composition faculty for the Berklee College of Music. She has had residencies at schools like Northwestern University's Bienen School of Music, DePaul University, Arizona State University, Lawrence University, University of Nevada, Coastal Carolina University, and Ohio University. She is published by Schott Music.

== Compositions ==
=== Orchestra ===
- Elegy (2007) for viola and string orchestra
- Viola Concerto (2012) for viola and orchestra
- Of Earth and Air (2013) orchestra
- Elegy (2013) for orchestra
- Prayer (2014) for orchestra
- Solis (2015) for orchestra
- On Rousseau (2016) for orchestra; commissioned by the Bay Atlantic Symphony
- Piccolo Concerto (2021) for piccolo and orchestra; performed by Yannick Nézet-Séguin conducting the Philadelphia Orchestra with soloist Erica Peel
- Clarinet Concerto (2022) for clarinet and orchestra; also version for wind band

=== Chamber music ===
- On the Edge (1997) for two cellos
- Poem and Transformation (2000) for flute and piano
- Tenement Rhapsody (2005) for two pianos or clarinet ensemble (2011)
- Elegy (2017) for viola and piano
- Philadelphia Suite (2007) for viola and piano
- Birding in the Palisades (2009) for flute and piano
- Prayer (2011) for flute or viola and piano
- Venus Unhinged (2011) for two amplified sopranos, flute, oboe, clarinet in Bb, bassoon, soprano saxophone, baritone saxophone, horn, trumpet in C, trombone, percussion, synthesizer, two violins, viola, cello, bass
- Feathers and Wax (2014) for flute and piano; Winner of the 2016 National Flute Association Newly Published Music award
- Sonata for Clarinet and Piano (2015) for clarinet in Bb and piano
- Sadie’s Birthday Adventures (2016) for narrator, clarinet (bass Bb), bass trombone, double bass, percussion, and piano
- Court Dances (2017) for flute and piano
- Suite for Wind Quintet (2017) for flute, oboe, clarinet, horn, and bassoon
- Sonata for Piccolo and Piano (2018) for piccolo and piano
- Mementos (2020) for flute and guitar
- Fever Dreams (2020) for three piccolos and piano
- Luca’s Garden (2021) for clarinet in Bb, violin, cello, and piano
- Bassoon Sonata (2021) for bassoon and piano
- Crossroads (2022) for flute, clarinet in A or English horn, and piano
- Aria (2022) for flute, clarinet in A, and piano
- Tuba Sonata (2023) for tuba and piano
- This! (2023) for solo flute and flute ensemble
- Oh, Snap! (2024) for clarinet in Bb and piano

=== Choral music ===
- Apparitions (2008) for SATB a cappella chorus
- This! (2022) for flute and SATB a cappella chorus

=== Solo non-piano music ===
- For Sydney (2011) for solo viola
- Toccata (2013) for organ; Commissioned by the Grand Rapids Presbyterian Church for organist Helen Hofmeister Hawley.
- Don’t Forget to Write (2020) for solo clarinet or piccolo

=== Solo piano music ===
- Piano Sonata (1992) for solo piano
- 5 Short Pieces (1994) for solo piano
- Breathing Songs (2002) for solo piano
- Up Up and Away (2010) for solo piano
- A Conversation (2015) for piano solo
- Rock Star (2015) for piano solo
- Windswept (2015) for piano solo
- When We Sat for Tea (2015) for piano solo
- Woodland Toccata (2015) for piano solo
- Four Sisters (2024) for solo piano

== Discography ==
Title	Year	Album	Record label
"Aria from Viola Concerto" (Brett Duebner and the Southern Arizona Symphony Orchestra with violist Linus Lerner)	2024	Classical Hidden Gems, Vol.1	Naxos Records
"Court Dances" (Ewa Kowalski and Anna Rutkowska-Schock)	2024	HER JOURNEY: flute and piano works by women	Da Vinci Classics
"Suite for Wind Quintet" (Aspen Winds)	2023	Aspen Winds 2023	Aspen Winds
"Feathers and Sax" (Paul Cohen, Louis Anderson)	2022	Soprano Summit	Ravello Records
"Court Dances" (Julian Velasco and Winston Choi)	2022	As We Are	Cedille Records
"Feathers and Wax" (Julietta Curenton)	2021	Feathers and Wax	Julietta Curenton
"Hall of Ghosts" (Snježana Pavičević)	2020	Piccolo Solo Globe Tour	Nota Bene Records
"Philly Suite" (Brett Deubner and Caroline Fauchet)	2017	Deep Sky Blue	Undici 07 s.a.s. di Maurizio Bignone
"Amanda Harberg: Viola Concerto and Elegy - Max Wolpert: Viola Concerto No.1 “Giants”" (Brett Duebner and the Southern Arizona Symphony Orchestra with violist Linus Lerner)	2017	Amanda Harberg: Viola Concerto and Elegy - Max Wolpert: Viola Concerto No.1 “Giants”	Naxos American Classics
"Subway" (Stephen Gosling and Blair McMillen)	2015	Powerhouse Pianists II	American Modern Recordings
"Feathers and Wax" (Eileen Strempel and Sylvie Beaudette)	2015	Mythavian	Corbus Du Toit
"Tenement Rhapsody" (New York Licorice Ensemble)	2013	New American Works for Clarinet Ensemble	NAR Records]l
"Birding in the Palisades" (Marni Nixon with the Palisades Virtuosi)	2012	New American Masters, Vol.4	Albany Records
"Midnight Songs: Memory" (Colbus Du Toit and Doreen Lee)	2009	Feathers and Wax	Centaur Records
