= Rohit Pappu =

American biophysicist

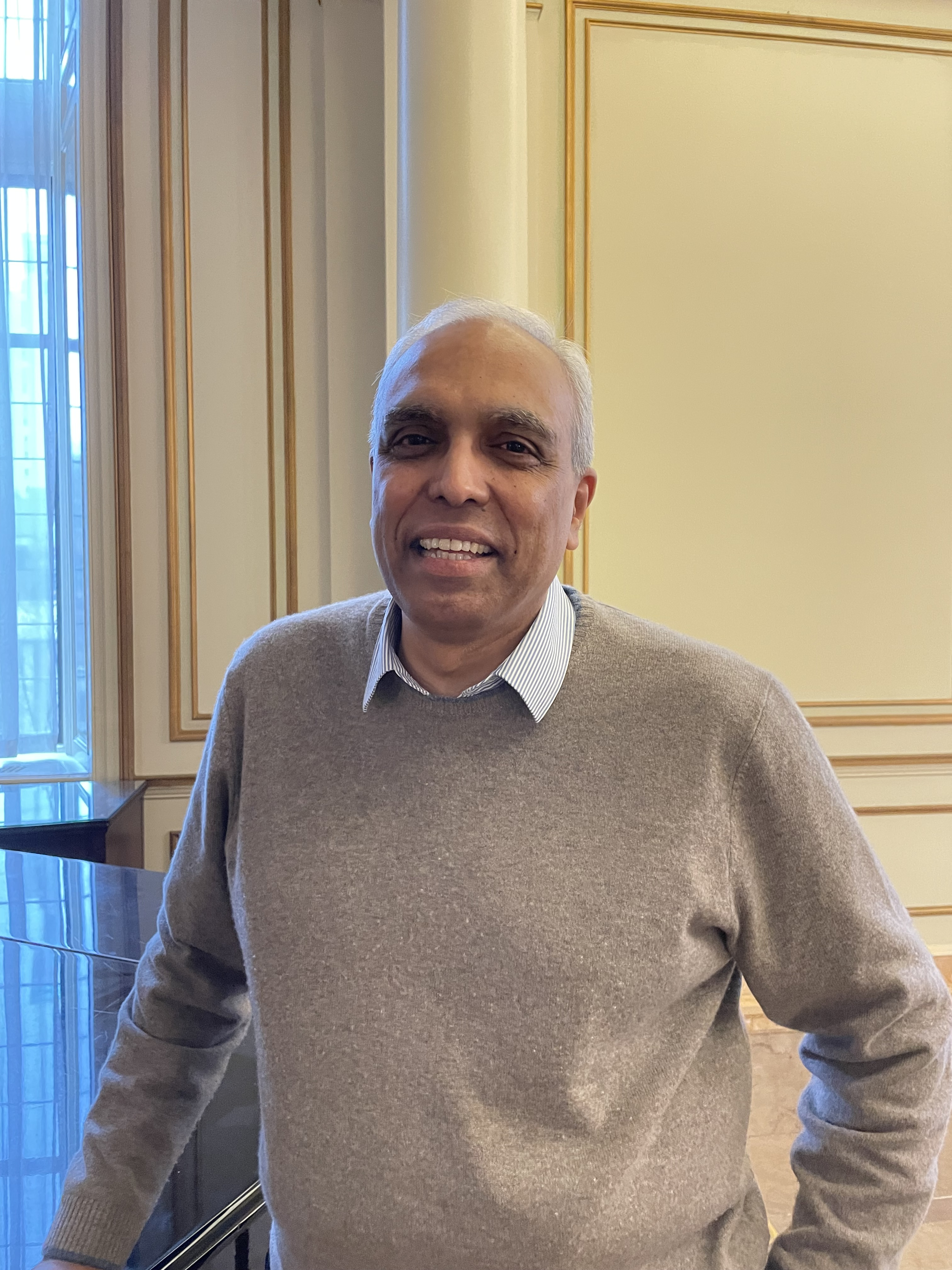
- Rohit Pappu at the 2023 Keystone Symposia Conference on Biomolecular Condensates in Vancouver
- Education: Tufts University, St. Joseph's College, Bangalore
- Known for: Intrinsically disordered proteins, Huntington's disease, Protein folding, Biomolecular condensate
- Scientific career
- Fields: Biophysics
- Workplaces: Washington University in St. Louis, Johns Hopkins University
- Doctoral advisor: David L. Weaver

Rohit Pappu is an Indian-born computational and molecular biophysicist. He is the Gene K. Beare Distinguished Professor of Engineering at the McKelvey School of Engineering and the director of the Center for Biomolecular Condensates (CBC) at Washington University in St. Louis.

== Education and career ==
Pappu did his undergraduate work in physics, mathematics, and electronics at the St. Joseph's University, Bangalore. He received an M.S. in solid-state physics in 1992 and Ph.D. in biological physics in 1996, both at Tufts University where he worked on theoretical aspects of protein folding. He spent two years as a postdoctoral fellow at Washington University in St. Louis with Jay Ponder and then from 1998 to 2001 he was a postdoctoral fellow with George Rose at Johns Hopkins University. He joined Washington University in St. Louis as an Assistant Professor in Biomedical Engineering in 2001, becoming Associate Professor in 2007 and Professor in 2011. He was inducted as the Edwin H. Murty Professor of Engineering in 2015, and as the Gene K. Beare Distinguished Professor in the Fall of 2021.

== Research ==
Pappu uses theoretical, computational, and experimental approaches to study intrinsically disordered proteins in the context of normal cellular function and neurodegenerative diseases (notably Huntington's disease). He has made major contributions to understanding the driving forces associated with protein aggregation, and how the linear amino acid sequence of a disordered proteins determines its conformational behaviour, with a particular focus on the role of polar and charged amino acids. With postdoctoral fellow Rahul Das, Pappu discovered that the patterning of charged residues has a major impact on the conformational ensemble of a disordered protein. More recently, his work has focussed on the polymer physics of biological phase transitions to understand the theoretical and molecular underpinnings that drive intracellular phase separation.

Pappu was named a fellow of the American Association for the Advancement of Science (AAAS) in 2013, and in 2016 was elected as a fellow of the American Institute for Medical and Biological Engineering (AIMBE) for "outstanding contributions to protein engineering and design and the molecular basis of neurodegeneration through advances in computational biology". In 2019, Pappu was named a fellow of the Biophysical Society for "ingeniously implementing polymer physics approaches and molecular simulations to characterize intrinsically disordered proteins", and as a Mercator Fellow by the German Science Foundation (Deutsche Forschungsgemeinschaft).
