= Helen M. Berman =

American chemist

Helen Berman
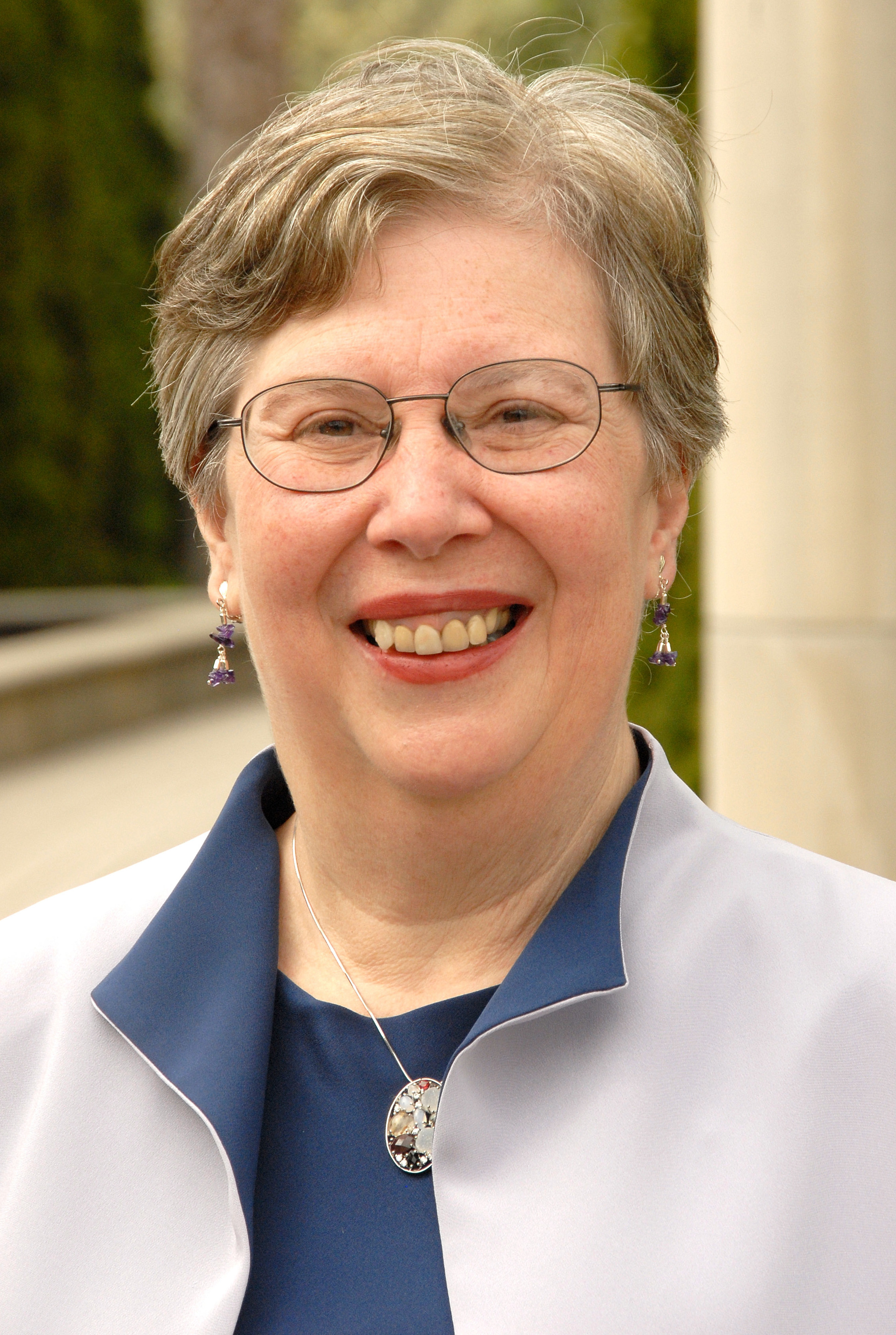
- Helen Berman in 2008.
- Born: Helen Miriam Berman; 1943 (age 82–83); Chicago, Illinois
- Education: Barnard College; University of Pittsburgh
- Spouses: Victor Berman; Peter Young (1976–1999)
- Children: 1
- Awards: DeLano Award (2013); Benjamin Franklin Award (2014)
- Scientific career
- Fields: Structural biology; Structural Bioinformatics; Databases
- Workplaces: University of Southern California, Rutgers University
- Thesis: The Crystal Structures of Alpha Prime and Beta-D-Mannitol, Galacticol, Methyl Aalpha-D-Glucopyranoside and Hydroxyurea (1967)
- Doctoral advisor: George A. Jeffrey
- Other academic advisors: Barbara Low, Jenny Glusker
- Website: dornsife.usc.edu/profile/helen-berman/

Helen Miriam Berman is an American chemist who is a Distinguished Professor of Quantitative and Computational Biology at the USC Dornsife College of Letters, Arts and Sciences. She is also a Board of Governors Professor Emerita of Chemistry and Chemical Biology at Rutgers University and a former director of the RCSB Protein Data Bank (one of the member organizations of the Worldwide Protein Data Bank). A structural biologist, her work includes structural analysis of protein-nucleic acid complexes, and the role of water in molecular interactions. She is also the founder and director of the Nucleic Acid Database, and led the Protein Structure Initiative Structural Genomics Knowledgebase. She is a Fellow of the American Academy of Arts and Sciences and Fellow of the National Academy of Sciences.

== Background and education ==
Berman was born in Chicago, Illinois, and grew up in Brooklyn, New York. Her father, David Bernstein, was a physician and her mother, Dorothy Bernstein (née Skupsky), managed her father's office practice. Inspired by her hard-working and scholarly father, she was interested in science as a young girl and planned to become a scientist or doctor. Her mother, who was strongly involved in the community and volunteer work, influenced her to be involved in community activities throughout her life.

During high school, Berman worked in Ingrith Deyrup's laboratory at Barnard College. Deyrup encouraged Berman to attend Barnard as an undergraduate. While at college, she worked in a Columbia University College of Physicians and Surgeons laboratory with Barbara Low. There, Berman learned about crystallography, which would become a lifelong passion. She graduated from Barnard with an A.B. in chemistry in 1964.

Following college, Berman attended the University of Pittsburgh for graduate school, a place she selected because it was the only place in the country with a crystallography department, and one of the few where crystallography was offered as a subject. There she worked with George A. Jeffrey on carbohydrate structure, receiving her Ph.D. in 1967. Berman remained at the University of Pittsburgh for two more years as a postdoctoral research fellow.

== Career ==
In 1969, Berman moved to the Fox Chase Cancer Center in Philadelphia, where she worked in Jenny P. Glusker's laboratory before starting her own independent research program as a faculty member in 1973. At Fox Chase, Berman became interested in nucleic acid structures and in bioinformatics. She knew that logical organization of data would make it useful to a variety of scientists.

In June 1971, Berman attended a symposium at Cold Spring Harbor Laboratory, where several scientists agreed that data on the expanding number of protein structures should be archived in a database. That meeting led to the creation of the Protein Data Bank (PDB) at Brookhaven National Laboratory.

In 1989, Berman moved to Rutgers and in 1992, along with other scientists, she co-founded the Nucleic Acid Database (NDB) to collect and disseminate information about nucleic acid structure. At Rutgers, she continued to study nucleic acids, their interactions with proteins, and also researched the structure of collagen in collaboration with Barbara Brodsky and Jordi Bella. She is listed as a depositor on 38 structures in the PDB from 1992 to 2011, of protein/nucleic acid complexes and their components (e.g. 1RUN, 3SSX, 2B1B), collagen fragments (e.g. 1CGD, 1EI8), and other macromolecules.

In 1998, Berman and Philip Bourne together competed for and won the contract for the Protein Data Bank and the database moved from Brookhaven to the auspices of the Research Collaboratory for Structural Bioinformatics (RCSB), currently a collaboration between Rutgers and the University of California, San Diego. With colleagues, Berman redesigned the data management system, added new user tools, and made the database searchable. Since 2003, the PDB archive has been managed by the worldwide Protein Data Bank (wwPDB), a partnership founded by Berman that consists of organizations that act as deposition, data processing and distribution centers for PDB data – the RCSB, the PDBe in Europe, and the PDBj in Japan. Berman served as the Director-Emerita of the PDB after serving as its Director (1998-2014). In 2006 the BioMagResData (BMRB) databank for Nuclear Magnetic Resonance (NMR) structures became the fourth member of the wwPDB. As of July, 2018, the NDB holds over 9600 nucleic acid structures and the PDB holds more than 142,000 macromolecular structures.

Also led by the RCSB, the Protein Structure Initiative (PSI) Structural Genomics Knowledgebase was launched in the Spring of 2008 to provide a continuously updated portal to research data and other resources from the PSI efforts.

Berman has also been active in the scientific community, serving as president of the American Crystallographic Association in 1988, advising both the National Institutes of Health and the National Science Foundation, and serving on the editorial board of several journals. Her work has been widely published in peer reviewed scientific journals.

Berman was the executive producer and creator of the documentary series Target Zero which focuses on the medical as well as the social aspects of HIV treatment and prevention. The three short films interweave real-life patient stories, interviews with leading doctors, medical providers and scientists; and state of the art molecular animations. These accounts illuminate the complex history of controlling the HIV epidemic and reveal the ongoing need for compassionate, patient-centered care and a true understanding on a cellular level the science behind the treatments.

== Honors and awards ==
- New Jersey Woman of Achievement (1993)
- Fellow, American Association for the Advancement of Science (1996)
- Outstanding Woman Scientist Award, Association for Women in Science, New York Chapter (1999)
- Distinguished Lecturer, Sigma Xi: The Scientific Research Society (2007–2009)
- Distinguished Service Award, Biophysical Society (2000)
- Fellow, Biophysical Society (2001)
- M.J. Buerger Award, American Crystallographic Association (2006)
- Department of Chemistry Alumni Award from the University of Pittsburgh (2010)
- American Crystallographic Association Fellow (2011)
- Carl Brändén Award from the Protein Society (2012)
- DeLano Award for Computational Biosciences from the American Society for Biochemistry and Molecular Biology (2013)
- Benjamin Franklin Award for Open Access in the Life Sciences (2014)
- Fellow, International Society for Computational Biology (2016)
- Fellow, American Academy of Arts and Sciences (2018)
- Fellow, National Academy of Sciences (2023)

== Personal life ==
Berman has been married twice, to engineer Victor Berman in the 1960s, and to molecular biologist Peter Young from 1976 to 1999. From the second marriage she has a son, Jason Asher Young (born 1979), a physicist.

During the 1980s, Berman was diagnosed with breast cancer. The experience made her more focused in her life and her career, and interested in supporting other women who face the same diagnosis.
