= Elizabeth Waterman Gilboy =

American economist (1903–1973)

- Elizabeth Lane Waterman, c 1920
- Born: Elizabeth Lane Waterman; September 24, 1903; Boston, Massachusetts, U.S.
- Died: October 10, 1973 (aged 70); Waltham, Massachusetts, U.S.

Academic background
- Education: Barnard College (AB, 1924); Radcliffe College (AM, 1925; PhD, 1929)
- Doctoral advisor: Edwin Francis Gay

Academic work
- Discipline: Economics
- Institutions: Harvard University; Radcliffe College

Elizabeth Gilboy (24 September 1903 – 9 October 1973) was an American economist and economic historian who taught at Harvard University.

== Early life and education ==
Elizabeth Lane Waterman was born on 24 September 1903 in Boston. She was the daughter of Arthur and Amy (née Lane) Waterman.

She attended the Boston Girls' Latin School, graduating in 1920. That year, Waterman earned a $600 Pulitzer scholarship to study for 4 years at Barnard College. Waterman graduated from Barnard in 1924 with a bachelor of arts degree (honours) in economics and sociology. The same year, she was awarded a graduate scholarship to Radcliffe College. Waterman then obtained a master of arts from Radcliffe in 1925 and a Ph.D from the school in 1929. While researching her PhD, she also studied at the London School of Economics and taught at Wellesley College from 1928-29.

Waterman doctorate superviser was Edwin Francis Gay. Her research concerned the living standards of the working class in 18th century England as a result of the industrial revolution of which there were competing theories. In January 1926, she was one of nine women who petitioned Allyn Young, the chair of Harvard's economics department, to attend the all male "Economics Seminary".

== Career ==
Waterman became a graduate advisor at Radcliffe, working in the role from 1930-1941. She served as an economist at the Office of Strategic Services from 1942-1943.

After World War II, Waterman taught economics at the Radcliffe and, its male counterpart, Harvard. She carried out research into consumption, unemployment and work relief programmes, and the effect of market demand in bringing about the Industrial Revolution.

She was also the Secretary-General of the International Conference on Input-Output Techniques in Geneva.

== Personal life and death ==
Waterman married Glennon Gilboy in 19 or 26 April 1930. He was a professor of engineering at the Massachusetts Institute of Technology (MIT). The couple divorced in November 1953. She then lived with economic historian and fellow Radcliffe alum, Elizabeth Boody Schumpeter.

Waterman died in Waltham, Massachusetts in October 1973. She was 70.

== Critical reception ==
Of her 1934 book, Wages in Eighteenth-Century England, the Sunday Oregonian said "She expanded [her doctorate thesis] into the present book, an exhaustive statistical study of daily wage rates of common labor, for the most part agricultural workers and laborers in the building trades... It is the first complete account of the real income of the working classes in the period forming the transition to modern industrialism."

== Selected works ==
- Gilboy, Elizabeth Waterman (1932-02-01). "Demand Curves by Personal Estimate". The Quarterly Journal of Economics. 46 (2): 376–384. doi:10.2307/1883236. ISSN 0033-5533.
- Gilboy, Elizabeth W. (1934) Wages in Eighteenth-Century England. Harvard University Press. Cambridge, Massachusetts.
- Gilboy, Elizabeth Waterman (1968). A Primer on the Economics of Consumption. Random House.
