= Dennis Dalton =

Dennis Gilmore Dalton is a professor of political science from the United States. From 1969 until 2008, Dalton was the Ann Whitney Olin Professor of Political Science at Barnard College, Columbia University. Dalton's work had a particular focus on the thought and leadership of Mahatma Gandhi and civil disobedience. Before his retirement from Barnard College at Columbia University, he gave lectures on political theory from Plato to the present, eastern and western philosophies. He began teaching at Barnard in 1969, teaching classes in classical and modern political theory.

== Academia ==
He received his bachelor's degree from Rutgers University (1960), his M.A. in Political Science from the University of Chicago (1962), and his Ph.D. in political theory from the University of London (1965). He started his teaching career in the Department of Economic and Political Studies, School of Oriental and African Studies, University of London where he taught graduate seminars on political thought and comparative politics. His seminar on nonviolence at Barnard related his personal experiences with close associates of Mahatma Gandhi during his years of research in India beginning in 1960 and continuing as a Fulbright Scholar to South Asia in 1994-1995.

Joining a student hunger strike in 2007 at Barnard/Columbia, advocating a more multi-cultural curriculum, Dalton told a reporter, "I want the core curriculum supplemented by writings on Gandhi, King, Malcolm X. I would like some acknowledgement of nonviolence in the Core." Since Dalton's retirement in 2008, Columbia College has added Gandhi to its Core curriculum, assigning Dalton's edition of Gandhi's political writings. Most recently, Dalton has been among a team of five editors of Columbia's Sources of Indian Traditions (2014) and he has lectured for three years at the Fromm Institute, San Francisco University.

Dalton is the author of numerous articles and books, including Mahatma Gandhi: Nonviolent Power in Action and Indian Idea of Freedom.

== Awards ==
- Senior Fulbright Scholarship for Research and Teaching in Nepal, 1994–95
- Ann Whitney Olin Senior Award for Teaching and Research, 1989–94
- Emily Gregory Award for Distinguished Teaching, Barnard College, 1978
- American Council of Learned Societies grant for research in South Africa, August 1975
- American Philosophical Institute grant for research in India, January–July 1975
- American Council of Learned Societies grant for research at the India Office Library, London, England, June–August 1972

== Books ==
- Indian Idea of Freedom: Political Thought of Swami Vivekananda, Aurobindo Ghose, Mahatma Gandhi and Rabindranath Tagore, The Academic Press, 1982
- Mahatma Gandhi: Nonviolent Power in Action (Revised ed.). Columbia University Press. 2012 [1993]. ISBN 978-0-231-15959-3.
  - Mahatma Gandhi: Nonviolent Power in Action, Columbia University Press, revised 3rd edition with new preface and afterword, 2014
- Mahatma Gandhi: Selected Political Writings, edited with introduction by Dennis Dalton, Hackett Publishers, 1996
