= Scripps Howard Awards =

List of American journalism awardees

- Awarded for: Excellence in journalism
- Country: United States
- Presented by: Scripps Howard Foundation
- Formerly called: National Journalism Awards
- First award: 1953

The Scripps Howard Awards, formerly the National Journalism Awards, are $10,000 awards in American journalism given by the Scripps Howard Foundation. Awardees receive "cash prizes, citations and plaques."

As of 2023, the categories are:

- Excellence in Audio Storytelling, honoring Jack R. Howard
- Excellence in Coverage of Breaking News
- Excellence in Business/Financial Reporting
- Excellence in Environmental Reporting, honoring Edward W. “Ted” Scripps II
- Distinguished Service to the First Amendment, honoring Edward Willis Scripps
- Excellence in Narrative Human-Interest Storytelling, Honoring Ernie Pyle
- Excellence in Innovation, honoring Roy W. Howard
- Excellence in Local/Regional Investigative Reporting
- Excellence in Local Video Storytelling, honoring Jack R. Howard
- Excellence in Multimedia Journalism
- Excellence in National/International Investigative Reporting, the Ursula and Gilbert Farfel Prize
- Excellence in National/International Video Storytelling, honoring Jack R. Howard
- Excellence in Opinion Writing
- Excellence in Visual Journalism
- Impact Award
- Teacher of the Year
- Administrator of the Year

== History ==
=== Origins: Ernie Pyle Award ===
What became the National Journalism Awards were launched in 1954 with the Ernie Pyle Award (originally supported by the Ernie Pyle Memorial Fund). The award is given annually to reporters who "most nearly exemplify the style and craftsmanship for which Ernie Pyle was known". The award was administered by the E. W. Scripps Company until the 1962 formation of the Scripps Howard Foundation. The Ernie Pyle award was later named the "Human Interest Writing Ernie Pyle Award" and is now presented as "Excellence in Narrative Human-Interest Storytelling, Honoring Ernie Pyle."

=== 1960s and '70s ===
In 1966, Scripps-Howard Newspapers conservation editor Edward J. Meeman died, and the company created the Edward J. Meeman Foundation to support journalism and conservation through grants and awards. Beginning in 1968, the Edward J. Meeman Environmental Reporting Award became the second annual award given by Scripps-Howard. Previous winners of the environmental reporting award include Ken Ward Jr., Sam Roe, Bruce Ingersoll, James V. Risser, Larry Tye, and Craig Flournoy. In 2022, the award was renamed as "Excellence in Environmental Reporting, honoring Edward W. 'Ted' Scripps II." (Note: Edward W. "Ted" Scripps II (1929–1987) was the grandson of E. W. Scripps (and the son of Robert Paine Scripps [1895–1938]). After serving as a reporter for many years, at the time of his death he was a trustee of the Scripps Howard News Service. "He was a conservationist with interests in environmental issues and changing technologies in the communications industry.")

In the 1970s, three more awards became part of the roster of journalism prizes. First, in 1972, was the Public Service Reporting Award, honoring long-time Scripps executive Roy W. Howard. The public service award was originally divided into a newspaper division and a broadcast division. In 1986, the award was restructured to recognize newspapers only, and divided into two categories — under 100,000 and over 100,000 circulation. In 2004, the circulation divisions were eliminated altogether; the award was discontinued after 2016.

In 1974, the Editorial Writing Walker Stone Award, joined the list. Currently known as the "Walker Stone Award for Opinion Writing," it was named in honor of Walker Stone (1905–1973), editor-in-chief of Scripps-Howard Newspapers.

In 1977, the First Amendment Edward Willis Scripps Award was inaugurated. "Given to the editor of the winning newspaper for distribution to the individual or individuals on the staff who contributed most significantly to the cause of the First Amendment guarantee of a free press," the award is now known as "Distinguished Service to the First Amendment, honoring Edward Willis Scripps."

By the end of the 1970s, the Scripps Howard Foundation was presenting a total of five annual journalism awards.

=== 1980s ===
In 1980, Scripps Howard added the College Cartoonist Charles M. Schulz Award, which was "funded by United Features Syndicate ... to honor Charles M. Schulz on the 30th anniversary of his comic strip, Peanuts;" Schulz himself served as a judge in the award's early years. After being presented for 30 years, the award was discontinued in 2011 "due to the lack of entries to merit its continuance."

In 1985, the Jack R. Howard Broadcast Awards for Public Service Programming began being represented. A broadcasting award, it was divided into radio and television, with each format broken into two sub-categories — large market and small market; so, four new awards. In 1991, the TV division was renamed "TV/Cable" and in 2004, the Broadcast Awards did away with the market categories, reducing the prizes awarded each year to two. After 2008, the public service programming award was restructured/eliminated.

In 1987, the Scripps Howard Foundation, in commemoration of its 25th anniversary, officially dubbed the awards the National Journalism Awards and distributed them at a banquet held in April. The total amount of cash prizes and plaques given out was worth $41,000. That same year, the Literacy Charles E. Scripps Award, began being presented, given "to any daily broadcast and/or newspaper or local cable system in the U.S. or its territories for most outstanding effort ... to overcome illiteracy in its community." The separate awards for broadcast and newspaper outlets were abandoned in 1997 (reducing two prizes to one), and the literacy award itself was discontinued after 2003.

=== 1990s ===
In 1998–1999, Scripps Howard added five new categories to the National Journalism Awards (three of which have since been discontinued).

First, the Commentary award lasted from 1998 to 2014; while the award for Excellence in Photojournalism, also launched in 1998, was renamed in 2017 as "Excellence in Visual Journalism" ("the visual documenting of some of the year’s most complex issues and events"). As of 2022, it is currently awarded as "Visual Human-Interest Storytelling."

In 1999, a new award debuted: the Business/Economics Reporting William Brewster Styles Award, recognizing "the long-time business editor for The Cincinnati Post." The award is currently called "Excellence in Business/Financial Reporting."

=== 2000–2008 ===
The year 2000 saw two new awards join the list: Editorial Cartooning and Web Reporting; both of which have since been discontinued. Editorial Cartooning lasted from 2000 to 2011, while Web Reporting lasted from 2000 to 2008.

The period 2004–2008 saw the addition of five new categories of awards (and the retirement of one, the Literacy Award).

In 2004, in partnership with the Association for Education in Journalism and Mass Communication, two new categories joined the roster: Teacher of the Year and Administrator of the Year. Also joining the list in 2004 was the Investigative Reporting Ursula and Gilbert Farfel Prize (now given as the "National/International Investigative Reporting, the Ursula and Gilbert Farfel Prize"). (Note: "Ursula and Dr. Gilbert Farfel created an endowed scholarship at Ohio University, Ursula’s alma mater, to support establishment of this award. Presented in cooperation with the Scripps College of Communication at Ohio University....")

In 2005, Scripps-Howard took over the administration of the Raymond Clapper Memorial Award, which had previously been given at the annual White House Correspondents' Association dinner. Renaming it the Washington Reporting Raymond Clapper Award, the prize was presented through 2011, when it was discontinued.

=== 2009–present ===
The period 2009–2012 saw the elimination of a number of awards, including those for Public Service Broadcasting (2009), Web Reporting (2009), the Raymond Clapper Award (2012), the two cartooning awards (2011 and 2012, respectively), and Commentary (2014).

In 2010, the National Journalism Awards were renamed the Scripps Howard Awards. In addition, two new prizes joined the roster: Coverage of Breaking News and the Jack R. Howard Award for In-Depth Radio Coverage, later amended to "Excellence in Radio/Podcast Coverage, honoring Jack R. Howard." In 2022, the award was renamed "Excellence in Audio Storytelling, honoring Jack R. Howard".

In the period 2013–2017, eight new prizes joined the Scripps Howard Awards roster. First was the Digital Innovation award, now known as "Innovation, honoring Roy W. Howard." 2016 saw four new awards, including two for video storytelling: the Jack R. Howard Award for Television/Cable In-Depth Local Coverage (currently known as "Local Video Storytelling, honoring Jack. R. Howard") and the Jack R. Howard Award for Television/Cable In-Depth National and International Coverage (currently known as the award for "National/International Video Storytelling, honoring Jack R. Howard"). Also debuting in 2016 (in partnership with the Google News Lab) was the Scripps Howard Award for Community Journalism (now known as the award for "Local/Regional Investigative Reporting"). The final new award to debut in 2016 was the Topic of the Year Award; now known as the "Impact Award", the "winner is deemed to have had the greatest impact from the list."

The newest award category in the Scripps Howard Awards is Multimedia Journalism, which debuted in 2018.

== List of awardees ==
=== Excellence in Audio Storytelling, honoring Jack R. Howard ===
Formerly known as the Jack R. Howard Award for In-Depth Radio Coverage and then Excellence in Radio/Podcast Coverage, honoring Jack R. Howard.

Year	Winner/organization
2009	Alix Spiegel, National Public Radio
2010	NPR
2011	WLRN, Miami Herald News
2012	WBEZ, Chicago Public Media
2013	This American Life
2014	Chicago Public Media, Serial: Season One
2015	Aleem Maqbool, BBC News
2016	Michigan Radio
2017	Laura Heaton and Michael Ma, NPR's Rough Translation
2018	Michigan Radio
2019	Lynn Arditi, Sally Eisele, James Baumgartner, The Public's Radio, Rhode Island
2020	Invisible Institute, The Intercept, and Topic Studios
2021	NBC News
2022	American Public Media

=== Coverage of Breaking News ===
Year	Organization
2009	Associated Press
2010	CNBC
2011	The Arizona Republic
2012	The Denver Post
2013	The Arizona Republic
2014	St. Louis Post-Dispatch
2015	The Post and Courier, Charleston, SC
2016	East Bay Times
2017	San Francisco Chronicle
2018	South Florida Sun Sentinel, Deerfield Beach
2019	The Washington Post
2020	Star Tribune, Minneapolis, MN
2021	The Tennessean, Nashville, TN
2022	The Washington Post

=== Business/Financial Reporting ===
Formerly known as the Business/Economics Reporting William Brewster Styles Award and the William Brewster Styles Award for Business/Economics Reporting.

Year	Individual Winner	Organization
1998	Richard Read	The Oregonian, Portland
1999	Tom Hallman Jr.	The Oregonian, Portland
2000	Doris Hajewski	Milwaukee Journal Sentinel
2001		The Wall Street Journal
2002		Chicago Tribune
2003	Clint Riley	The Record, Hackensack, New Jersey
2004		The Wall Street Journal
2005		The Seattle Times
2006	Steve Everly	The Kansas City Star, Missouri
2007		The Wall Street Journal
2008	Farah Stockman	The Boston Globe
2009		Sarasota Herald-Tribune, Florida
2010	Paige St. John	Sarasota Herald-Tribune, Florida
2011		ProPublica
2012		Pittsburgh Tribune-Review
2013		International Consortium of Investigative Journalists, Center for Public Integrity
2014	Rita Price and Ben Sutherly	The Columbus Dispatch
2015		The Wall Street Journal
2016		Center for Public Integrity, McClatchy, and the Miami Herald
2017	Brian Grow and John Shiffman	Reuters
2018		International Consortium of Investigative Journalists, NBC News Investigative Unit, Associated Press, and more than 50 media partners
2019	Dominic Gates, Mike Baker, Steve Miletich, and Lewis Kamb	The Seattle Times
2020		The New York Times
2021		ProPublica
2022		Los Angeles Times

=== Environmental Reporting, honoring Edward W. "Ted" Scripps II ===
Formerly known as the Environmental Reporting Edward J. Meeman Awards.

Year	Division	Individual winner	Organization
1967	—	James Ryan	St. Petersburg Times, Florida
1968	—	Betty Klaric	Cleveland Press
1969	—	Tom Brown	Anchorage Daily News, Alaska
1970	—		Detroit Free Press
1971	—	Gordon Bishop	Newark Star-Ledger, New Jersey
1972	—	Harry V. Martin	Napa Register, California
1973	—	George F. Neavoll	The Journal Gazette, Fort Wayne, Indiana
1974	—	David Cay Johnston	Detroit Free Press
1975	—	Kenneth Robison	Idaho Statesman
1976	—	Tom Turner	Arizona Daily Star, Tucson
1977	—	Bruce Ingersoll	Chicago Sun-Times
1978	—	John Hayes	Oregon Statesman
1979	—		The Philadelphia Inquirer
1980	—		Minneapolis Star
1981	Under 100,000 Circulation		Arizona Daily Star, Tucson
1981	Over 100,000 Circulation		Newsday
1982	Over 100,000 Circulation	Jonathan Harsch	The Christian Science Monitor
1982	Under 100,000 Circulation	Floyd Rogers	Winston-Salem Journal, North Carolina
1983	Over 100,000 Circulation		Orange County Register, California
1983	Under 100,000 Circulation		The Star Democrat, Easton, Maryland
1984	Over 100,000 Circulation	James V. Risser	The Des Moines Register
1984	Under 100,000 Circulation		Montgomery Advertiser, Alabama
1985	Over 100,000 Circulation		The Philadelphia Inquirer
1985	Under 100,000 Circulation	Jane Kay	Arizona Daily Star, Tucson
1986	Over 100,000 Circulation		The Seattle Times
1986	Under 100,000 Circulation		The Morning Advocate, Baton Rouge, Louisiana
1987	Over 100,000 Circulation	Natalie Forbes	The Seattle Times
1987	Under 100,000 Circulation		The Charleston Gazette, West Virginia
1988	Over 100,000 Circulation	Dennis Anderson	St. Paul Pioneer Press Dispatch, Minnesota
1988	Under 100,000 Circulation		The Charleston Gazette, West Virginia
1989	Over 100,000 Circulation		The Boston Globe
1989	Under 100,000 Circulation	Sam Atwood	The Sun, San Bernardino, California
1990	Over 100,000 Circulation		Orlando Sentinel
1990	Under 100,000 Circulation		The Alabama Journal
1991	Over 100,000 Circulation		The Times-Picayune, New Orleans
1991	Under 100,000 Circulation		Poughkeepsie Journal, New York
1992	Over 100,000 Circulation		Orlando Sentinel
1992	Under 100,000 Circulation		The National Law Journal
1993	Over 100,000 Circulation		The Dallas Morning News
1993	Under 100,000 Circulation		Mobile Register, Alabama
1994	Over 100,000 Circulation		Los Angeles Times
1994	Under 100,000 Circulation		The Charleston Gazette, West Virginia
1995	Over 100,000 Circulation		The News & Observer, Raleigh, North Carolina
1995	Under 100,000 Circulation	Tony Davis	The Albuquerque Tribune, New Mexico
1996	Over 100,000 Circulation		Mobile Register, Alabama
1996	Under 100,000 Circulation	Ken Ward	The Charleston Gazette, West Virginia
1997	Over 100,000 Circulation		The Sacramento Bee
1997	Under 100,000 Circulation		Cape Cod Times, Hyannis, Massachusetts
1998	Over 100,000 Circulation		The Seattle Times
1998	Under 100,000 Circulation		Yakima Herald-Republic, Washington
1999	Over 100,000 Circulation	Sam Roe	The Blade, Toledo, Ohio
1999	Under 100,000 Circulation	Mike Dunne	The Advocate, Baton
2000	Over 100,000 Circulation	Michael Grunwald	The Washington Post
2000	Under 100,000 Circulation	Sherry Devlin	Missoulian, Montana
2001	Over 100,000 Circulation	Julie Hauserman	St. Petersburg Times, Florida
2001	Under 100,000 Circulation	Scott Streater	Pensacola News Journal, Florida
2002	Over 100,000 Circulation	Sam Roe	Chicago Tribune
2002	Under 100,000 Circulation		Cañon City Daily Record, Colorado
2003	Over 100,000 Circulation		The Washington Post
2003	Under 100,000 Circulation		Naples Daily News, Florida
2004	—		The San Bernardino Sun, California
2005	—	Ken Ward	The Charleston Gazette, West Virginia
2006	—		Los Angeles Times
2007	—	Seth Borenstein	Associated Press
2008	—	Susanne Rust and Meg Kissinger	Milwaukee Journal Sentinel
2009	—	Charles Duhigg	The New York Times
2010	—		The Times-Picayune, New Orleans
2011	—		Pittsburgh Post-Gazette
2012	—		Los Angeles Times
2013	—	Craig Welch and Steve Ringman	The Seattle Times
2014	—	Paul Rogers and Lisa M. Krieger	San Jose Mercury News
2015	—	Neela Banerjee, John H. Cushman, Jr., David Hasemyer, and Lisa Song	Inside Climate News
2016	—	Rob Davis	The Oregonian/OregonLive
2017	—	Kale Williams	The Oregonian/OregonLive
2018	—		National Geographic
2019	—	Rob Davis	The Oregonian/OregonLive
2020	—		The Post and Courier
2021	—		ProPublica
2022	—		ProPublica, The New York Times Magazine

=== Distinguished Service to the First Amendment, honoring Edward Willis Scripps ===
Formerly known as the First Amendment Edward Willis Scripps Award.

Year	Winner
1976	The Honolulu Advertiser
1977	Sun Enterprise Newspapers
1978	Democrat and Chronicle, Rochester
1979	Ledger-Star, Norfolk, Virginia
1980	Lexington Herald-Leader, Kentucky
1981	The Des Moines Register
1982	Ledger-Enquirer, Columbus
1983	Times Leader, Wilkes-Barre
1984	Riverside Press, California
1985	The Commercial Appeal, Memphis
1986	Indianapolis News
1987	The Kentucky Post
1988	The Eagle-Tribune, Massachusetts
1989	San Francisco Chronicle
1990	Corpus Christi Caller, Texas
1991	Times Leader, Wilkes-Barre
1992	Miami Herald
1993	Tribune Chronicle, Warren, Ohio
1994	The State, Columbia, South Carolina
1995	El Vocero de Puerto Rico, San Juan
1996	Honolulu Star-Bulletin
1997	The Palm Beach Post, Florida
1998	Seven Indiana newspapers
1999	Knoxville News Sentinel, Tennessee
2000	The Des Moines Register
2001	Orlando Sentinel
2002	San Francisco Chronicle
2003	Dayton Daily News, Ohio
2004	The Dallas Morning News
2005	Post Register, Idaho Falls, Idaho
2006	San Francisco Chronicle
2007	Knoxville News Sentinel, Tennessee
2008	Josh Margolin, Ted Sherman; The Star-Ledger, Newark, New Jersey
2009	No winner named
2010	The Burlington Free Press, Vermont
2011	Yancey County News, Burnsville, N.C.
2012	The Wall Street Journal
2013	Better Government Association, Chicago
2014	Carol Rosenberg, Miami Herald
2015	Todd Wallack, The Boston Globe
2016	Eric Eyre, Charleston Gazette-Mail, West Virginia)
2017	The Kansas City Star
2018	The Dallas Morning News
2019	Jennifer Berry Hawes, Stephen Hobbs, Glenn Smith, and Seanna Adcox; The Post and Courier, Charleston, SC
2020	NPR
2021	The Arizona Republic
2022	Insider

=== Innovation, honoring Roy W. Howard ===
Formerly known as Digital Innovation.

Year	Individual Winner(s)	Organization
2012		The New York Times
2013		NPR
2014		The Wall Street Journal
2015	Stephen Stirling	NJ Advance Media
2016		ProPublica
2017		The Arizona Republic with the USA Today Network
2018		BBC
2019	Jake Godin, Jennifer Smart, and Zach Toombs	Newsy
2020		The Washington Post
2021		The Outlaw Ocean Project
2022		The Markup

=== Local Video Storytelling, honoring Jack. R. Howard ===
Formerly known as the Jack R. Howard Award for Television/Cable In-Depth Local Coverage and then (until 2022) Excellence in Broadcast Local Coverage.

Year	Individual Winner(s)	Organization
2015		KNXV-TV, Phoenix
2016	Lee Zurik, Jon Turnipseed, Tom Wright, and Greg Phillips	WVUE-DT, New Orleans
2017	Brendan Keefe	WXIA 11Alive, Atlanta
2018		KNTV, San Jose, California
2019	David Schechter and Chance Horner	WFAA-TV, Dallas
2020		KING-TV, Seattle
2021		KUSA (TV) and KARE (TV)
2022		KUSA (TV), Denver

=== Local/Regional Investigative Reporting ===
In partnership with Google News Lab. From 2015 to 2019, known as the Scripps Howard Award for Community Journalism.

Year	Individual Winner(s)	Organization
2015		The Post and Courier, Charleston, SC
2016	Gregory Pratt	Daily Southtown
2017		Bristol Herald Courier, Virginia
2018		Knoxville News Sentinel, Tennessee
2019	Kyle Hopkins, Loren Holmes, Bill Roth, and Marc Lester	Anchorage Daily News and ProPublica
2020		Tampa Bay Times
2021		Miami Herald
2022	John Archibald, Ashley Remkus, and Ramsey Archibald	AL.com

=== Multimedia Journalism ===
Year	Organization
2017	The Washington Post
2018	Frontline, PBS, and The GroundTruth Project
2019	Vox
2020	The New York Times
2021	Frontline (PBS)
2022	The New York Times

=== National/International Video Storytelling, honoring Jack R. Howard ===
Formerly known as the Jack R. Howard Award for Television/Cable In-Depth National and International Coverage and then (until 2022) Excellence in Broadcast National/International Coverage.

Year	Individual Winner(s)	Organization
2015	Dan Edge	PBS Frontline-WGBH
2016	Vytenis Didziulis, Catalina Gómez Ángel, Mikhail Galustov and Keith Summa	Fusion
2017	Debora Patta, Sarah Carter, and Meshack Dube	CBS News
2018		MSNBC
2019	Abby Ellis, Kayla Ruble, Jacob Carah, and Sarah Childress	Frontline PBS
2020		CBS News
2021		ABC News
2022		Frontline, the Associated Press

=== Narrative Human-Interest Storytelling, honoring Ernie Pyle ===
Formerly known as the Human Interest Writing Ernie Pyle Award and (until 2022) Excellence in Human Interest Storytelling, honoring Ernie Pyle.

Year	Winner	Organization
1953	Jim G. Lucas	Scripps Howard
1954	Eldon Roark	Memphis Press-Scimitar, Tennessee
1955	Andrew F. Tully	Scripps Howard
1956	Gordon S. Thompson	Evansville Press, Indiana
1957	Walter Wingo	Washington Daily News
1958	Don Dedera	The Arizona Republic
1959	Henry J. Taylor	Scripps Howard
1960	James O'Neill Jr.	Washington Daily News
1961	Guy Wright	News-Call Bulletin, San Francisco
1962	Richard Starnes	Scripps Howard
1963	Jack Steele	Scripps Howard
1964	Jim G. Lucas	Scripps Howard
1965	Tom Tiede	Newspaper Enterprise Association
1966	Billy E. Bowles	News & Courier, Charleston, South Carolina
1967	Martin Gershen	Newark Star-Ledger, New Jersey
1967	William Thomas	Memphis Commercial Appeal, Tennessee
1968	Jerry Bledsoe	Greensboro Daily News, North Carolina
1969	Kent Pollock	The Palm Beach Post, Florida
1970	Jerry Bledsoe	Greensboro Daily News, North Carolina
1971	Clettus Atkinson	Birmingham Post-Herald, Alabama
1972	Bill Stokes	The Milwaukee Journal
1973	Jim Wooten	The Philadelphia Inquirer
1974	William D. Montalbano	Miami Herald
1975	Robert Hullihan	The Des Moines Register
1976	Carol LeVarn McCabe	Providence Journal-Bulletin, Rhode Island
1977	Stephen Smith	The Boston Globe
1978	Frank Rossi	Columbia Daily Tribune, Missouri
1979	Bob Morris	The News-Press, Fort Myers, Florida
1980	Richard Ben Kramer	The Philadelphia Inquirer
1981	Mike Royko	Chicago Sun-Times
1982	Linda Wilson	The Daily News, Longview, Washington
1983	Rheta Grimsley Johnson	The Commercial Appeal, Memphis
1984	Bill McClelland	St. Louis Post-Dispatch
1985	Ray Jenkins	Baltimore Evening Sun
1986	Greta Tilley	News & Record, Greensboro, North Carolina
1987	Steve Lopez	The Philadelphia Inquirer
1988	John Kifner	The New York Times
1989	Rose Post	Salisbury Post, North Carolina
1990	Elizabeth Leland	The Charlotte Observer, North Carolina
1991	Chris Hedges	The New York Times
1992	Blaine Harden	The Washington Post
1993	John Woestendiek	The Philadelphia Inquirer
1994	Lisa Pollak	The News & Observer, Raleigh, North Carolina
1995	Christine Bertelson	St. Louis Post-Dispatch
1996	John Lang	Scripps Howard News Service
1997	John Balzar	Los Angeles Times
1998	Gary Pomerantz	The Atlanta Journal-Constitution
1999	Helen O'Neill	Associated Press
2000	Tom Hallman Jr.	The Oregonian, Portland
2001	Ken Fuson	The Des Moines Register
2002	Paula Bock	The Seattle Times
2003	Kelley Benham	St. Petersburg Times, Florida
2004	Davan Maharaj	Los Angeles Times
2005	Brady Dennis	St. Petersburg Times, Florida
2006	Lane DeGregory	St. Petersburg Times, Florida
2007	Julia O'Malley	Anchorage Daily News, Alaska
2008	Sean Kirst	The Post-Standard, Syracuse, New York
2009	Steve Esack	The Morning Call, Allentown, Pa.
2010	Wright Thompson	ESPN.com
2011	Corinne Reilly	The Virginian-Pilot
2012	Michael M. Phillips	The Wall Street Journal
2013	Andrea Elliott	The New York Times
2014	David Abel	The Boston Globe
2015	N. R. Kleinfield	The New York Times
2016	Lane DeGregory	Tampa Bay Times
2017	John Woodrow-Cox	
2018		The New York Times and ProPublica
2019	Eli Saslow	The Washington Post
2020	Stephanie McCrummen	The Washington Post
2021		The Boston Globe
2022		The New York Times Magazine

=== National/International Investigative Reporting, the Ursula and Gilbert Farfel Prize ===
Formerly known as the Investigative Reporting Ursula and Gilbert Farfel Prize.

Year	Winner	Organization
2003		Asbury Park Press/Gannett
2004		Los Angeles Times
2005	Robin Fields, Evelyn Larrubia, Jack Leonard	Los Angeles Times
2006	Charles Forelle, James Bandler, Mark Maremont, Steve Stecklow	The Wall Street Journal
2007	Walt Bogdanich, Jake Hooker	The New York Times
2008		Miami Herald
2009		Philadelphia Daily News
2010		Las Vegas Sun
2011		The New York Times
2012	Spencer S. Hsu	The Washington Post
2013		Milwaukee Journal Sentinel
2014		The Arizona Republic
2015	Aram Roston and Jeremy Singer-Vine	BuzzFeed News
2016		The Atlanta Journal-Constitution
2017		The New York Times
2018		Reuters
2019	Craig Whitlock	The Washington Post
2020		Frontline PBS
2021		International Consortium of Investigative Journalists, The Washington Post
2022		Frontline, the Associated Press

=== Opinion Writing ===
Officially known as the Walker Stone Award for Opinion Writing; formerly known as the Editorial Writing Walker Stone Award.

Year	Winner	Organization
1973	Michael Pakenham	The Philadelphia Inquirer
1974	John R. Harrison	The Lakeland Ledger, Florida
1975	David Bowes	The Cincinnati Post
1976	John R. Harrison	The Lakeland Ledger, Florida
1977	Michael Pakenham	The Philadelphia Inquirer
1978	John Alexander	Greensboro Daily News, North Carolina
1979	Barbara Stanton	Detroit Free Press
1980	Tom Dearmore	San Francisco Examiner
1981	Jay Ambrose	Rocky Mountain News, Denver
1982	Lance W. Dickie	Statesman Journal, Salem, Oregon
1983	Jim Wooten	The Atlanta Journal
1984	Albert (Hap) Cawood	Dayton Daily News, Ohio
1985	Paul Greenberg	Pine Bluff Commercial, Arkansas
1986	Mary Cantwell	The New York Times
1987	Maura J. Casey	The Eagle-Tribune, Massachusetts
1988	Ann Daly Goodwin	St. Paul Pioneer Press Dispatch, Minnesota
1989	Ann Daly Goodwin	St. Paul Pioneer Press Dispatch, Minnesota
1990	Lanny Keller	Shreveport Journal, Louisiana
1991	Maria Henson	Lexington Herald-Leader, Kentucky
1992	Robert Friedman	St. Petersburg Times, Florida
1993	Richard Aregood	Philadelphia Daily News
1994	Jay Bookman	The Atlanta Constitution
1995	Tom Dennis	Times Leader, Wilkes-Barre, Pennsylvania
1996	Michael G. Gartner	The Daily Tribune, Ames, Iowa
1997	Daniel P. Henninger	The Wall Street Journal
1998	David V. Hawpe	The Courier-Journal, Louisville, Kentucky
1999	John C. Bersia	Orlando Sentinel
2000	Debra Decker	The Dallas Morning News
2001	Kate Stanley	Star Tribune, Minneapolis, Minnesota
2002	John Patrick McCormick	Chicago Tribune
2003	Tom Philp	The Sacramento Bee
2004	Randy Bergmann	Asbury Park Press, Neptune, New Jersey
2005	Tony Biffle	Sun Herald, Biloxi, Mississippi
2006	John Diaz, Pati Poblete, and Caille Millner	San Francisco Chronicle
2007	Sonni Efron	Los Angeles Times
2008	David Barham	Arkansas Democrat-Gazette, Little Rock
2009	Robert Greene	Los Angeles Times
2010	Linda Valdez	The Arizona Republic
2011	Jamie Lucke	Lexington Herald-Leader, Kentucky
2012	Tim Nickens	Tampa Bay Times
2013	Tony Messenger and Kevin Horrigan	St. Louis Post-Dispatch
2014	Kathleen Kingsbury	The Boston Globe
2015	Nancy Kaffer	Detroit Free Press
2016	Stephen Henderson	Detroit Free Press
2017	Melinda Henneberger	The Kansas City Star
2018		Palestine Herald-Press, Texas
2019	Kyle Whitmire	Alabama Media Group
2020	Derrick Z. Jackson	Union of Concerned Scientists and Grist.org
2021	Heather Knight	San Francisco Chronicle
2022	Erika D. Smith and Anita Chabria	Los Angeles Times

=== Visual Human-Interest Storytelling ===
"The visual documenting of some of the year’s most complex issues and events." From 1997 to 2016 known as the award for Excellence in Photojournalism, and from 2017 to 2022 as Excellence in Visual Journalism.

Year	Winner	Organization
1997	Martha Rial	Pittsburgh Post-Gazette
1998	Patrick Davison	Rocky Mountain News, Denver, Colorado
1999	George Kochaniec, Jr.	Rocky Mountain News, Denver, Colorado
2000	Marc Andrew Piscotty	Rocky Mountain News, Denver, Colorado
2001	Aristide Economopoulos	The Star-Ledger, Newark, New Jersey
2002	Don Bartletti	Los Angeles Times
2003	Brian Vander Brug	Los Angeles Times
2004	Jim Gehrz	Star Tribune, Minneapolis
2005	Damon Winter	Los Angeles Times
2006	Rick Loomis	Los Angeles Times
2007	Matt McClain	Rocky Mountain News, Denver
2008	Michael Robinzon Chávez	Los Angeles Times
2009	Rodrigo Abd	Associated Press
2010	Lisa Krantz	San Antonio Express-News
2011	Lara Solt	The Dallas Morning News
2012	Lisa Krantz	San Antonio Express-News
2013	John Tlumacki	The Boston Globe
2014	Daniel Berehulak	The New York Times
2015	Carolyn Cole	Los Angeles Times
2016	Daniel Berehulak	The New York Times
2017	Leah Millis	San Francisco Chronicle
2018	Marcus Yam	Los Angeles Times
2019	Rodrigo Abd	Associated Press
2020		Newsday, Long Island, NY
2021		Associated Press
2022		San Francisco Chronicle

=== Impact Award ===
From 2015 to 2019, known as the Topic of the Year Award.

Year	Winner	Organization
2015	Rachel Aviv	The New Yorker
2016	Alec MacGillis	"The Breakdown", ProPublica
2017	Elle Reeve, Tracy Jarrett, Josh Davis, and Joe LoCascio	Vice News
2018		Vice News
2019		NPR and University of Maryland Howard Center for Investigative Journalism
2020		The New York Times Visual Investigations Team
2021		International Consortium of Investigative Journalists, The Washington Post
2022		American Public Media

=== Teacher of the Year ===
Officially known as the Charles E. Scripps Journalism and Mass Communication Teacher of the Year Award; formerly known as the Journalism Teacher of the Year Charles E. Scripps Award. Awarded in partnership with the Association for Education in Journalism and Mass Communication (AEJMC).

Year	Winner	Organization
2003	Debashis "Deb" Aikat	University of North Carolina
2004	Sandra F. Chance	University of Florida
2005	Dr. Louis A. Day	Louisiana State University
2006	Robert Richards	Pennsylvania State University
2007	Elinor Kelley Grusin	University of Memphis
2008	Charles Davis	University of Missouri
2009	Chris Roush	University of North Carolina at Chapel Hill
2010	Joe Saltzman	University of Southern California
2011	Douglas B. Ward	University of Kansas
2012	Jennifer George-Palilonis	Ball State University, Muncie, Ind.
2013	Cindy Royal	Texas State University
2014	Carol Schwalbe	University of Arizona
2015	Carolina Acosta-Alzuru	University of Georgia
2016	Allan Richards	School of Journalism and Mass Communication, Florida International University
2017	Jinx Broussard	Manship School of Mass Communication, Louisiana State University, Baton Rouge
2018	No award given	
2019	Jennifer Thomas	Howard University
2020	Kathleen Bartzen Culver	University of Wisconsin–Madison
2021	Dr. Nicole Smith Dahmen	University of Oregon School of Journalism and Communication
2022	Rachel Young	University of Iowa

=== Administrator of the Year ===
Officially known as the Charles E. Scripps Journalism and Mass Communication Administrator of the Year Award; formerly known as the Journalism Administrator of the Year Charles E. Scripps Award. Awarded in partnership with the Association for Education in Journalism and Mass Communication (AEJMC).

Year	Winner	Organization
2003	John M. Hamilton	Louisiana State University
2004	Will Norton Jr.	University of Nebraska–Lincoln
2005	Thomas Kunkel	University of Maryland
2006	Shirley Staples Carter	University of South Carolina
2007	David M. Rubin	Syracuse University
2008	Marilyn Weaver	Ball State University, Muncie, Indiana
2009	Christopher Callahan	Arizona State University
2010	Paul Parsons	Elon University
2011	John Lavine	Northwestern University
2012	Tim Gleason	University of Oregon
2013	Lori Bergen	Marquette University
2014	Albert R. Tims	University of Minnesota
2015	Michael Bugeja	Iowa State University
2016	Maryanne Reed	Reed College of Media, West Virginia University
2017	No award given	
2018	Diane McFarlin	College of Journalism and Communications, University of Florida, Gainesville
2019	Susan King	University of North Carolina at Chapel Hill
2020	Lucy Dalglish	University of Maryland
2021	David Boardman	Temple University Klein College of Media and Communication
2022	David Kurpius	Missouri School of Journalism

== Discontinued awards and awardees ==
=== College Cartoonist Charles M. Schulz Award ===
In 1997 the Award included a $2,000 prize. In the 2000s, the prize was $10,000.

Year	Winner
1980	Richard Codor
1981	Paul Kolsti
1982	Harley Schwadron
1983	Frank Pauer
1984	Richard Orlin
1985	Thomas Cheney
1986	V. Gene Myers
1987	Michael L. Thompson
1988	Christopher Kalb
1989	Nick Anderson
1990	Kerry Soper
1991	Steve Breen
1992	no award given
1993	John de Rosier
1994	Duk Cho
1995	Drew Sheneman
1996	Jody D. Lindke
1997	Brian Farrington
1998	Audra Ann Furuichi
1999	Ryan Pagelow
2000	Barry Deutsch
2001	Nate Beeler
2002	Steven Olexa
2003	Nathaniel R. Creekmore
2004	Nathaniel R. Creekmore
2005	Russell Gottwaldt
2006	Erin Russell
2007	William Warren
2008	Grant Snider
2009	Christopher Sharron
2010	John Vestevich

=== Commentary ===
Year	Winner	Organization
1997	Donald Kaul	The Des Moines Register
1998	R. Bruce Dold	Chicago Tribune
1999	Susan Anne Nielsen	The Seattle Times
2000	Dennis Roddy	Pittsburgh Post-Gazette
2001	Leonard Pitts	Miami Herald
2002	Frank Cerabino	The Palm Beach Post, Florida
2003	John Kass	Chicago Tribune
2004	Connie Schultz	The Plain Dealer, Cleveland
2005	Steve Lopez	Los Angeles Times
2006	Chris Rose	The Times-Picayune, New Orleans
2007	Jason Whitlock	The Kansas City Star, Missouri
2008	Paul Krugman	The New York Times
2010	Laurie Roberts	The Arizona Republic
2011	Brian McGrory	The Boston Globe
2012	James Carroll	The Boston Globe
2013	Danny Westneat	The Seattle Times
2014	Stephen Henderson	Detroit Free Press

=== Editorial Cartooning ===
Discontinued after 2011.

Year	Winner	Organization
1999	Ed Stein	Rocky Mountain News, Denver
2000	James Casciari	Vero Beach Press Journal
2001	John Sherffius	St. Louis Post-Dispatch
2002	Clay Bennett	The Christian Science Monitor
2003	Walt Handelsman	Newsday, Melville, New York
2004	Steve Sack	Star Tribune, Minneapolis
2005	Michael Ramirez	Los Angeles Times
2006	Stephen Benson	The Arizona Republic
2007	Steve Kelley	The Times-Picayune, New Orleans
2008	Mike Luckovich	The Atlanta Journal-Constitution
2009	Alexander Hunter	The Washington Times
2010	Mike Thompson	Detroit Free Press
2011	Jack Ohman	The Oregonian, Portland

=== Jack R. Howard Broadcast Awards for Public Service Programming — Radio ===
Restructured in 2009.

Year	Market	Organization
1985	Small	WWVA, Wheeling, W. Va.
1985	Large	KMOX, St. Louis
1986	Small	WJYY, Concord, N.H.
1986	Large	KMOX, St. Louis
1987	Small	WWVA, Wheeling, W. Va.
1987	Large	WSM, Nashville, Tenn.
1988	Small	KTAR-AM, Phoenix, Ariz.
1988	Large	No award given
1989	Small	KWTO, Springfield, Mo.
1989	Large	WSM, Nashville, Tenn.
1990	Small	WKSU-FM, Kent, Ohio
1990	Large	WCBS, New York
1991	Small	KNPR-FM, Las Vegas, Nev.
1991	Large	Minnesota Public Radio, St. Paul, Minn.
1992	Small	Barrett Golding, KGLT-FM, Bozeman, Mont.
1992	Large	WHAS-AM, Louisville, Ky.
1993	Small	Samuel Hendren, WUAL-FM, Tuscaloosa, Ala.
1993	Large	KINK FM, Portland, Ore.
1994	Small	KGLT-FM, University of Montana
1994	Large	KGO-AM, San Francisco
1995	Small	WUAL-FM, Tuscaloosa, Ala.
1995	Large	WHAS Radio, Louisville, Ky.
1996	Small	KNAU-FM, Flagstaff, Ariz.
1996	Large	WCBS, New York
1997	Small	Alabama Public Radio, Tuscaloosa
1997	Large	Westwood One-Mutual/ NBC, Arlington, Va.
1998	Small	WAMC, Northeast Public Radio, Albany, NY
1998	Large	WTN Radio, Nashville, Tenn.
1999	Small	High Plains News Service, Billings, Mont.
1999	Large	American RadioWorks/Minnesota Public Radio, St. Paul, Minn.
2000	Small	KCSD-FM, Sioux Falls, S.D.
2000	Large	American RadioWorks/Minnesota Public Radio, St. Paul, Minn.
2001	Small	KOSU-FM, Stillwater, Okla.
2001	Large	Latino USA, National Public Radio, Los Angeles, Calif.
2002	Small	KOSU-FM, Stillwater, Okla.
2002	Large	American RadioWorks/Minnesota Public Radio, St. Paul, Minn.
2003	Small	South Dakota Public Radio, Rapid City
2003	Large	WBEZ, Chicago
2004	—	Chicago Public Radio/WBEZ “This American Life”
2005	—	BBC World Service, Public Radio International and WGBH Boston
2006	—	No award given
2007	—	Alix Spiegel, National Public Radio
2008	—	National Public Radio

=== Jack R. Howard Broadcast Awards for Public Service Programming — Television ===
Became known as Electronic Media — Television/Cable in 1991. Restructured in 2009.

Year	Market	Organization
1985	Small	KGBT-TV, Harlingen, Texas
1985	Large	WCVB-TV, Boston
1986	Small	WBRZ-TV, Baton Rouge, La.
1986	Large	WXFL-TV, Tampa, Fla.
1987	Small	WBRZ-TV, Baton Rouge, La.
1987	Large	KXTV, Sacramento, Calif.
1988	Small	WBRZ-TV, Baton Rouge, La.
1988	Large	WFAA, Dallas
1989	Small	KARK-TV, Little Rock, Ark.
1989	Large	WCBS-TV, New York
1990	Small	KVUE-TV, Austin, Texas
1990	Large	KCNC-TV, Denver
1991	Small	WUFT-TV, Gainesville, Fla.
1991	Large	KCNC-TV, Denver
1992	Small	WTOC-TV, Savannah, Ga.
1992	Large	KSTP-TV, St. Paul, Minn
1993	Small	WBOC-TV, Salisbury, Md., Lynn Giroud
1993	Large	Steve Burgin, WLKY-TV, Louisville, Ky
1994	Small	WBRC-TV, Birmingham, Ala.
1994	Large	KTRK-TV, Houston
1995	Small	KXLY-TV, Spokane, Wa.
1995	Large	WSOC-TV, Charlotte, N.C.
1996	Small	WWSB-TV, Sarasota, Fla.
1996	Large	WCPO-TV, Cincinnati
1997	Small	WANE-TV, Fort Wayne, Ind.
1997	Large	WABC-TV, New York
1998	Small	WANE-TV, Fort Wayne, Ind.
1998	Large	NewsChannel 8, Washington, D.C.
1999	Small	No winner
1999	Large	New England Cable News, Newton, Mass.
2000	Small	WSET-TV, Lynchburg, Va.
2000	Large	KHOU-TV, Houston, Texas
2001	Small	KTUU-TV, Anchorage, Alaska
2001	Large	WFLD-TV, Chicago, Ill.
2002	Small	KEYE-TV, Austin, Texas
2002	Large	KHOU-TV, Houston
2003	Small	KTUU-TV, Anchorage, Alaska
2003	Large	WCNC-TV, Charlotte
2004	—	CNBC, Englewood Cliffs, N.J.
2005	—	WCCO-TV, Minneapolis
2006	—	WTHR-TV, Indianapolis
2007	—	WJLA-TV, Arlington, Va.
2008	—	Downtown Community Television Center, New York

=== Literacy Charles E. Scripps Awards ===
Originally separated into Broadcast and Newspaper divisions.

Year	Division	Winner, Organization
1986	Broadcast	WXYZ-TV, Detroit
1986	Newspaper	El Paso Herald-Post, Texas
1987	Broadcast	New Jersey Network
1987	Newspaper	Lexington Herald-Leader, Kentucky
1988	Broadcast	KOCO-TV, Oklahoma City
1988	Newspaper	Lesher Communications
1989	Broadcast	WFSB-TV, Hartford, Connecticut
1989	Newspaper	San Antonio Light, Texas
1990	Broadcast	No winner selected
1990	Newspaper	Knoxville News Sentinel, Tennessee
1991	Broadcast	WGHP-TV, High Point, North Carolina
1991	Newspaper	The Daily Reflector, Greenville, North Carolina
1992	Broadcast	Bud Wilkinson, KTSP-TV, Phoenix, Arizona
1992	Newspaper	Anderson Independent-Mail, South Carolina
1993	Broadcast	No winner selected
1993	Newspaper	Columbus Ledger-Enquirer, Georgia
1994	Broadcast	WDEF-TV, Chattanooga, Tennessee
1994	Newspaper	Naples Daily News, Florida
1995	Broadcast	WDEF-TV, Chattanooga, Tennessee
1995	Newspaper	The Blade, Toledo, Ohio
1996	Broadcast	WTHR-TV, Indianapolis
1996	Newspaper	The Gaston Gazette, North Carolina

Reorganized in 1997 to honor an individual and an organization (not necessarily related).

Year	Individual winner	Winning org.
1997	Betty J. Frey (Tucson, Arizona)	Knoxville News Sentinel, Tennessee
1998	Betty Williford (Elberton, Georgia)	The Baltimore Sun
1999	Sonia Gutierrez (Washington, DC)	Naples Daily News, Florida
2000		The Bakersfield Californian
2001	Paul Riede	The Post-Standard, Syracuse, New York
2002		Orlando Sentinel
2003	Rochelle Riley	Detroit Free Press

=== Public Service Reporting Roy W. Howard Award ===
Originally divided into a newspaper division and a broadcast division.

Year	Division	Winner/Organization
1972	Newspaper	St. Louis Globe-Democrat
1972	Broadcast	WABC-TV, New York
1973	Newspaper	William Blundell, The Wall Street Journal
1973	Broadcast	KGW-TV, Portland, Ore.
1974	Newspaper	Milwaukee Journal
1974	Broadcast	WABC-TV, New York
1975	Newspaper	Louisville (Ky.) Courier-Journal
1975	Broadcast	KGW-TV, Portland, Ore.
1976	Newspaper	San Francisco Examiner
1976	Broadcast	KMOX-TV, St. Louis
1977	Newspaper	The Philadelphia Inquirer
1977	Broadcast	KOY-Radio, Phoenix, Ariz.
1978	Newspaper	The Philadelphia Inquirer
1978	Broadcast	WBBM-TV, Chicago
1979	Newspaper	Deseret News, Salt Lake City, Utah
1979	Broadcast	KOCO-TV, Oklahoma City
1980	Newspaper	The Charlotte Observer, N.C.
1980	Broadcast	KTMC-AM, McAlester, Okla.
1981	Newspaper	The Seattle Times
1981	Broadcast	WTHR-TV, Indianapolis
1982	Newspaper	The Clarion-Ledger, Jackson, Miss.
1982	Broadcast	WTSP-TV, St. Petersburg, Fla.
1983	Newspaper	Dan Biddle, The Philadelphia Inquirer
1983	Broadcast	WBRZ-TV, Baton Rouge, La.
1984	Newspaper	Hartford Courant, Conn.
1984	Broadcast	KOMO-TV, Seattle
1985	—	The Philadelphia Inquirer

Restructured to recognize newspapers only, and divided into two categories — under 100,000 and over 100,000 circulation.

Year	Circulation	Winner/Organization
1986	Under 100,000	The Lakeland Ledger, Fla.
1986	Over 100,000	The Pittsburgh Press
1987	Under 100,000	The Albuquerque Tribune, N.M.; Boulder Daily Camera, Colo.
1987	Over 100,000	The Charlotte Observer, N.C.
1988	Under 100,000	Anchorage Daily News, Alaska
1988	Over 100,000	The Philadelphia Inquirer
1989	Under 100,000	Charleston Gazette, W. Va.
1989	Over 100,000	Fort Worth Star-Telegram, Texas
1990	Under 100,000	The Tucson Citizen, Ariz.
1990	Over 100,000	The Boston Globe
1991	Under 100,000	The Republican-American, Waterbury, Conn.
1991	Over 100,000	New York Newsday
1992	Under 100,000	The Albuquerque Tribune, N.M.
1992	Over 100,000	Seth Rosenfeld, San Francisco Examiner
1993	Under 100,000	The Albuquerque Tribune, N.M.
1993	Over 100,000	Chicago Tribune
1994	Under 100,000	The Virgin Islands Daily News
1994	Over 100,000	New York Newsday
1995	Under 100,000	Ken Ward Jr., The Charleston Gazette, West VA.
1995	Over 100,000	The Orange County Register, Calif
1996	Under 100,000	Maureen Magee, Ventura County Star, Calif
1996	Over 100,000	Alison Young, Detroit Free Press
1997	Under 100,000	Pensacola News Journal, Fla.
1997	Over 100,000	Asbury Park Press, Neptune, N.J.
1998	Under 100,000	The Charleston Gazette, W. Va.
1998	Over 100,000	The Philadelphia Inquirer
1999	Under 100,000	Colorado Daily, Boulder, Colo.
1999	Over 100,000	Chicago Tribune
2000	Under 100,000	Chronicle-Tribune, Marion, Ind.
2000	Over 100,000	The Detroit News
2001	Under 100,000	York Daily Record, Pa.; The York Dispatch/Sunday News, Pa.
2001	Over 100,000	The Seattle Times, Wash.
2002	Under 100,000	The Albuquerque Tribune
2002	Over 100,000	The Baltimore Sun
2003	Under 100,000	Argus Leader, Sioux Falls, S.D.
2003	Over 100,000	The Seattle Times

Circulation divisions eliminated; award discontinued after 2016.

Year	Winner/Organization
2004	Hartford Courant, Conn.
2005	South Florida Sun-Sentinel, Fort Lauderdale
2006	Bloomberg News
2007	Chicago Tribune
2008	Las Vegas Sun
2009	Meg Kissinger and Susanne Rust, Milwaukee Journal Sentinel
2010	Los Angeles Times
2011	California Watch and The Center for Investigative Reporting
2012	Patricia Callahan, Sam Roe, and Michael Hawthorne; Chicago Tribune
2013	Guardian US
2014	The New York Times
2015	Tom Vanden Brook et al., USA Today Network
2016	Houston Chronicle

=== Washington Reporting Raymond Clapper Award ===
Reporter and Scripps Howard columnist Raymond Clapper died in 1944 during World War II while covering the U.S. invasion of the Marshall Islands. Following his death, the Raymond Clapper Memorial Association was incorporated on March 10, 1944, in Washington, D.C. "to perpetuate the memory of Clapper" through the Raymond Clapper Memorial Award, which was presented annually "to a journalist or team for distinguished Washington reporting." The White House Correspondents' Association, and sometimes the American Society of Newspaper Editors, distributed the Raymond Clapper Award from 1944 to 2003, at which point it passed to the National Journalism Awards. Under Scripps Howard, the Washington Reporting Raymond Clapper Award was presented from 2004 to 2011, at which point it was discontinued.

Year	Winner	Organization
2004	Greg Jaffe	The Wall Street Journal
2005	Chris Adams and Alison Young	Knight Ridder Washington Bureau
2006	Wes Allison	St. Petersburg Times, Florida
2007	Marisa Taylor, Margaret Talev, and Greg Gordon	McClatchy Washington Bureau
2008	David Willman	Los Angeles Times
2009	Thomas Frank	USA Today
2010	Adam Liptak	The New York Times
2011	Damian Paletta	The Wall Street Journal

=== Web Reporting ===
Discontinued after 2008.

Year	Winner	Organization
1999	APBnews.com	Asia-Pacific Broadcasting
2000	MTVi News	MTV
2001	USAToday.com	USA Today
2002	The Sun	The San Bernardino Sun, San Bernardino, California
2003	Times Union	Times Union, Albany, N.Y.
2004	DallasNews.com	The Dallas Morning News
2005	roanoke.com	The Roanoke Times, Virginia
2006	washingtonpost.com	The Washington Post
2007	washingtonpost.com	The Washington Post
2008	Los Angeles Times	Los Angeles Times
