= Drew Sheneman =

American editorial cartoonist

Drew Sheneman (born c. 1975) is an American editorial cartoonist. His work, which has appeared in The Star-Ledger of Newark, New Jersey, since 1998, is nationally syndicated by Tribune Content Agency.

== Biography ==
Sheneman was raised in New Jersey, but he attended college at Central Michigan University, where he began cartooning for the college's newspaper, Central Michigan Life. While he was in college, he interned at The Detroit News and The Oakland Press. During his college years, he was recognized by the Scripps Howard Foundation, which gave him a National Journalism Award (the College Cartoonist Charles M. Schulz Award) and stated, "What we have in Drew Sheneman is a thoroughly professional cartoonist ready to move directly to a metropolitan newspaper and perform his stint on the editorial page." In 1998, Sheneman graduated from CMU with an art degree.

Upon his graduation from college, Sheneman was hired by The Star Ledger, becoming the youngest full-time editorial cartoonist in the United States at the age of 23. His cartoons, which are syndicated nationally by TMS, have also appeared in The New York Times, the Los Angeles Times, and The Washington Post, among others. Sheneman joined many other cartoonists at the 2004 Republican National Convention and 2004 Democratic National Convention, traveling to New York City and Boston, respectively, to cover the proceedings. He has not visited any such conventions since then.

"Cowboy," a 2003 editorial cartoon Sheneman published fifteen days before the United States invaded Iraq, won him the Vic Cantone Editorial Cartoon Award from the New York City chapter of the Society of Professional Journalists.

Sheneman lives in Bedminster Township, New Jersey with his family.

== Awards ==
Sheneman has won several awards for his editorial cartooning:

- 2004 Vic Cantone Editorial Cartoon Award – from the New York chapter of the Society of Professional Journalists; a Deadline Club Award given annually to a New York-area editorial cartoonist
- 1996 College Cartoonist Charles M. Schulz Award – from the Scripps Howard Foundation; a National Journalism Award given annually to a college cartoonist
- 1995 John Locher Memorial Award – from the Association of American Editorial Cartoonists; given annually to a college cartoonist
