= Tampa Bay Times =

Daily newspaper in Florida, US

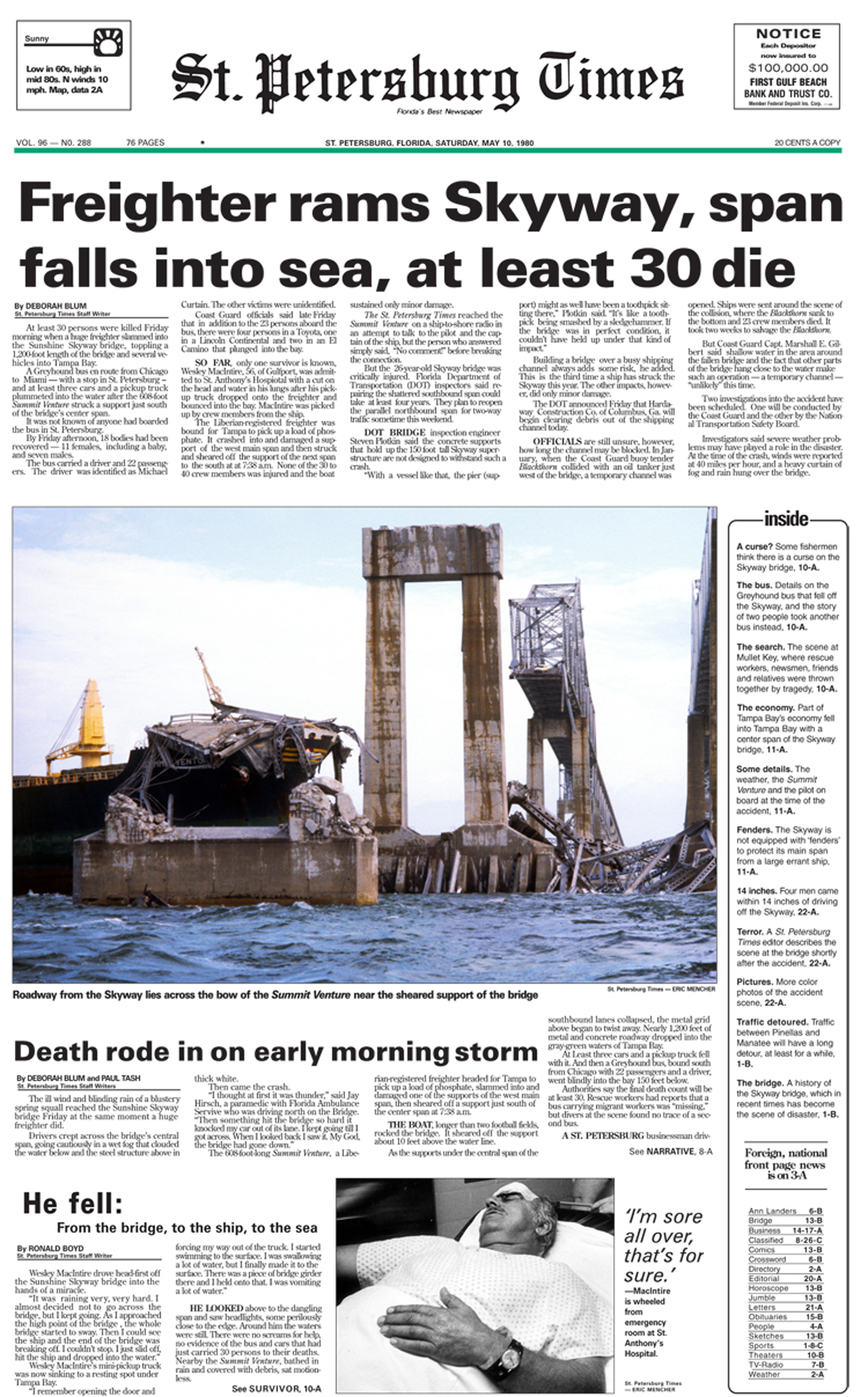
- Front page of the St. Petersburg Times from May 10, 1980, covering the Sunshine Skyway Bridge disaster
- Type: Daily newspaper
- Format: Broadsheet
- Owner: Times Publishing Company
- Founded: 1884; 142 years ago
- Language: English
- Headquarters: 490 First Avenue South; St. Petersburg, Florida 33701; United States
- Circulation: 42,200 Average print circulation 30,000 Digital Subscribers
- ISSN: 2327-9052 (print); 2641-4643 (web)
- OCLC number: 5920090
- Website: tampabay.com

The Tampa Bay Times, called the St. Petersburg Times until 2011, is an American newspaper published in St. Petersburg, Florida, United States. It is published by the Times Publishing Company, which is owned by the Poynter Institute for Media Studies, a nonprofit journalism school directly adjacent to the University of South Florida St. Petersburg campus.

It has won fourteen Pulitzer Prizes since 1964, and in 2009, won two in a single year for the first time in its history, one of which was for its PolitiFact project.

== History ==
Logo of the St. Petersburg Times in 2009

The newspaper traces its origin to the West Hillsborough Times, a weekly newspaper established in Dunedin, Florida, on the Pinellas Peninsula in 1884. At the time, neither St. Petersburg nor Pinellas County existed; the peninsula was part of Hillsborough County. The paper was published weekly in the back of a pharmacy and had a circulation of 480. It subsequently changed ownership six times in seventeen years. In December 1884, it was bought by A. C. Turner, who moved it to Clear Water Harbor (modern Clearwater, Florida). In 1892, it moved to St. Petersburg, and by 1898 it was officially renamed the St. Petersburg Times.

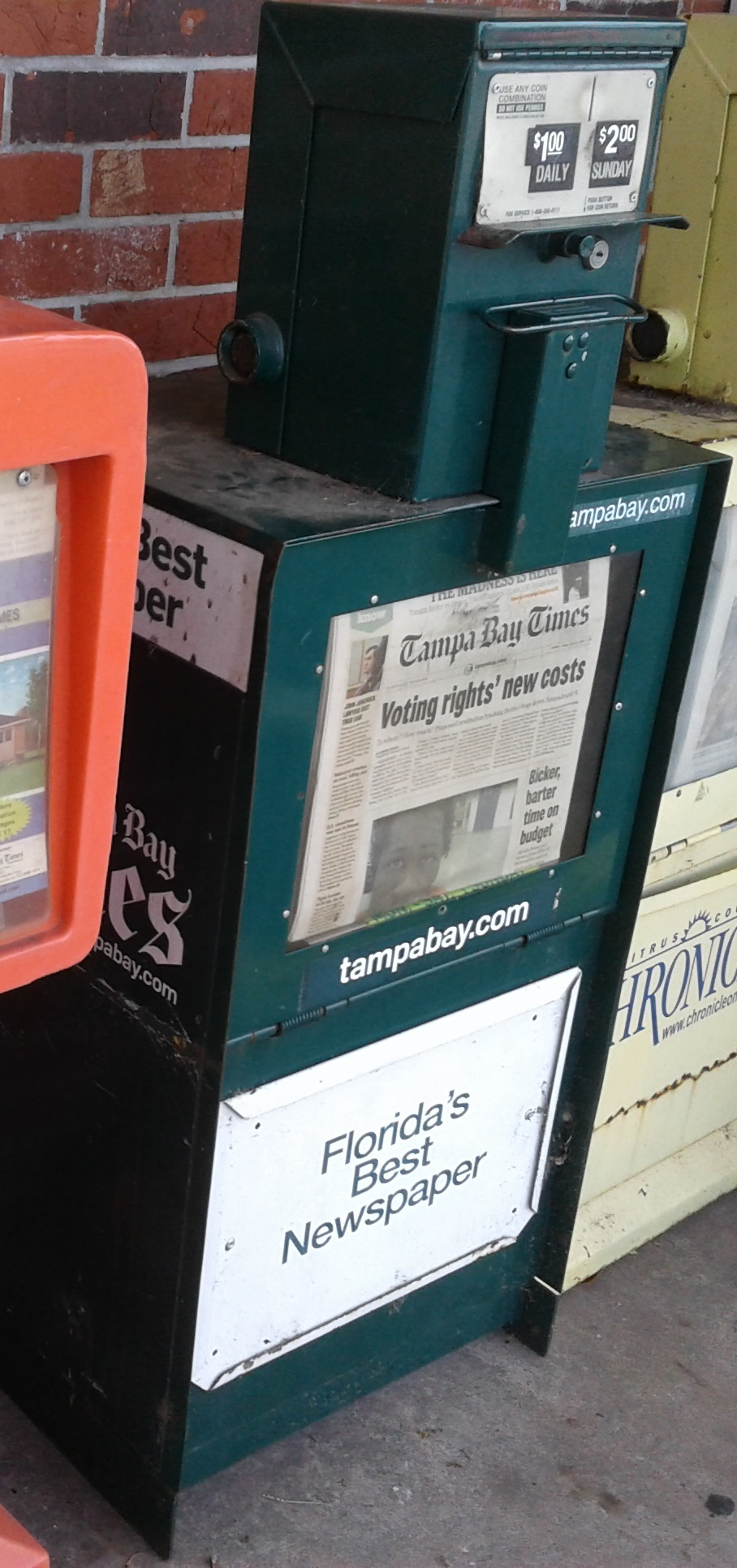
Tampa Bay Times newspaper rack

The Times became bi-weekly in 1907, and began publication six days a week in 1912. Paul Poynter, a publisher originally from Indiana, bought the paper in September 1912 and converted to a seven-day paper, though it was rarely financially stable. Paul's son, Nelson Poynter, became editor in 1939 and took majority control of the paper in 1947, and set about improving the paper's finances and prestige. Nelson Poynter controlled the paper until his death in 1978, when he willed the majority of the stock to the non-profit Poynter Institute. In November 1986, the Evening Independent was merged into the Times. Poynter was succeeded as editor by Eugene Patterson (1978–1988), Andrew Barnes (1988–2004), Paul Tash (2004–2010; chair of the Times Publishing Company since 2004 and the Poynter Institute since 2007) Neil Brown (2010–2017), and Mark Katches (2018–present).

On January 1, 2012, the St. Petersburg Times was renamed the Tampa Bay Times; this stemmed from a 2006 decision of a lawsuit with Media General, at the time the publishers of the Times' competing newspaper, The Tampa Tribune, which allowed that paper to keep its exclusive right to use the name of its defunct sister paper, The Tampa Times, for five years after the decision.

As the newly rechristened Tampa Bay Times, the paper's weekday tabloid tbt*, a free daily publication and which used "(* Tampa Bay Times)" as its subtitle, became just tbt when the name change took place. The St. Pete Times name lives on as the name for the Times' neighborhood news sections in southern Pinellas County (formerly Neighborhood Times), serving communities from Largo southward.

Logo of the free tabloid tbt* in 2018

Logo of the free tabloid tbt* in 2009

The Times has also done significant investigative reporting on the Church of Scientology, since the church's acquisition of the Fort Harrison Hotel in 1975 and other holdings in Clearwater. The Times has published special reports and series critical of the church and its current leader, David Miscavige.

In 2010, the Times published an investigative report questioning the validity of the United States Navy Veterans Association, leading to significant reaction and official investigations into the group nationwide.

On May 3, 2016, the Times acquired its longtime competitor The Tampa Tribune, with the latter publication immediately ceasing publishing and Tribune features and some writers expected to be merged into the Times. As reported by other local media outlets in the Tampa Bay area at the time of this acquisition, for many years the Tampa Tribune was considered to be the more conservative newspaper in the region, while the Tampa Bay Times was thought of as more liberal.

The Times' purchase of the Tribune also allowed its circulation area to be expanded into Polk County, placing it in competition with other newspapers such as The Lakeland Ledger and The Polk County Democrat, as well as into the south central region of the state known as the Florida Heartland. In the case of the latter, the Times published Highlands Today, which was a daily news supplement of The Tribune for readers in Highlands County. The Times sold the paper in 2016 to Sun Coast Media Group.

In October 2019, the paper laid off seven newsroom employees.

The Times received $8.5 million in federal loans from the Paycheck Protection Program by July 2020 during the COVID-19 pandemic. By this point, they had reduced delivery to two days per week. They had also cut 11 journalists' jobs through layoffs expected before the pandemic.

In August 2024, the paper announced it will eliminate 60 jobs, amounting to 20% of total staff.

On October 9–10, 2024, the Tampa Bay Times building was severely damaged during Hurricane Milton by a nearby construction crane that collapsed onto the building.

== PolitiFact.com ==
The newspaper created PolitiFact.com, a project in which its reporters and editors "fact-check statements by members of Congress, the White House, lobbyists and interest groups…" They publish original statements and their evaluations on the PolitiFact.com website and assign each a "Truth-O-Meter" rating, with ratings ranging from "True" for completely true statements to "Pants on Fire" (from the taunt "Liar, liar, pants on fire") for false and ridiculous statements. The site also includes an "Obameter", tracking U.S. President Barack Obama's performance with regard to his campaign promises. PolitiFact.com was awarded the Pulitzer Prize for National Reporting in 2009 for "its fact-checking initiative during the 2008 presidential campaign that used probing reporters and the power of the World Wide Web to examine more than 750 political claims, separating rhetoric from truth to enlighten voters." The Times sold PolitiFact.com to its parent company, the Poynter Institute, in 2018.

== Awards and nominations ==
Year	Award	Work	Recipients	Category	Result
2022	Pulitzer Prize	For a compelling exposé of highly toxic hazards inside Florida’s only battery recycling plant that forced the implementation of safety measures to adequately protect workers and nearby residents.	Corey G. Johnson, Rebecca Woolington and Eli Murray	Investigative Reporting	Won
2021	Pulitzer Prize	For resourceful, creative reporting that exposed how a powerful and politically connected sheriff built a secretive intelligence operation that harassed residents and used grades and child welfare records to profile schoolchildren.	Kathleen McGrory and Neil Bedi	Local Reporting	Won
2019	Pulitzer Prize	For impactful reporting, based on sophisticated data analysis, that revealed an alarming rate of patient fatalities following Johns Hopkins' takeover of a pediatric heart treatment facility.	Kathleen McGrory and Neil Bedi	Investigative Reporting	Finalist
2016	Pulitzer Prize	"For exposing a local school board's culpability in turning some county schools into failure factories, with tragic consequences for the community. (Moved by the Board from the Public Service category, where it was also entered.)"	Michael LaForgia, Cara Fitzpatrick and Lisa Gartner	Local Reporting	Won
2016	Pulitzer Prize	"For a stellar example of collaborative reporting by two news organizations that revealed escalating violence and neglect in Florida mental hospitals and laid the blame at the door of state officials."	Leonora LaPeter Anton and Anthony Cormier of the Tampa Bay Times and Michael Braga of the Sarasota Herald-Tribune	Investigative Reporting	Won
2014	Pulitzer Prize	"For relentlessly investigating the squalid conditions that marked housing for Hillsborough County's substantial homeless population, leading to swift reforms."	Will Hobson and Michael LaForgia	Local Reporting	Won
2013	Pulitzer Prize	"For helping reverse the decision to end fluoridation of water in Pinellas County."	Tim Nickens and Daniel Ruth	Editorial Writing	Won
2012	Pulitzer Prize		Tim Nickens, Joni James, John Hill and Robyn Blumner	Editorial Writing	Finalist
2010	National Headliner Awards	"Inside Scientology"	Thomas C. Tobin and Joe Childs	Investigative reporting	Finalist
2010	Florida Society of News Editors	"Inside Scientology"	Thomas C. Tobin and Joe Childs	Gold Medal for Public Service	Won
2010	Pulitzer Prize	"For Their Own Good"	Ben Montgomery, Waveney Ann Moore, and photographer Edmund D. Fountain	Local Reporting	Finalist
2009	Pulitzer Prize	PolitiFact.com	Times staff, represented by Bill Adair, Washington bureau chief	National Reporting	Won
2009	Pulitzer Prize	PolitiFact.com	Times staff, represented by Bill Adair, Washington bureau chief	Public Service	Finalist
2009	Pulitzer Prize	"The Girl in the Window"	Lane DeGregory	Feature Writing	Won
2009	Pulitzer Prize	"Winter's Tale"	John Barry	Feature Writing	Finalist
2007	Scripps Howard Foundation	Human Interest Writing	Lane DeGregory	Ernie Pyle Award	Won
2007	Scripps Howard Foundation	"A Republican vs. Republican Cellular Division"	Wes Allison	Raymond Clapper Award	Won
2007	Pulitzer Prize	"In His Own Defense"	Christopher Goffard	Feature Writing	Finalist
2003	Scripps Howard Foundation	Human Interest Writing	Kelley Benham	Ernie Pyle Award	Won
2002	Scripps Howard Foundation	"The Poison in Your Back Yard"	Julie Hauserman	Edward J. Meeman Award	Won
2000	Pulitzer Prize	"Una Vida Mejor"	Anne Hull	Feature Writing	Finalist
2000	Pulitzer Prize	"Una Vida Mejor"	Anne Hull	National Reporting	Finalist
1999	Sigma Delta Chi	"Deadly Rampage"	Times staff	Excellence in deadline reporting	Won
1999	Sigma Delta Chi	Investigative report of U.S. Rep. Corrine Brown	Bill Adair and David Dahl	Washington correspondence	Won
1998	Pulitzer Prize	"Angels & Demons"	Thomas French	Feature Writing	Won
1998	Pulitzer Prize	Investigative report of The Rev. Henry Lyons	Times staff	Investigative Reporting	Finalist
1998	Pulitzer Prize	The "Tobacco" series	David Barstow	Explanatory Reporting	Finalist
1997	Pulitzer Prize	Coverage of the 1996 St. Petersburg riot	Times staff	Spot News Reporting	Finalist
1995	Pulitzer Prize	"Final Indignities"	Jeffrey Good	Editorial Writing	Won
1995	Pulitzer Prize	"A Secret Life"	Anne Hull	Feature Writing	Finalist
1992	Pulitzer Prize	"Life From Death"	Sheryl James	Feature Writing	Finalist
1991	Pulitzer Prize	"A Gift Abandoned"	Sheryl James	Feature Writing	Won
1985	Pulitzer Prize	Corruption in Pasco County Sheriff's Office	Lucy Morgan and Jack Reed	Investigative Reporting	Won
1982	Pulitzer Prize	Coverage of drug smuggling in Dixie County, Florida	Lucy Morgan	Local General or Spot News Reporting	Finalist
1980	Pulitzer Prize	Investigation of Church of Scientology operations in Florida	Bette Swenson Orsini and Charles Stafford	National Reporting	Won
1980	Pulitzer Prize	Investigation of Church of Scientology operations in Florida	Times staff	Public Service	Finalist
1969	Penney-Missouri Award	Women's section	Marjorie Paxson	General Excellence	Won
1964	Pulitzer Prize	Investigation of Florida Turnpike Authority	Martin Waldron and Times staff	Meritorious Public Service	Won

== See also ==
- List of newspapers in Florida
- Media in the Tampa Bay Area
