= Edward J. Meeman =

American journalist and editor

- Born: October 2, 1889; Evansville, Indiana
- Died: November 15, 1966 (aged 77); Memphis, Tennessee
- Occupations: Journalist and editor
- Known for: Environmental and anti-corruption causes

Edward John Meeman (October 2, 1889 – November 15, 1966) was an American journalist and editor.

== Biography ==
Meeman was born in Evansville, Indiana. He served in the U.S. Navy during World War I, and upon returning went to work for the Evansville Press, first as a reporter and then as an editor. In 1921 he became editor of the Knoxville News daily paper, later known as the News-Sentinel, and then just Sentinel, and ten years later edited the Memphis Press-Scimitar. During his career he championed causes such as civil rights and environmental conservation, and fought to expose political corruption. He was nominated for a Pulitzer Prize in 1946.

After his retirement from the Press-Scimitar in 1962, Meeman served "as conservation editor of all Scripps-Howard newspapers ... until his death" on November 15, 1966, at age 77. Subsequently, Scripps Howard created the Edward J. Meeman Foundation to support journalism and conservation through grants and awards. The Edward J. Meeman Environmental Reporting Award has been given to various journalists since 1967, including Ken Ward Jr., Sam Roe, Bruce Ingersoll, James V. Risser, Larry Tye, and Craig Flournoy. (The award is now titled "Excellence in Environmental Reporting, honoring Edward W. 'Ted' Scripps II.")

The Meeman Museum and Nature Center in the Meeman-Shelby Forest State Park in Tennessee is named after him. In addition, the Department of Journalism and Strategic Media at the University of Memphis is housed in the Meeman Journalism Building, named in his honor thanks to a gift from his foundation.

His autobiography, The Editorial We: a Posthumous Autobiography, was published after his death.
