= Jack R. Howard =

American journalist

Jack Rohe Howard (August 31, 1910 – March 22, 1998) was an American broadcasting executive. He was president of the E. W. Scripps Company from 1953 to 1976.

Born in Manhattan, the son of Roy W. Howard, a founder of United Press International, he attended Phillips Exeter Academy and in 1932 graduated from Yale. After several years in newspaper journalism, including reporting from Japan and Manchuria, Howard moved into broadcasting and chaired Scripps Howard's broadcasting division from 1937 until his retirement in 1976. He talked his father, then head of Scripps-Howard newspapers, out of closing Denver's Rocky Mountain News in 1940 and, while serving with the US Navy in World War II, he participated in the landings at Leyte and Lingayen Gulf in the Philippines.

According to The New York Times, "His career was marked by his determination to set his own course and to bring the company his father helped establish into the fledgling field of broadcasting." The Scripps-Howard broadcasting division grew from two radio stations to six television stations and three radio stations under his leadership.

The Scripps-owned NBC station KTEW-TV in Tulsa, Oklahoma changed its call letters in honor of Howard on July 14, 1980, to KJRH-TV.

Howard helped found the Scripps Howard Foundation in 1962 and served as its president for its first five years. He was president of the Inter American Press Association (SIP/IAPA) in 1965–1966.

After his death on March 22, 1998, he left the Scripps Howard Foundation a bequest of more than $7 million.

A number of awards presented during the National Journalism Awards/Scripps Howard Awards are named in honor of Howard, including Excellence in Audio Storytelling (est. 2009) and Excellence in both Local and National/International Video Storytelling (both est. 2015).
