= Mary Cantwell =

American journalist and novelist

- Born: May 10, 1930; Providence, Rhode Island, U.S.
- Died: February 1, 2000 (aged 69); Manhattan, New York, U.S.
- Education: Connecticut College (BA)
- Occupations: Journalist; novelist

Mary Cantwell (May 10, 1930 – February 1, 2000) was an American journalist and novelist. Cantwell served as a member of the New York Times editorial board for sixteen years. She wrote unsigned editorials, novels, and commentary for that newspaper, and she also wrote for Mademoiselle and Vogue during her career. Cantwell composed a trilogy of memoirs later in her life.

Cantwell died on February 1, 2000, in Manhattan, New York. She was 69.

== Life ==
Mary Cantwell was born in Providence, Rhode Island, on May 10, 1930 to Leo and Mary Cantwell. She had a younger sister, Diana. She grew up in Bristol, Rhode Island, in a largely Protestant neighborhood. Cantwell was brought up Catholic and was singled out in her largely Protestant school. Cantwell graduated from Colt Memorial High School in 1949.

Cantwell earned her B.A. from Connecticut College in 1953 and married her husband in December of that year. The couple had two daughters. They would later divorce.

== Career ==
Cantwell worked as a copywriter at Mademoiselle Magazine until 1958. Between 1958 and 1959, she worked as a feature writer for Vogue. Cantwell returned to Mademoiselle in 1962 and was promoted to chief copywriter.

Cantwell's work at the New York Times began in 1980 and included editorials and essays. While at the Times, she wrote a regular column entitled Hers. Cantwell was awarded the Connecticut College Medal in 1983. She also received the Walker Stone Award from the Scripps Howard Foundation in 1986.

Cantwell also published three personal memoirs during the 1990s. (See selected bibliography below.)

== Selected bibliography ==
- American Girl: Scenes from a Small Town Childhood (1992)
- Manhattan, When I Was Young (1995)
- Speaking With Strangers: A Memoir (1998)
- Manhattan Memoir (2000, compilation of former works)

== Sources ==
- Cantwell, Mary Lee. "The Scribner Encyclopedia of American Lives." Ed. Kenneth T. Jackson, Karen Markoe, and Arnold Markoe. Vol. 6: 2000-2002. New York: Charles Scribner's Sons, 2004. Reproduced in Biography Resource Center. Farmington Hills, Mich.: Gale, 2009. http://galenet.galegroup.com/servlet/BioRC
