= David Schechter =

American journalist (born 1971)

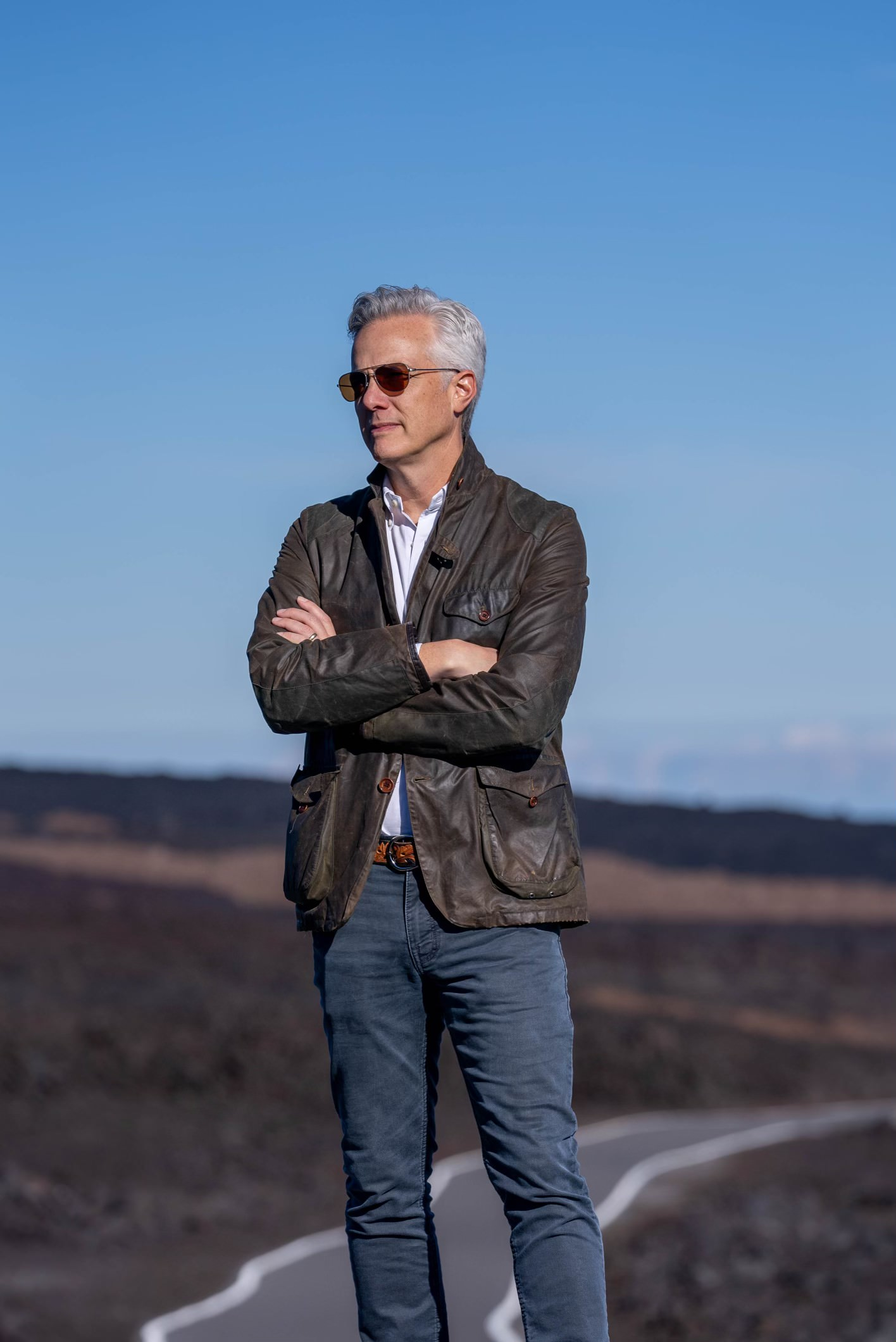
- Schechter in Mauna Loa, Hawaii (2022)
- Born: February 16, 1971 (age 55); Detroit, Michigan, U.S.
- Education: University of Michigan (BA)
- Occupation: Journalist
- Employer: CBS News
- Known for: Environmental journalism
- Honours: Alfred I. duPont–Columbia University Award

David Merrill Schechter (born February 16, 1971) is an American broadcast journalist and environmental journalist. He is known for work that emphasizes human impact in complex issues — particularly climate change and environmental science. Schechter is best known as the creator and host of Verify Road Trip, a documentary style program that took viewers on the road to examine public issues for themselves. Schechter was the CBS News National Environmental Correspondent until mid-2026.

Over his career, Schechter worked as a local news reporter in Dallas, Minneapolis, Dubuque, Youngstown, and Kansas City before transitioning to CBS in 2022. Schechter has won multiple national awards, among them an Alfred duPont-Columbia University Award, multiple Edward R. Murrow Awards, two Scripps Howard Awards, and the Walter Cronkite Award for Excellence in Political Reporting.

== Early life and education ==
David Schechter was born into a Jewish family in West Bloomfield, Michigan. His parents owned and operated Camp Walden, a children's summer camp in northern Michigan for much of Schechter's life. Schechter attended West Bloomfield High School.

In 1989, while still in high school, Schechter won a Columbia Scholastic Press Gold Circle Award for a sports feature about CBS newscaster Pat O'Brien, called "At The Half: A Behind the Scenes Look at Pat O'Brien." The piece went on to be featured in the Detroit Pistons in-house magazine as well as the NBA league magazine, Hoop.

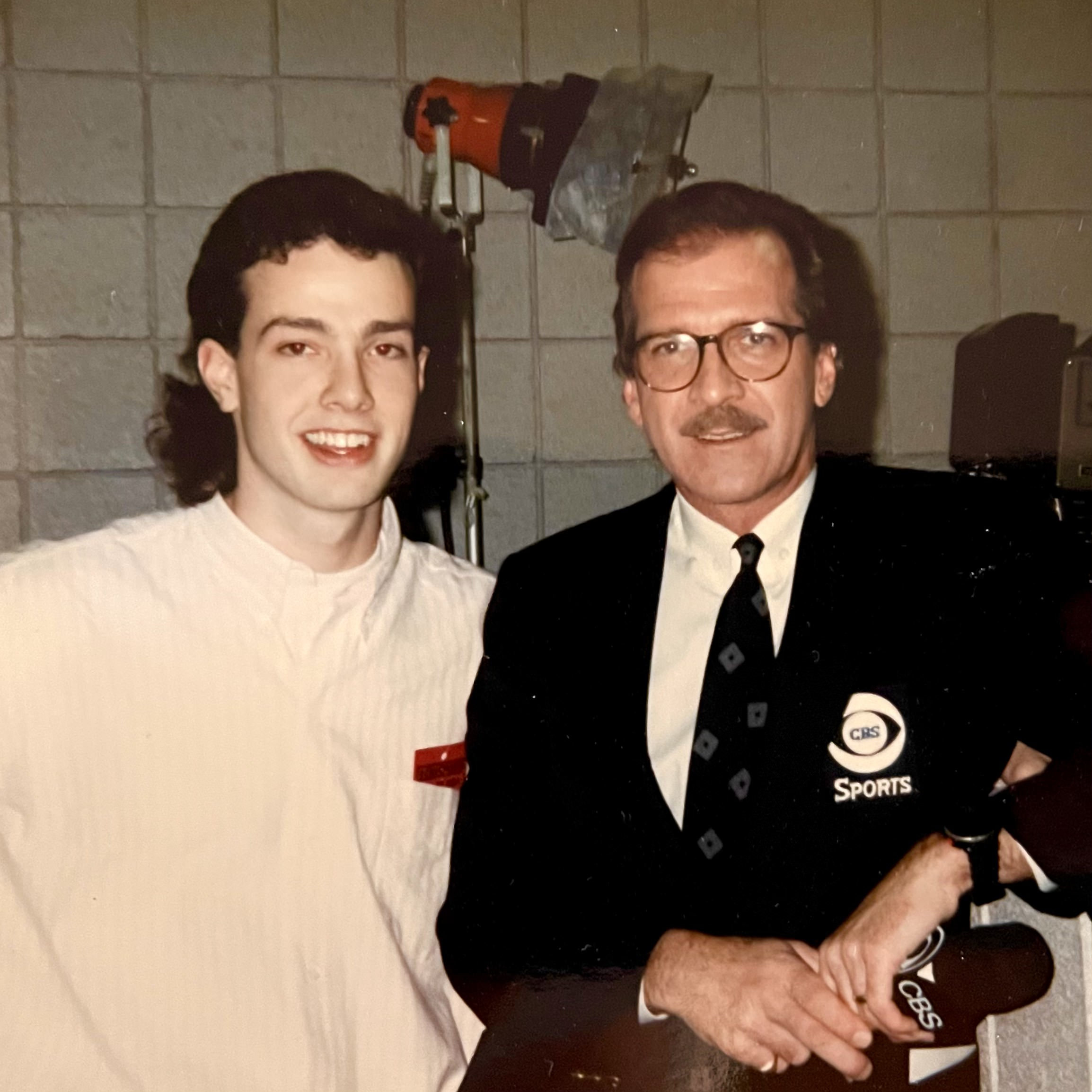
Schechter and O'Brien in the early 1990s

Schechter attended the University of Michigan, where he was a member of Zeta Beta Tau fraternity and worked as a sports reporter for the Michigan Daily student newspaper. In 1993 he graduated with a Bachelors Degree in Communication.

== Career ==
=== Local news (1993–2022) ===
Immediately after college, Schechter started his career in Dubuque, Iowa in 1993 as a Primary Anchor at KDUB-TV, a now-closed local television station.

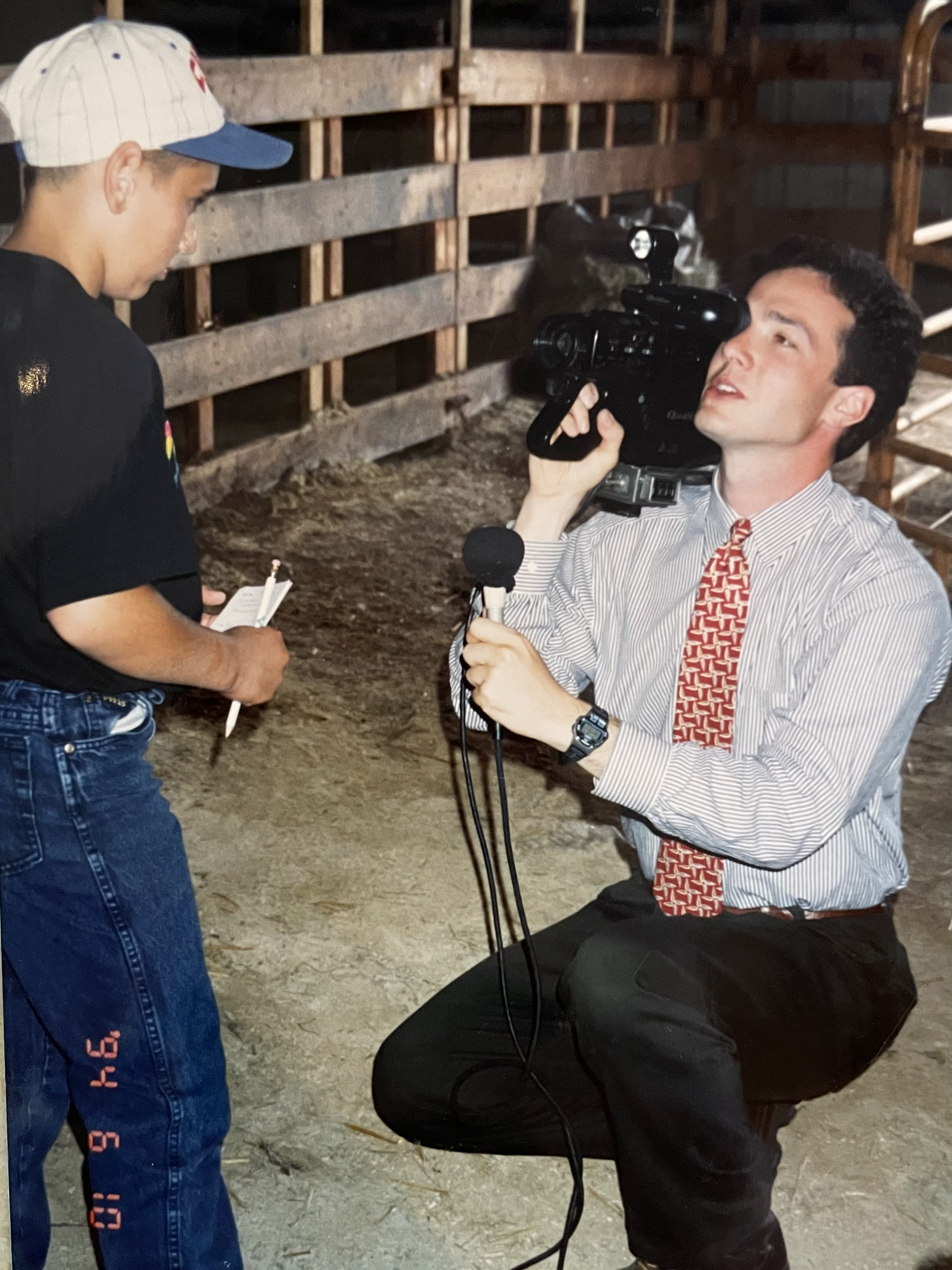
Schechter interviewing a boy in Dubuque, Iowa

After two years in Iowa, Schechter transitioned to WFMJ-TV in Youngstown, Ohio in 1995.

Soon after, Schechter moved to WDAF-TV in Kansas City, Missouri in 1996. In Missouri, Schechter worked as a Special Projects Reporter until 1999.

Schechter worked as an Investigative Reporter at WCCO-TV in Minneapolis, Minnesota from 1999-2006. In Minneapolis, Schechter began investigative reporting with an emphasis on equality with stories like "Access Denied," where he investigated discrimination on the basis of race using hidden cameras at a local club.

At WCCO, Schechter created The Last Flagraiser with photojournalist Thomas Aviles, a 2003 regional-Emmy-winning, documentary length piece following the last living service member from the raising of the flag on Iwo Jima in World War Two. It won Schechter his first Edward R. Murrow Award.

==== WFAA ====
Schechter later moved to WFAA-TV in Dallas, Texas, where he stayed from 2006 to 2022. As a senior reporter, Schechter spent his first ten years at WFAA covering local news. In 2015, Schechter gained recognition for his documentary following the 2013 West Fertilizer Company Explosion; the news documentary, titled Rise Up, West: Recovery Starts on the 50-Yard Line, won Schechter his second Murrow Award.

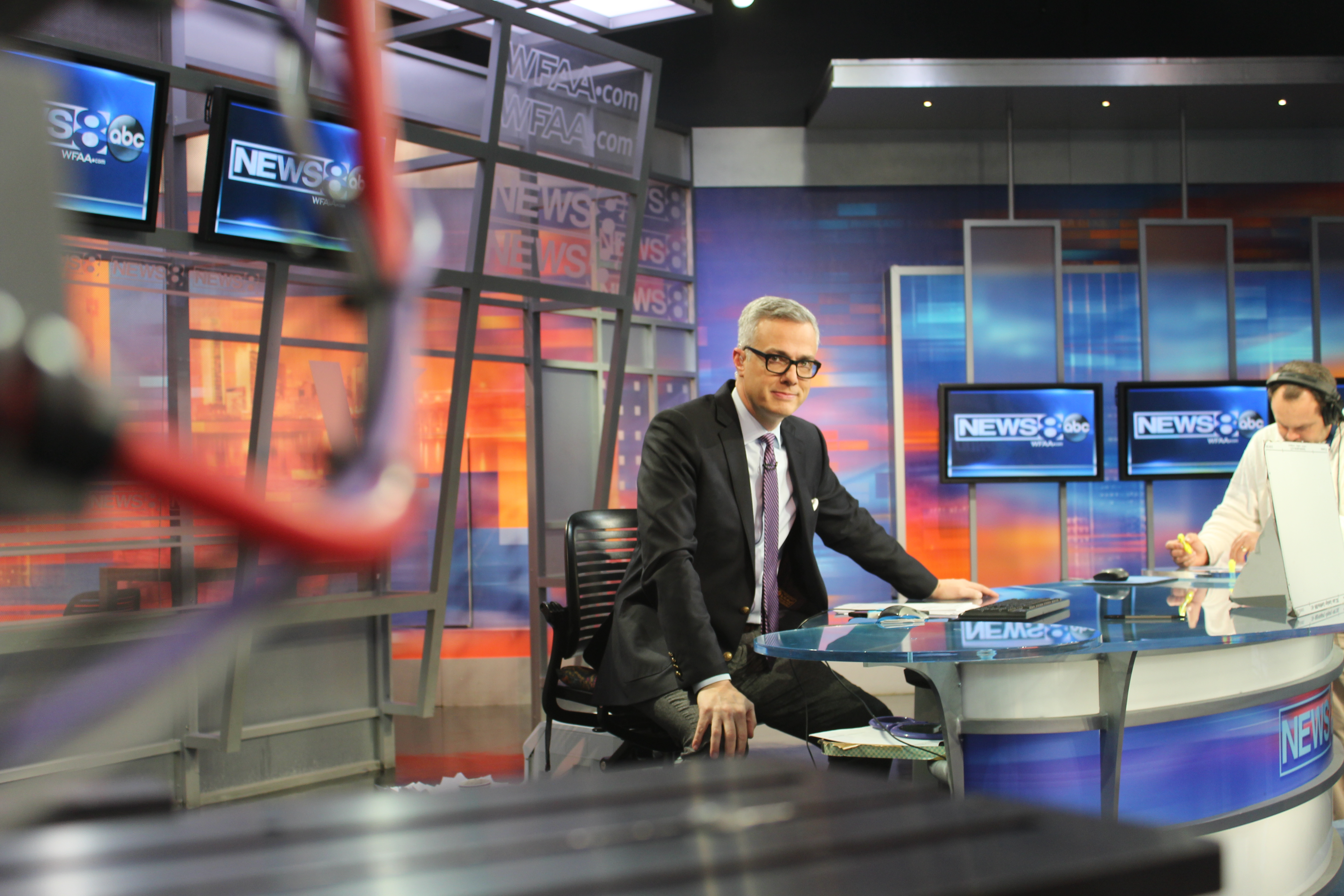
Schechter anchors the WFAA nightly news in 2016

In 2016 Schechter and his partner Chance Horner developed Verify Road Trip, a show in which Schechter would bring a skeptical viewer along with him on a road trip to challenge their beliefs. In 2020, he won his third Murrow Award for "Borderlands" after bringing a conservative viewer to the Texas-Mexico border to examine the implications of expanding the border wall.

In 2020 and 2021, Schechter ran "Banking Below 30," an investigative series that targeted systemic racism in the banking industry, focusing on racial redlining in Dallas. In a congressional hearing, Federal Reserve Chair Jerome Powell stated the series "shows we need real vigilance in making sure that banks honor their obligations to serve minority communities, low- and moderate-income communities, within their operating areas." And that "that [story] got our attention. We can't talk about individual institutions of course, but we take this very seriously."

===== Hurricane Harvey =====
In August 2017, Hurricane Harvey struck Houston, Texas. The storm impacted the technical functioning of Houston based CBS affiliate, KHOU TV. At around 6 am, the storm began to flood the station's studios, causing them to move television operations to the second floor of the station. Later that morning, the station evacuated the building and ceased centralized television coverage and control room operation, leaving the broadcast to field reporter Brandy Smith. At 9:52 am, KHOU went off-air completely, leaving the Houston area without broadcast emergency information.

After the outage, Schechter, along with the WFAA team, organized a takeover of the KHOU broadcast to restore emergency coverage to the Houston area. With remote access, WFAA took over KHOU's Facebook page with Schechter serving as ad hoc anchor for the Houston station. For the next seven hours, Schechter anchored the KHOU news, initially calling Houston reporters over the phone to receive live updates. Around 4:45 pm, the WFAA control room regained connection with reporters in the field, broadcasting their live image and audio. Schechter said of the experience "we were just trying to get [KHOU] people in a position to report out what they were seeing and what they knew because they're the ones that the community trusts."

By 10:00 pm, WFAA and KHOU had begun a simulcast of the flood emergency. At 10:30 pm, WFAA transferred the broadcast back to KHOU.

===== Climate coverage =====
On Verify Road Trip, Schechter began covering climate change, addressing the pattern's threat and need for additional news coverage from a local level.

In 2020, Schechter and his partner, Horner, released "Verify Road Trip: Climate Truth," an hour-long piece that took a climate-change skeptic on the road to investigate his beliefs, from Texas to Alaska. The Chicago Review of Books said of the documentary: "Some folks say you can’t convince a skeptic. But Justin’s story is proof that you can." The piece earned Schechter a 2020 Scripps Howard Award and a 2021 duPont-Columbia Award.

Schechter left WFAA in July 2022 after 16 years at the station.

=== CBS News (2022–present) ===
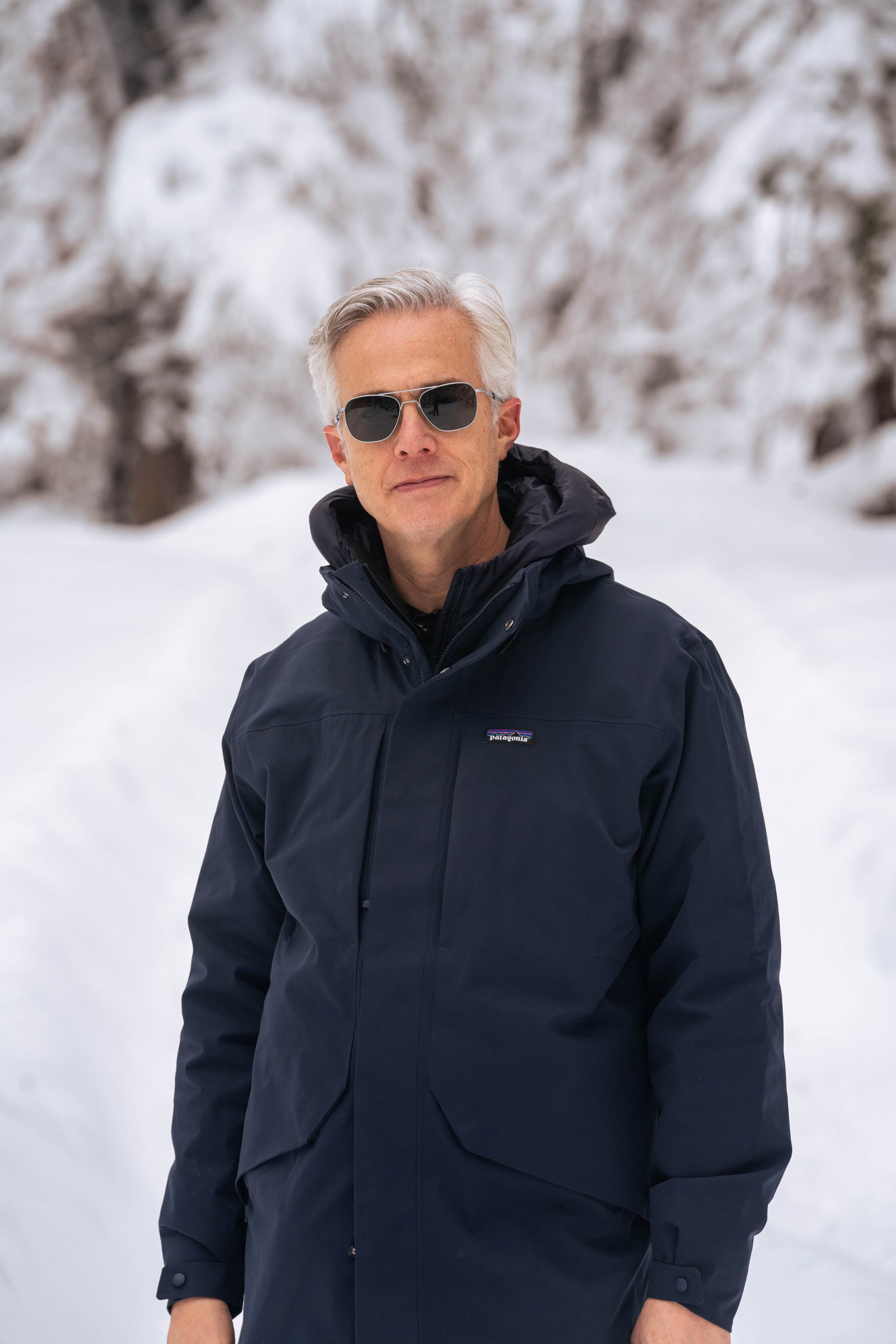
Schechter at a California snow lab in 2023

In August 2022, Schechter announced that he was taking a job at CBS News as a member of their new Innovation Lab, a branch of the business intended to experiment with "next-generation storytelling."

As the National Climate Correspondent for CBS, Schechter runs segments on climate change both locally and nationally. He started at CBS with the show On the Dot with David Schechter, and his work has since transitioned to the CBS Evening News segment Eye on America, CBS Mornings, and CBS Saturday Morning. Schechter released the first episode in January 2023. His pieces have covered forest fires; the effects of light pollution; sea-level rise; climate-change anxiety; university climate divestment; the effects of greenhouse gasses; climate-related extinction, specifically of the Yarrow's spiny lizard; and more.

In December 2023, Schechter capped off CBS's weeklong docu-series "Warming Signs" with an hour-long piece in which he visited Svalbard, Norway, one of the fastest-warming areas on planet earth. In 2023, Schechter co-founded the CBS E-Team, where he trains local reporters, meteorologists, and news managers on how to locally cover climate change.

In September 2024, Schechter became CBS's main climate correspondent after the network revamped their climate team. Soon after, Schechter began taking part in more live appearances on CBS network news under CBS's Climate Watch.

In February 2026, Schechter aired his first segment on CBS's newsmagazine program: CBS Sunday Morning. The piece examined how the climate has changed since George Washington's crossing of the Delaware River in 1776. The story ran as part of a CBS series honoring the American Semiquincentennial.

==== Trump Administration Reporting ====
After the second election of United States President Donald J. Trump, Schechter's work changed as the new president took aim at federal climate and environmental programs. Many of Schechter's post-January 2025 segments cover funding cuts to climate efforts like the Low Income Home Energy Assistance program and logging on federal lands.

Between Trump's November 2024 election and June 2025, Schechter and his team "produced 61 climate stories, 16 that ran on the evening or morning news broadcasts before also streaming, 24 that went directly to streaming, and 22 that were published as digital text stories" on issues from NOAA funding cuts to the 2025 Los Angeles Wildfires. When asked by The Nation about his team's efforts to illuminate political climate issues in the Trump era, Schechter responded "if you look at the 60-plus stories we’ve done, it’d be pretty hard to say that someone is trying to keep us quiet.”

Schechter writes opinion pieces on the how local journalists can better cover climate change.

==== CBS Layoff ====
In October 2025, CBS News appointed Bari Weiss as the editor in chief of the organization. The hire was deemed a "hostile takeover" by the New Yorker. Within weeks, the CBS leadership gutted most of the organization's climate team, leaving Schechter as the sole climate correspondent at the organization.

In March 2026, CBS leadership laid Schechter off from the network, completely eliminating the organization's climate reporting apparatus. One news organization stated that his "departure makes it clear that CBS is no longer willing to even pretend climate is worth covering in a way that reflects the science, the stakes, or the people most affected."

== Personal life ==
Schechter is an Ethics Fellow at the Poynter Institute.

He is a patented inventor for an intelligent news management system.

== Awards ==
Awards
Year	Award name	Work Title	Category	Status
1990	Columbia Scholastic Press Gold Circle Award	At The Half: A Behind the Scenes Look at Pat O'Brien	Print Feature	Won
2006	Edward R. Murrow Awards	The Last Flagraiser	Documentary	Won
2010	Scripps Howard Award	"Deporting Justice"	Series	Won
2015	Edward R. Murrow Awards	Rise Up, West	Documentary	Won
2018	James Beard Foundation Award	Verify Road Trip	Segment	Finalist
2020	Edward R. Murrow Awards	Verify Road Trip: Climate Truth	Documentary	Won
2020	Scripps Howard Award	Verify Road Trip: Climate Truth	Documentary	Won
2020	duPont-Columbia Award	Verify Road Trip: Climate Truth	Documentary	Won
