= Robin Fields =

American journalist (born 1967)

- Born: September 5, 1967 (age 59); New York City
- Education: Masters, Northwestern University Medill School of Journalism; B.A., University of Pennsylvania
- Occupation: Journalist
- Employer: ProPublica
- Awards: The Goldsmith Prize for Investigative Reporting

Robin Fields (born September 5, 1967) is an American journalist, investigative reporter, and managing editor of ProPublica, an independent, not-for-profit news agency.

Fields was born in New York City. She graduated from the University of Pennsylvania in 1991 with a Bachelor of Arts in European history and from Northwestern University Medill School of Journalism with a master's degree in 1993.

== Career ==
After graduating from Medill, Fields was briefly an intern with WBBM-TV until becoming a staff writer and eventually senior writer at The Sun Sentinel in Fort Lauderdale.

In 2010, Fields worked as senior editor before serving as the managing editor in 2013, where she was responsible for day-to-day operations including decisions on stories to cover, supervision of projects, and hiring. In a 2013 article, From Shoe Leather to Big Data: ProPublica and the Future of Watchdog Journalism, she wrote that she was there "to represent the present and future," referring to journalists from an earlier era of investigative journalism.

Some of the projects that Fields worked on, in cooperation with the Public Broadcasting Service (PBS) were made into documentaries, broadcast on the PBS investigative journalism program, Frontline. Two of the documentaries, "Cell Tower Deaths," and "The Child Cases," were nominated for the Emmy Award.

=== Los Angeles Times ===
In 1999 Fields began work at The Los Angeles Times, first in the Orange County Office and then in 2001 moving to the Los Angeles office as a reporter in the Metro Section. During her tenure with the Times, she reported on numerous stories to include chronicling abuses at the J. Paul Getty Trust in 2005 and 2006, and the 2007 investigations into Norman Hsu's political fundraising.

==== Guardianship reporting ====
Fields investigated and covered California's adult guardianship system in a series of stories from 2002 to 2007. An article published in the May/June 2006 issue of The IRE Journal, "Aging Citizens: Steep learning curve for series of stories on guardianship care for the state's elderly," by Fields and colleagues, Evelyn Larrubia and Jack Leonard, described how they discovered that hundreds of senior citizens lost the right to make their own decisions, without their consent, in the California court system. Most were assigned guardians due to health issues, primarily, dementia. They learned that the courts were so backlogged, no one was keeping track of their welfare even though it was mandated by state law. The investigation took years of gathering data in order to build a database; they examined more than 2,400 cases, in five California counties. The four-part series led to the introduction of bills to strengthen regulations, and a task force was created to study the laws that regulate conservatorship.

=== ProPublica ===
In July 2008, ProPublica, a non-profit news organization, announced seven new reporters were joining the staff; Fields was among those who were named as new reporters.

==== 2008: Psychiatric Solutions series ====
While working for ProPublica, Fields, in collaboration with the Los Angeles Times and other news organizations, reported on substandard care, resulting in injuries, sexual assault, and deaths, in a number of facilities under the ownership of Psychiatric Solutions, Incorporated (PSI). During the investigation, it was discovered that the company was earning nearly two-thirds of its revenue from Medicare and Medicaid, maintaining a profit margin of 25%, compared to an average of 6% in other facilities, and employed one-third fewer staffers per bed in order to secure higher profits for the organization. The company was fined multiple times for safety violations, and at one facility, the federal government took the unusual step of termination from the Medicare program, withholding federal funds from one facility, for a period of over four months, and costing PSI over 1.5 million in lost revenue. PSI was still allowed to continue providing psychiatric care.

After CEO, Joey Jacobs, replaced a management team at one facility, saying it would "continue to get better," the problems continued. Allegations that the director and other PSI officials made material misstatements and omissions about the company finances and liabilities, in order to inflate stock prices, caused its stock prices to drop, resulting in large shareholder losses. As more reports were published about the problems at PSI, the United States Department of Justice (DOJ) began investigations into the healthcare company, and a class action lawsuit was filed. The company was eventually purchased by Universal Health Services, who also paid $132 million in a settlement with the DOJ and other state agencies, for violations of the False Claims Act.

==== 2010: Dialysis series ====
After joining with ProPublica, Fields made multiple Freedom of Information Act (FOIA) requests with the Centers for Medicare & Medicaid Services (CMS). After two years of delays, Fields, now senior editor, began reporting on practices of the kidney dialysis industry.

The series of stories, "Dialysis: High Costs and Hidden Perils of Treatment Guaranteed for All," was awarded the Gannett Foundation Award for Investigative Journalism. The series prompted Chuck Grassley to call for an investigation into CMS, and led to a Grand Jury investigation by the U.S. Attorney's Office in Colorado, into DaVita Inc., the second-largest dialysis provider in the United States. In 2013, she described the systemic issues in American dialysis, and how the U.S. spent more money per patient than any other country, but with poorer results. In describing the beginnings of the investigation, she recalled:

"In my initial interviews, when I asked dialysis industry insiders to describe the level of care, several called it the health-care equivalent of a factory assembly line."

— Robin Fields, From Shoe Leather to Big Data: ProPublica and the Future of Watchdog Journalism, Nieman Reports

On November 9, 2010, ProPublica released a story outlining how an umbrella group, Kidney Care Partners, planned to spin the dialysis investigation; they published leaked public relations materials.

In December 2011, Fields' story titled, "God Help You, You're on Dialysis: why do one in four people on dialysis die?" was featured in The Atlantic magazine; the piece was a finalist for the Association of Magazine Media, National Magazine Award for a public interest story.

It wasn't until the Atlantic story was published, that CMS agreed to release data that was used to create the data tracker on the ProPublica website, set-up to assist kidney dialysis patients compare dialysis centers in order to receive the best care. As of June, 2013, the tracker had over 190,000 page views; it's updated annually and Fields considered it to be her "most significant product of [her] reporting."

== Awards and recognition ==
- 2011 Winner Gannett Foundation Award for Innovative Investigative Journalism for the series, "Dialysis: High Costs and Hidden Perils of Treatment Guaranteed for All"
- 2011 Finalist National Magazine Awards, for "God Help You, You're on Dialysis: why do one in four people on dialysis die?"
- 2006 Winner Associated Press Managing Editors Public Service Award, for the guardianship series
- 2006 Finalist Goldsmith Prize for Investigative Reporting
- 2005 Winner National Journalism Awards for Investigative Reporting, for the guardianship series
- 2005 Winner Sigma Delta Chi Public Service Award, for the guardianship series
- 1999 Winner Sunshine State Awards, South Florida Society of Professional Journalists, first place, non-deadline business reporting, for the series "How Florida Cheats Itself on Sales Tax"
- 1999 Second Place Florida Society of Newspaper Editors, for investigative reporting, for the series "Paved with Gold"
- 1998 Third Place Sunshine State Awards, South Florida Society of Professional Journalists, for non-deadline business reporting
