= Harley Schwadron =

American cartoonist

Harley Schwadron is an American cartoonist whose work appears in newspapers and magazines. His work appears regularly in the Wall Street Journal, Barron's Magazine, Forbes, Harvard Business Review, Playboy, National Law Journal, Reader's Digest as well as many smaller publications. He draws a daily syndicated business panel, 9 to 5, for Tribune Content Agency.

Schwadron's op-ed cartoons appear in such publications as Washington Post, Christian Science Monitor, Washington Times, Liberal Opinion Week and many others. For many years he worked as a cartoonist for England's Punch Magazine. He lives and works in Ann Arbor, Michigan.

== Books ==
Schwadron has illustrated many books, including No Husband Should Be Without a Wife (with Dick Emmons), The Money is the Gravy: Finding a Career that Nourishes You (Time Warner), 101 President Jokes (Scholastic), 101 Cat and Dog Jokes (Scholastic), and more than 25 Chicken Soup for the Soul books. His cover and inside illustrations have appeared in University of Michigan Alumnus, Bowdoin Alumni Magazine, U. Michigan Dividend Magazine and U-M Institute for Social Research newsletters, among others. His "Zeke the Geek" posters illustrated a U. Michigan campus computer password safety campaign. His cartoons have been reprinted in more than 1000 college and professional textbooks.

While at the University of Michigan, Schwadron was the 1982 winner of the College Cartoonist Charles M. Schulz Award, presented by the National Journalism Awards.

Schwadron first worked as an urban affairs reporter for the Hartford Times and then became a writer and law school alumni magazine editor at the University of Michigan News Service. After 20 years as a writer and editor, he became a full-time cartoonist in 1985.
