= Charles Scripps =

American publisher

Charles E. Scripps (January 27, 1920 – February 3, 2007) was chairman of the board of the E. W. Scripps Company, a media conglomerate founded by his grandfather, Edward W. Scripps. Under his leadership the company was transformed from a family-owned newspaper publisher into a major publicly traded media company with major cable television operations.

== Biography ==
Charles Scripps was born to Robert Paine Scripps and Margaret Culbertson Scripps on January 27, 1920, in San Diego. He attended The College of William and Mary in Virginia and Pomona College in California.

He began his newspaper career before World War II as a police and courts reporter at The Cleveland Press, the first newspaper his grandfather founded (in 1878).

In the mid-1980s Scripps became an advocate for promotion of literacy. In 1986, the Scripps Howard Foundation created an annual award in his name to honor literacy efforts by newspapers and broadcast stations.

Ohio University awarded him an honorary doctor of communications degree in 1983, recognizing his contributions to communications and his "championship of press freedom worldwide."
