= Ken Ward Jr. =

American journalist

Ken Ward Jr. is a co-founder of Mountain State Spotlight and former staff reporter for the Charleston Gazette-Mail and writes about the coal mining industry and its impacts on Appalachian communities. He is chairman of the Society of Environmental Journalists First Amendment Task Force, founded in 2002 "to address freedom-of-information, right-to-know, and other news gathering issues of concern to the pursuit of environmental journalism." He announced on Monday, February 24, that this would be his last day.

== Personal ==
Ward is a native of Mineral County, West Virginia. He obtained his degree from West Virginia University.

== Career ==
He began working at the Charleston Gazette in 1991. His work has focused on mine safety, mountaintop removal, environmental and labor issues. He has covered the Sago and the Upper Big Branch Mine disasters that killed 29 West Virginia coal miners.

== Honors and awards ==
Ward won an Alicia Patterson Journalism Fellowship in 2006 to research and write about mining deaths in the coal industry. He is also a three-time winner of the Scripps Howard Foundation's Edward J. Meeman Award for his environmental reporting and won the Livingston Award for Young Journalists in 2000. His work and research on coal mine issues as an Alicia Patterson Fellow earned him an Investigative Reporters and Editors medal.

In October 2018, Ward was named a MacArthur Fellow (popularly known as "Genius Grants") by the John D. and Catherine T. MacArthur Foundation. Ward is the first MacArthur Fellow to be living in West Virginia at the time of their award; the three previous recipients from West Virginia had moved away.

== See also ==
- Environmental issues in Appalachia
- Environmental justice and coal mining in Appalachia
