= Bruce Ingersoll =

American journalist

Bruce Ingersoll (1941 – December 1, 2001) was an American journalist who wrote for the Chicago Sun-Times and The Wall Street Journal.

== Life and career ==
Ingersoll was born and grew up in St. Paul, Minnesota. His father died when he was 11; at that point he and his sisters, Laura and Brenda, lived in the foster home of the Patricia and Robert Penshorn family and occasionally with his uncle Herbert L. Lewis, the editor of the Saint Paul Pioneer Press. Ingersoll graduated from the Saint Paul Academy, and earned a bachelor's degree in history from Carleton College.

Ingersoll started his journalism career as a copyboy at the City News Bureau of Chicago, in 1963. He went on to the Minneapolis Tribune, and then to be a journalist at the Chicago Sun-Times, where he spent 14 years, including six at the paper's Washington Bureau, in D.C. He was the paper's first "environmental reporter". He then was hired by The Wall Street Journal, where he spent the rest of his career.

Among his noteworthy efforts were the coverage of allegations that led to charges against a former Secretary of Agriculture, Mike Espy, and an article about the continued Federal subsidy of mohair for 35 years after the military stopped using it in uniforms in 1960, a scandal in which he targeted fellow journalist Sam Donaldson for receiving hundreds of thousands of dollars while "absentee" on his inherited ranch. His article, As Congress Considers Slashing Crop Subsidies, Affluent Urban Farmers Come Under Scrutiny, was read into the Congressional Record.

In 2001, Ingersoll died of myelodysplastic syndrome after being irradiated at 3-Mile Island while reporting for The Chicago Sun-Times

=== Awards ===
During his career, Ingersoll was nominated for the Pulitzer Prize, twice. He also was awarded:

- Environmental Reporting Edward J. Meeman Award Grand Prize (1978)
- The Hillman Prize for a series on the working wounded (1978)
- 2 Washington Correspondence Awards from the National Press Club (1981)
- Worth Bingham Prize for Defense Dilemmas (1982)
- Raymond Clapper Memorial Award (1983)
- National Association of Agricultural Journalists naaj.net
  - 1st Prize, an article on lax government oversight of poultry processing (1991)
  - 1st Prize for Feature Writing (1992)
  - 1st Place, News Category, for his coverage of allegations leading to the indictment of Agriculture Secretary Mike Espy (1998)
- In 2003, the North American Agricultural Journalists launched the Bruce Ingersoll Mentorship Award, a yearly cash prize awarded for excellence in agricultural journalism
