= Alison Young (journalist) =

American journalist

Alison Young is an American journalist. She is the Curtis B. Hurley Chair in Public Affairs Reporting at the University of Missouri.

She has worked for USA Today, the Detroit Free Press, and The Atlanta Journal-Constitution.

She received three National Press Club Awards, three Scripps Howard Awards, three Gerald Loeb Awards, the Hillman Prize, a Sigma Delta Chi Award, and an Alfred I. duPont-Columbia University Award. Several awards were granted for her story "Ghost Factories" about the health effects of lead-contaminated soil.

Young was president of Investigative Reporters and Editors.

In 2023, she authored the book Pandora's Gamble Lab Leaks, Pandemics, and a World at Risk about the history of biological leaks from research institutions.
