= Herbert L. Lewis =

American journalist and newspaper editor

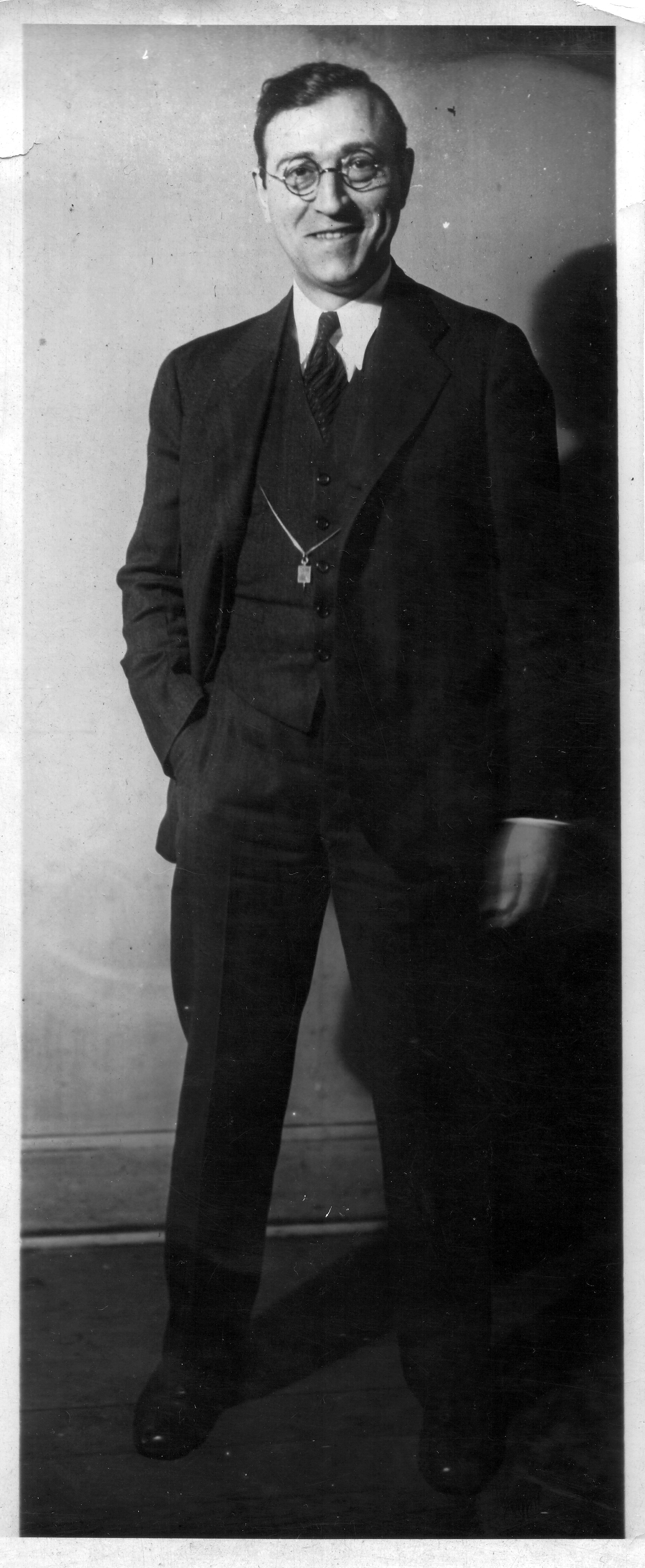

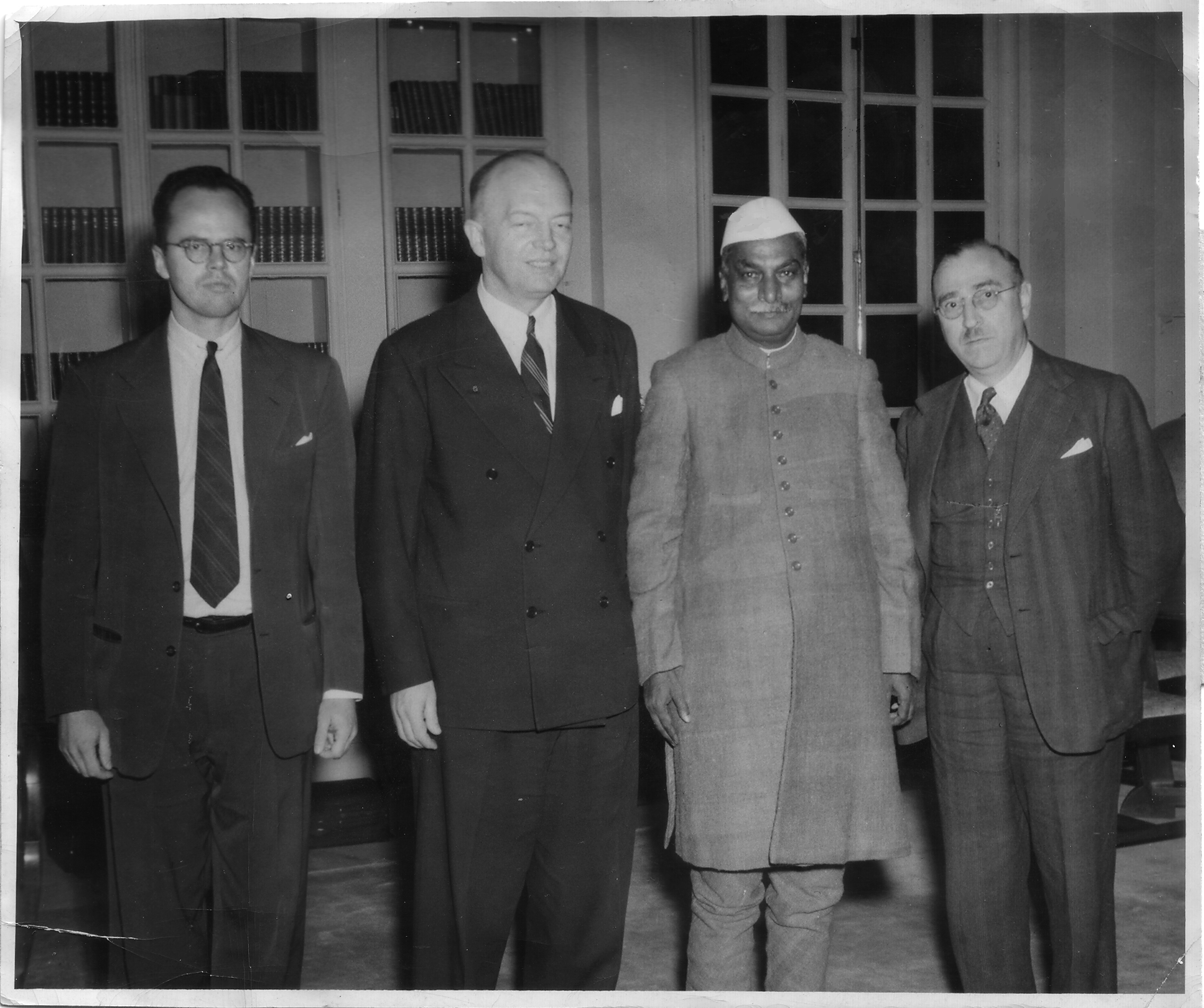

Herbert L. Lewis (Lefkovitz, Lefkowitz) (1898-1971) was an American journalist and newspaper editor. He was the editor of the St. Paul Pioneer Press (formerly the Dispatch) from 1949 to 1964 and a longtime contributor to the New York Times, who played a key role in transforming St. Paul into a model of good government.

== Early life and education ==
Lewis was born on October 16, 1898, in Austin Minnesota as Herbert Louis Lefkovitz. When Herbert was young, he and his family moved to Marshall, MN, where they were one of two Jewish families. Herbert’s father Joseph Lefkovitz, emigrated from Kosice in the Austro Hungarian empire, and his mother Regina emigrated from Saarbrucken in the Saar Valley.

In 1916 Herbert Lefkovitz started working as a reporter for the St. Paul Pioneer Press and Dispatch while he pursued a BA at the University of Minnesota. In 1918, he served in the U.S. Army at Fort Sheridan in Illinois. In 1920 he won the Intercollegiate Harris Prize in Political Science. In 1921 he won a Root-Tilden fellowship to support graduate studies at Harvard University, which he declined when his father had become ill with cancer and his family needed Herbert to provide an income. Herbert received his BA in Political Science in 1920, and Masters in Political Science in 1921, both from the University of Minnesota.

In 1930 Herbert married Georgiana Ingersoll of St. Paul. They had 3 children: Piers, Georgiana, and Finlay.

In 1938 Herbert changed his surname from Lefkovitz to Lewis, explaining to his family that since he could not provide any of the benefits of being Jewish, such as community and traditions, he did not want to pass on the liabilities that came with discrimination. At the time there was strong anti-Semitism in many parts of the U.S., including the Twin Cities.

Herbert’s son Finlay Lewis was a journalist for the Minneapolis Tribune and the Copley New Service. Herbert’s nephew Bruce Ingersoll was a journalist with the Wall Street Journal, and his niece Brenda Ingersoll was a reporter for the Chicago Tribune. Bruce’s son Archie is news editor for The Forum of Fargo-Moorhead.

== Career ==
In 1922 Herbert became an editorial writer for the St. Paul Pioneer Press. In the 1920s Herbert wrote speeches for then governor of New York Al Smith, and wrote the agricultural plank for his run for the presidency in 1928 where he focused on the crisis in the agricultural sector growing from the dislocations of World War I and the return to a so-called normalcy.

In 1937 Herbert was appointed editorial director for Northwest Publications.

Hebert was a regular contributor to New York Times throughout the 1930s and 40s. In 1941 Herbert was appointed Washington correspondent to the Pioneer Press. During World War II Herbert was based in London where he served as a war correspondent for the Pioneer Press and the New York Times.

In 1949 he became managing editor of the St. Paul Pioneer Press and Dispatch, a position he held until retirement in 1964 as editor in chief. In 1950 Herbert traveled around the world with Republican presidential nominee Harold Stassen, a journey that concluded in London with an exclusive interview with Dwight D. Eisenhower. In the interview, Eisenhower sent a signal to the Republican Party that he intended to run for president.

Herbert worked as editorial consultant to the St. Paul Pioneer Press and Dispatch until his death in 1971.
