= Tom Cheney (cartoonist) =

American cartoonist

- Born: 1954 (age 71–72) Norfolk, Virginia, US
- Areas: Cartoonist, Artist
- Awards: College Cartoonist Charles M. Schulz Award, 1985

Tom Cheney (born 1954) is an American cartoonist. He was born in Norfolk, Virginia and grew up in Saranac Lake, New York, and later in Watertown, New York. He attended Watertown High School (class of '72), and graduated from the State University of New York at Potsdam in 1976 with a BA in psychology.

A contributing artist to The New Yorker for 48 years, his work has also appeared in over 500 other publications in the United States and other countries, including Esquire, National Lampoon, The Harvard Business Review, Mad Magazine, Penthouse, The Wall Street Journal, Punch, Barron's Magazine, Hustler, and the Commies From Mars comic book series (issues #4–5, 1982–1986, Last Gasp).

His cartoons have been spotlighted on ABC Nightline, CNN, CBS 60 Minutes, and NBC News.

Originals of Cheney's work are on permanent display at the Museum of Cartoon Art, the New-York Historical Society, the headquarters of the United Nations, and the Empire State Building, as well as in numerous private collections. Tom and his wife Cynthia live on the island of Kauai in Hawaii.
