= Rochelle Riley =

American journalist

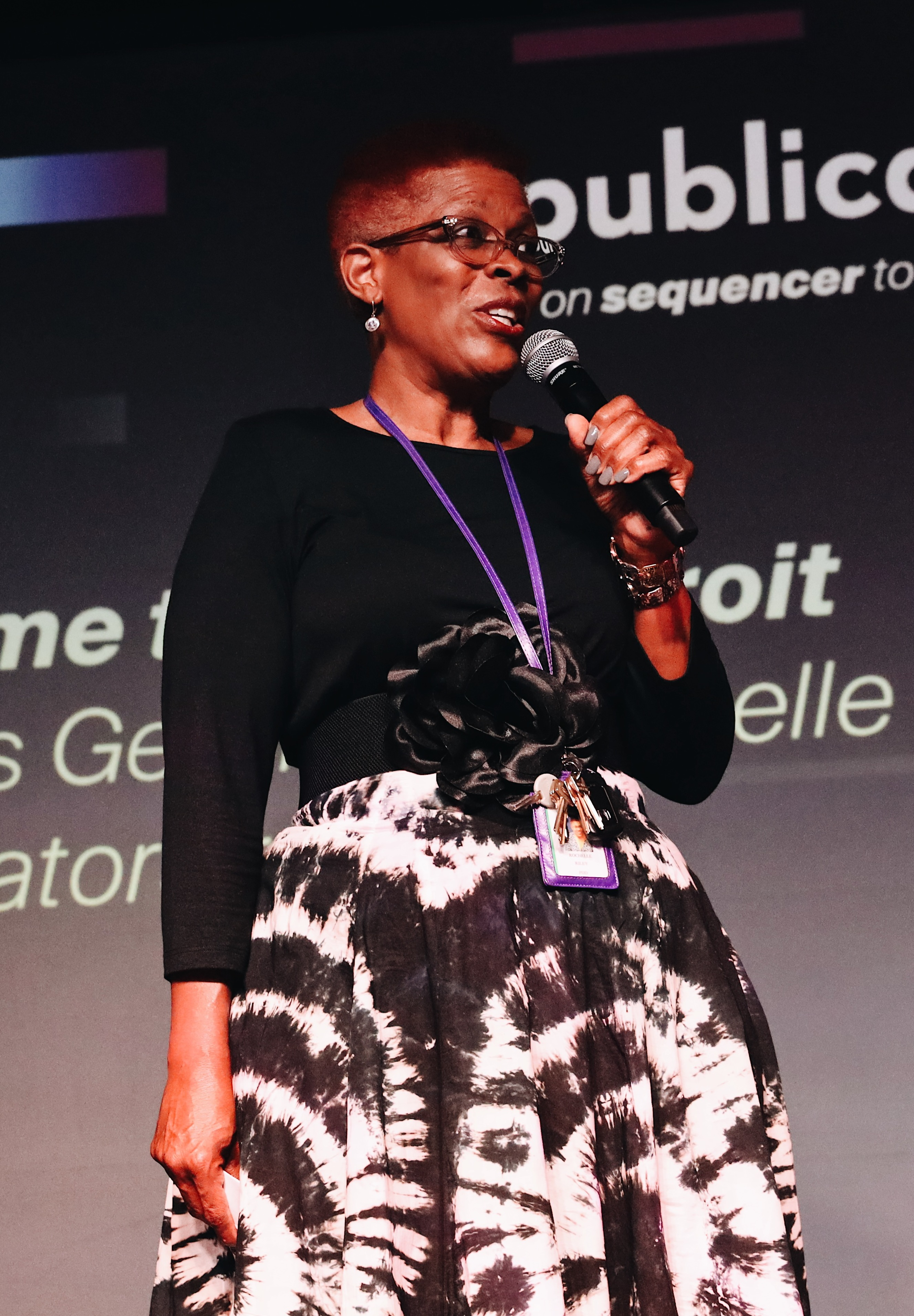
Rochelle Riley in 2019

Rochelle Riley is an American journalist. She is the Director of Arts and Culture for the City of Detroit. She formerly was a nationally syndicated columnist for the Detroit Free Press in Detroit, Michigan, United States. She was an advocate in her column for improved race relations, literacy, community building, and children.

== Personal life ==
Rochelle Riley grew up in Tarboro, North Carolina where she was raised in part by her grandfather Willie Bennie Pitt and grandmother Lowney Hilliard Pitt.

Riley has said that her grandmother's curiosity influenced her own curiosity about current events and their impact on our lives. Riley has one daughter. She attended the University of North Carolina at Chapel Hill, where she majored in journalism and English.

== Career ==
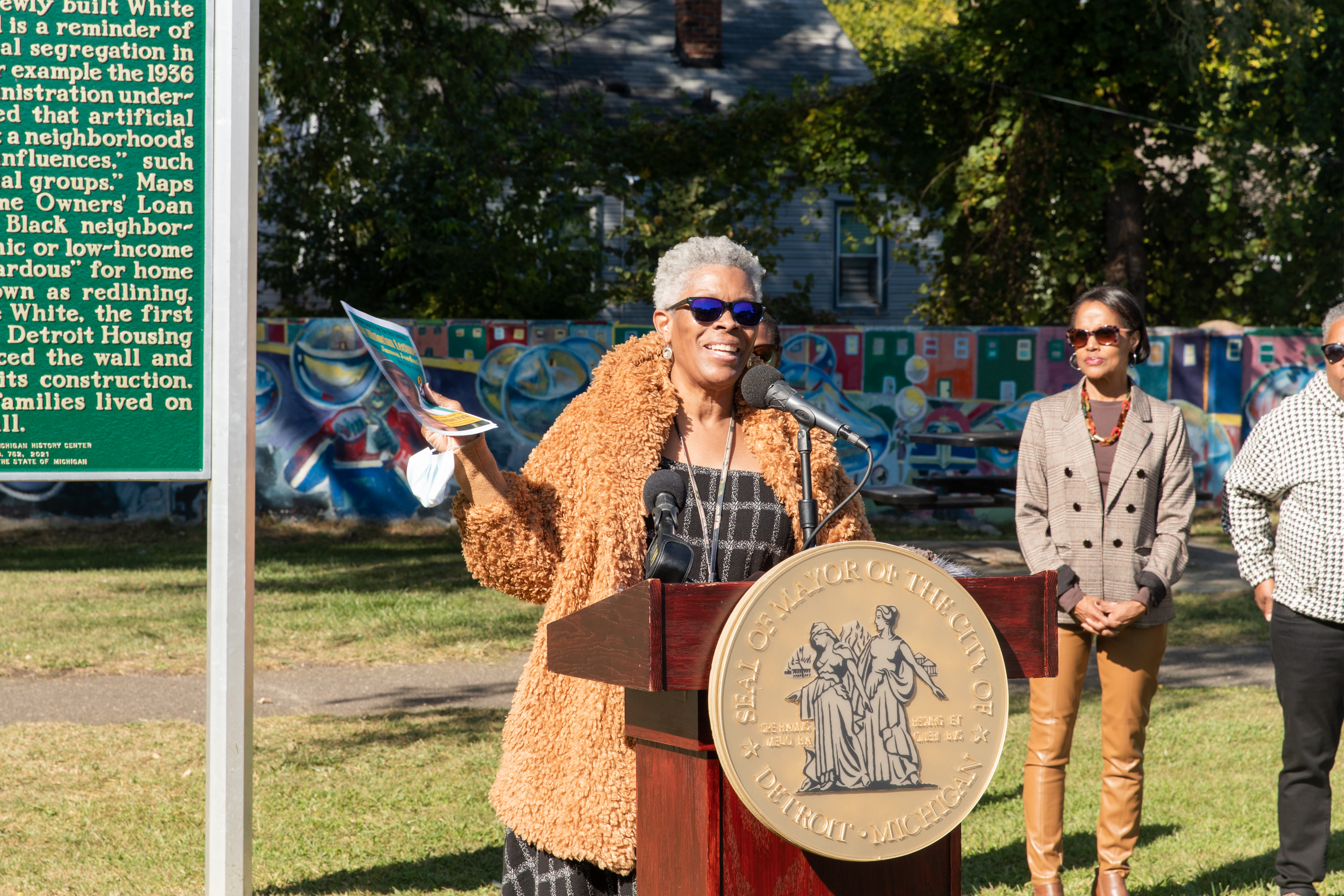
Riley speaking at a City of Detroit event in 2022

Rochelle Riley has appeared on NPR, MSNBC, CNN and WJBK FOX2 Detroit. She has worked as an editor or reporter at The Washington Post, The Dallas Morning News, the Dallas Times Herald and The (Louisville) Courier-Journal. In Louisville, she was deputy managing editor, 1992–96, associate editor and columnist, 1996–2000; and from 2000 to 2019, she was a Detroit Free Press columnist. In 1985, when she was with The Dallas Morning News, she founded the DFW/ABC Urban Journalism Workshop to train minority youth to be journalists. In 2008, she completed a Knight-Wallace Fellowship at the University of Michigan.

== Notable works of journalism ==
Her columns about former Detroit Mayor Kwame Kilpatrick were a part of the entry that won the 2009 Pulitzer Prize in local reporting. She is also notable for her excellence in journalism and for mentoring future journalists to ensure that newsrooms reflect the diversity of their communities, which is why she won the Ida B. Wells Award from the National Association of Black Journalists and Northwestern University in 2017. She also is known for advocating for press freedom as a member of the International Press Institute and the NABJ Global Journalism Task Force. She has spent years crusading for better lives for children, government accountability, improved race relations and increased adult literacy, by helping to raise nearly $2 million for literacy causes in Michigan.

== Context ==
Riley was known as one of the top African-American journalists in the United States; she has received several awards for her nationally syndicated columns. When she was named deputy managing editor of The Courier-Journal in Louisville in 1992, Riley became the newspaper's first African-American news executive.

== Bibliography ==
- That They Lived: African Americans Who Changed The World (Wayne State University Press, 2021)
- The Burden: African Americans and the Enduring Impact of Slavery (Wayne State University Press, 2018)

== Awards ==
- 2021 Inductee, National Association of Black Journalists Hall of Fame
- 2019 Inductee, N.C. Media and Journalism Hall of Fame
- 2019 National Headliner Award
- 2017, NABJ Ida B. Wells Award
- 2017, Pulliam Editorial Fellowship
- 2016, Inductee Michigan Journalism Hall of Fame
- 2013, National Headliner Award
- 2011, National Scripps Howard Award
- 2011, Will Rogers Humanitarian Award, National Society of Newspaper Columnists.
- 2010, Harvey Beech Distinguished Alumni Award from the University of North Carolina Alumni Association BAR Committee
- 2009, Pulitzer Prize for local reporting
- 2004, National Journalism Award for Distinguished Service to Literacy Scripps Howard Foundation.

== See also ==
- National Association of Black Journalists
