= Lane DeGregory =

American journalist

Lane DeGregory is an American journalist who works for the Tampa Bay Times—St. Petersburg Times. She won the Pulitzer Prize for Feature Writing in 2009, recognizing "The Girl In the Window" (August 3, 2008)—"her moving, richly detailed story of a neglected little girl, found in a roach-infested room, unable to talk or feed herself, who was adopted by a new family committed to her nurturing."

DeGregory has won dozens of other national journalism awards and has taught at universities and conferences across the country. In 2011, she was named a fellow by the Society of Professional Journalists.

DeGregory created a newspaper for her elementary school and was Editor-in-Chief of her high school newspaper in Rockville, Maryland. She received bachelor's and master's degrees in Rhetoric & Communication Studies from the University of Virginia. As an undergraduate, she was editor-in-chief of the student newspaper The Cavalier Daily.
