= Jim G. Lucas =

American journalist

James Grifing Lucas (June 24, 1915 – July 22, 1971) was a war correspondent for Scripps-Howard Newspapers who won a 1954 Pulitzer Prize for International Reporting "for his notable front-line human interest reporting of the Korean War, the cease-fire and the prisoner-of-war exchanges, climaxing 26 months of distinguished service as a war correspondent." He also reported on the Vietnam War and wrote a book about his experiences, Dateline: Vietnam.

Born in Checotah, Oklahoma, the son of Jim Bob Lucas, Jr. and Effie Lincoln Griffing, he began his journalism career as the editor of his high school newspaper. Lucas attended the University of Missouri before going to work for the Muskogee Phoenix as a feature writer. He also worked in broadcasting for KBIX in Muskogee and for the Tulsa Tribune. During World War II, Lucas became a combat correspondent with the Marines, and began his association with Scripps-Howard before the end of the war. At the Battle of Tarawa, he was listed as killed in action for three days. For Lucas' vivid descriptions of that battle, he was awarded the 1943 National Headliners Award.

He was the first recipient of the Ernie Pyle Memorial Award, and the first person to receive it twice: first for his 1953 reporting on the Korean War, and again for his 1964 reporting on the Vietnam War. Lucas also was awarded a Bronze Star and a Presidential Unit Citation for his Marine service. The Virginia Chapter of the United States Marine Corps Combat Correspondents Association is named the Jim G. Lucas Chapter.

He remained single all his life and died of abdominal cancer in Washington, DC.
