= Gordon Bishop =

Gordon Bishop (1946 – July 21, 2007) founded Joyo Indonesia News, an email-based wire of English-speaking Indonesian news.

== Early life ==
Bishop was born in New York City in a middle class Jewish family. The family's original last name was Dubjinsky. Bishop was a political activist in his early life, supporting underground movements against the U.S. war in Vietnam.

In the late 1960s Bishop began traveling around the world and ended up in Indonesia. In Yogyakarta he met his wife-to-be, Nanies Siti Ahadiah Suryodiprodjo, a Javanese lady with royal blood who was performing Javanese dance during Indonesia's independence day. They married, had a daughter Naomi Melati Bishop, and the family ended up living in Central Java.

In 1993, a traffic accident killed Bishop's wife and left Bishop with medical problems that forced him to return to New York City for medical treatment. He was subsequently blacklisted by the Suharto led Indonesian government and unable to return to Indonesia.

== Joyo Indonesia News ==
In the summer of 1996, Bishop obtained a computer and began compiling news on Indonesia and distributed it to close friends, including Indonesians. At that time, the Indonesian press was still restricted, and the news distributed by Bishop helped bring outside perspective to Indonesian readers. As a consequence, the email distribution grew organically and became Joyo Indonesia News. Gordon adopted an alias of Joyo, derived from Joyoboyo, a Javanese poet. The newswire was part of Internet activism in Indonesia that contributed to civil activism and a student movement that ultimately toppled down Suharto in 1998.

The Joyo email news letter was distributed daily. By 2001, Joyo Indonesia News distributed free of charge more than 80,000 news articles to subscribers. Bishop worked from his apartment in New York despite crippling medical conditions including blindness in one eye, difficulties walking, and cancer. Later, as Bishop's health failed, others helped Bishop in the distribution of Joyo Indonesia News articles.

In 2005, Bishop won the Suardi Tasrif Award, an award for the protection of freedom of opinion and civil rights, from the Independent Journalist Alliance (AJI).

Bishop died July 21, 2007, from complications due to cancer.
