= Sam Roe =

American journalist

Sam Roe is an American journalist who was part of a team of reporters at the Chicago Tribune that won the 2008 Pulitzer Prize for Investigative Reporting for an examination of hazardous toys and other children's products. He is currently an editor for the Milwaukee Journal Sentinel. Roe also has been a Pulitzer Prize finalist four times.

In 2000, while at The Blade, Roe was a Pulitzer finalist for Investigative Reporting for exposing a 50-year pattern of misconduct by the American beryllium industry, whose production of the metal for nuclear weapons resulted in the deaths and injuries of dozens of workers.

In 2011, Roe was a Pulitzer finalist for Investigative Reporting for a series of articles about 13 deaths at a Chicago nursing facility for children and young adults with severe disabilities.

In 2013, Roe was a Pulitzer finalist for Investigative Reporting for articles that exposed how manufacturers imperiled public health by continuing to use toxic flame retardants in household furniture and crib mattresses, triggering reforms at the state and national level. The series won the Gerald Loeb Award for Large Newspapers.

In 2017, Roe was a Pulitzer finalist for Public Service for "innovative and superbly written and illustrated reporting that not only checked perilous practices by pharmacies in dispensing prescription drugs but also prevented harm from happening in the first place." The series won the Gerald Loeb Award for Investigative Reporting."
