= Scripps Howard Foundation =

Public charity

Scripps Howard Fund
- Formation: Foundation: 1962; 64 years ago
- Type: Charitable foundation
- Purpose: "Creating informed and engaged communities through journalism education, childhood literacy, and local causes."
- Headquarters: Cincinnati, Ohio
- CEO: Liz Carter
- Parent organization: E. W. Scripps Company
- Affiliations: Scripps Howard Foundation
- Budget: $100 million (c. 2009)
- Disbursements: $6 million (2021)
- Website: scripps.com/fund/

The Scripps Howard Fund is a public charity that supports philanthropic causes important to the E. W. Scripps Company, an American media conglomerate which owns television stations, cable television networks, and other media outlets. The Fund's mission, according to its website, is "creating informed and engaged communities through journalism education, childhood literacy, and local causes." The headquarters are situated together with the Scripps Company in Cincinnati, Ohio.

The Scripps Howard Foundation, a sister organization of the Scripps Howard Fund, supports Scripps’ charitable efforts through an endowment fund, key assets, and major donations. Established in 1962, the foundation became the largest corporate foundation in the Greater Cincinnati area. Its annual budget ballooned from $100,000 in 1971 to more than $100 million. It also manages the Greater Cincinnati Fund and presents the annual Scripps Howard Awards, awarding $160,000 for the 2020 awards, distributed among 17 winners.

Between the Fund and the Foundation, in 2021, Scripps gave away more than $6 million: "$1 million ... to childhood literacy, $3.1 million ... to journalism and First Amendment causes, and ... $2 million ... to nonprofits nationwide that were recommended by Scripps television stations and their audiences."

The Scripps Howard Foundation, along with Roy Howard's children, established the Roy W. Howard Archive at the Indiana University School of Journalism in 1983. Additionally, it established the Scripps Howard School of Journalism and Communications at Hampton University in Virginia. A $15 million dollar donation in 2006 led to the renaming of the now Scripps College of Communication at Ohio University.

In 2018, the foundation established the Howard Center for Investigative Journalism at the University of Maryland Philip Merrill College of Journalism and Arizona State University Walter Cronkite School of Journalism and Mass Communication.

== Scripps Howard Awards ==
The Scripps Howard Awards, formerly the National Journalism Awards, are $10,000 awards (in 17 categories in 2022) in American journalism given by the foundation.

From 1980 to 2010, the foundation annually awarded the "College Cartoonist Charles M. Schulz Award" to a student drawing cartoons for their college newspaper. In 1997 the Award was for $2,000. In the 2000s it was for $10,000.
