= Herbert Weiss =

American journalist

- Born: Herbert P. Weiss; June 25, 1954 (age 72); Dallas, Texas, U.S.
- Education: Hillcrest High School; University of Texas at Austin; North Texas State University; University of Maryland, Baltimore County
- Occupations: Author; journalist
- Spouse: Patricia S. Zacks (D'Angelo)
- Children: 2
- Parent(s): Frank Weiss; Sally Weiss

Herbert "Herb" P. Weiss (born June 25, 1954) is an American author and journalist. He is best known for his work as a writer and as an arts and cultural ambassador for the city of Pawtucket.

== Early life and education ==
Weiss was born on June 25, 1954, in Dallas, Texas to the late Frank and Sally Weiss.

In 1972 he graduated from Hillcrest High School and went on to receive a bachelor's degree in psychology with a social work certificate from the University of Texas at Austin in 1977. Later he received a master's of Arts in Aging Studies in 1979 from North Texas State University. Weiss also completed 24 credits of a doctorate in public policy and aging from the University of Maryland, Baltimore County from 1980 to 1985.

== Journalistic career ==
Weiss published his first article in 1980 on aging. and worked as a journalist for over 45 years. He has authored or co-authored more than 1,111 articles on aging, health care and medical issues. Weiss’ columns regularly appear in newspapers throughout Rhode Island and news blogs. He writes a weekly “Age Beat” commentary covering issues that impact America's baby boomers and seniors, published in the Pawtucket Times and Woonsocket Call.

The American College of Health Care Administrators recognized his work with 1994 and 1999 National Journalism Awards. He received the 1998 Distinguished Alumnus award from the Department of Applied Gerontology at the University of North Texas in 1998, and the AARP Rhode Island's 2004 Vision Award.

In 2024, the RI Minority Task Force honored him for his years of coverage of aging issues in Rhode Island.

From 1983 to 2009, Weiss has served on the editorial advisory boards of the following publications covering long-term care: The Brown LTC Quality Letter (1993); McKnight's LTC News (1992–2000); Aging Network News (1991–1993); The Journal of Long Term Care Administrators (1985–1995); and Contemporary Long Term Care (1983–1990). In January 1997, McKnight's LTC News named Weiss one of its “100 Most Influential People” in the Long-Term Care industry.

Since 2018, Weiss has been a member of the Order of the Occult Hand.

Weiss oversaw editorial content for seven nationally published trade newsletters and newspapers. These include founding editor of Aging Network News (1985 to 1988); editor of three medical-related national newsletters on CPT and CPR coding, as well as Medicare reimbursement issues for physicians (1988 to 1990); editor of Senior Law Report and Marketing to Seniors (1990–1991); managing editor of Brown LTQ Quality Letter (1993); the Blackstone Valley beat for The Providence Journal (1994) and founding editor of Senior Living, now called Prime Time (1997 to 1998).

Weiss also covered Capitol Hill writing the Capitol Report for The Journal of Long Term Care Administration (later renamed Balance) from 1990 to 1998, and Washington Report for Contemporary Long Term Care from 1986 to 1987. As a journalist, he was accredited by the House Press Gallery (1987, 1988, 1990, 1991) to cover Congress.

In 2025, the James P. Adams Library at Rhode Island College created a collection titled Herbert P. Weiss Papers to house all of Weiss' published articles, reports, newsletters and newspapers he has edited. Covering over 45 years of reporting on health care and medical issues, the collection is available to students and researchers nationwide.

== Books ==
In 2014, Weiss co-edited an e-book with Dr. Nancy Carriuolo, then president of Rhode Island College, detailing the emails of Richard Walton, a well-known Rhode Island social activist.

In 2016, Weiss published a collection of his articles for seniors called Taking Charge: Collected Stories on Aging Boldly.

Weiss has published two sequels of his collected articles, one in 2021 called Taking Charge, Volume 2: More Stories on Aging Boldly

In 2025, Taking Charge, Volume 3: Lots More Stories on Aging Boldly was published.

== Municipal career ==
On January 4, 1999, Weiss was charged by Pawtucket, RI Mayor James E. Doyle with oversight of the city of Pawtucket's newly established 307-acre Arts and Entertainment District. Over the years, he has been a driver of Pawtucket's arts-oriented development strategy. In particular, his efforts to bring artists to the city's historic mill buildings have attracted national attention. Weiss was among those featured by filmmaker Jason Caminiti in Pawtucket Rising, a 2008 documentary.

Weiss was part of the group that created the month-long Pawtucket Arts Festival (PAF) in 1999, and later received its inaugural Medal of Excellence Award in 2015.

Weiss was the first recipient of the non-profit Pawtucket Foundation's Person of the Year award. In 2005, the All Children's Theatre awarded him the Advocacy in the Arts Action Award, and in 2013 he was recognized with an Excellence in Arts and Business award from the Blackstone Valley Tourism Council.

Weiss also serves as the liaison between the city and filmmakers wanting to use Pawtucket as a location in movies, television shows and commercials. For his advocacy and support of the film industry, the non-profit Rhode Island Film Collaborative gave Weiss its first Excellence Award in 2010. In 2016, the Rhode Island International Film Festival recognized his efforts to promote the Rhode Island film industry by awarding him its Producer's Circle Award.

Weiss was also invited by other municipalities around the region to discuss Pawtucket's arts policy and its economic impact on the city. These invitations took him to: Maine - Portland; Pennsylvania – Philadelphia and Oil City: Rhode Island – Providence, Cranston, Newport, and Woonsocket; New York - New York City; New Jersey - Camden and Millville; Massachusetts - New Bedford, Fall River and Rockport.

In September 2022 Weiss was appointed deputy director of Senior Services at the Leon Mathieu Senior Center.

== State appointments ==
Weiss was appointed by five governors to serve on the Rhode Island Advisory Commission on Aging. The appointments were made by Governors Bruce Sundlun (1994), Lincoln Almond (1999, 2000), Donald L. Carcieri (2005), Gina Raimondo (2016), and Daniel J. McKee (2022).

Weiss was appointed by Rhode Island Senate President Dominick J. Ruggerio in November 2021 to serve on the Advisory Council on Alzheimer's Disease Research and Treatment.

== Professional licenses / Certifications ==
Weiss was licensed as a nursing home administrator in Washington, D.C., from 1981 to 1987 and from 1993 to 1999 in Rhode Island.

Weiss is a 2012 graduate of the Theta II Class of Leadership Rhode Island.

== Personal life ==
Weiss is married to Patricia S. Zacks (D’Angelo) of Pawtucket, Rhode Island and has two step children, Ben (born 1983) and Samantha (born 1981). He has lived in Pawtucket since 1995.
