= The Harness Maker's Dream =

The Harness Maker's Dream: Nathan Kallison and the Rise of South Texas
- First edition
- Author: Nick Kotz
- Subject: Nathan Kallison
- Genre: Non-fiction
- Published: October 10, 2005; Texas Christian University Press
- Publication place: U.S.
- Pages: 320
- ISBN: 087565567X

The Harness Maker's Dream: Nathan Kallison and the Rise of South Texas is a 2013 book written by the Pulitzer Prize-winning historian Nick Kotz, published by Texas Christian University Press. It is Kotz' sixth book.

== Synopsis ==
The book is a biographical portrait of Ukrainian immigrant Nathan Kallison and follows Kallison's journey as he flees anti-Semitic Russia and makes his way to the United States. Earning a living as a harness maker, Kallison quickly adapts to his new environment. After moving to San Antonio, Texas in 1899, he builds his one-room saddlery into the largest farm and ranch supply business in the Southwest and — a rarity among Jews in America — becomes a pioneer rancher. The Kallison Ranch shows his tradition-bound neighbors how to prosper by adopting the latest scientific advances in agriculture. At Kallison's Store —an early “big-box’ department store for farmers and ranchers — he meets customers’ needs by selling everything from a wide range of agricultural supplies to furniture for their homes, clothing for their families, and tires for their cars.

== Background ==
The Harness Maker's Dream is based on the life of Kotz' grandfather. For the benefit of readers who are researching the history of Jewish immigrant families in Texas, Kotz has included an index, extensive notes, and a bibliography.
