= James V. Risser =

American journalist

James V. Risser (born 1938) is an American journalist and Emeritus Professor of Communication at Stanford University.

== Career ==
Risser worked for The Des Moines Register for 20 years after which he was a member of the Pulitzer Prize board. He was also the director for Knight Fellowships. He has won two Pulitzer Prizes for National Reporting, one in 1976 and the other in 1979. A Stanford University Prize was named after him, called the "Knight-Risser Prize for Western Environmental Journalism".

== Awards ==
- 1979: Pulitzer Prize for National Reporting "for a series on farming damage to the environment".
- 1977: (with George Anthan) Raymond Clapper Memorial Award "for a story disclosing production of unsanitary meat for the school lunch program."
- 1976: Pulitzer Prize for National Reporting "for disclosing large-scale corruption in the American grain exporting trade".
- 1975: Raymond Clapper Memorial Award
- 1971: Raymond Clapper Memorial Award Honorable Mention
