= Squitieri =

Squitieri is a surname. Notable people with the surname include:

- Arnold Squitieri (1936–2022), American criminal
- Pasquale Squitieri (1938–2017), Italian film director and screenwriter
- Tom Squitieri (born 1953), American journalist, public speaker, and public relations specialist
