= Bert Andrews (journalist) =

American journalist

- Born: Bertrand Albert Andrews Jr. June 2, 1901; Colorado Springs, Colorado, U.S.
- Died: August 21, 1953 (aged 52); Denver, Colorado, U.S.
- Occupation: journalist
- Years active: 1924–1953
- Employer: New York Herald Tribune
- Spouse: Martha Nadine Wright (m. 1928)
- Children: 2 sons
- Relatives: Roberta McCain (sister-in-law); John McCain (nephew)
- Awards: Pulitzer Prize for National Reporting

Bertrand Albert Andrews Jr. (June 2, 1901 – August 21, 1953) was a Washington-based reporter for the New York Herald Tribune who won the Pulitzer Prize in 1948 for his article "A State Department Security Case."

== Background ==
Bertrand Albert ("Bert") Andrews Jr. was born on June 2, 1901, in Colorado Springs. His father was Bertrand A. Andrews and mother Laura Whitaker. When still a boy, the family moved to San Diego. Andrews studied at Stanford University but dropped out in 1924.

== Career ==
In September 1924, Andrews began his career in journalism as a copy boy at The Sacramento Star and then moved to the San Diego Sun, where he stayed until 1927. In 1928, he became a report for William Randolph Hearst's Chicago Herald-Examiner. In 1929, he worked for the Detroit Times. In mid-1929, he joined the New York Herald-Tribune in Paris for six months. He returned to join the New York American through 1937. In October 1937, Andrews rejoined the New York Herald Tribune as a reporter and rewriter through 1941 based in Albany, New York.

On June 2, 1941, Andrews became Washington bureau chief for the Herald Tribune, the position that made him famous (the "number two" newsman in Washington, according to David Halberstam). During World War II, reportage took him to England and into the Pacific Ocean to cover American troops. In 1945, he reported on the first-ever meeting of the United Nations (for which Alger Hiss served as Acting Secretary) in San Francisco. In 1946, he covered the United Nations Assembly meeting in London. He scooped the Yalta vote compact and the resignation of former Secretary of War Henry L. Stimson.

=== Washington Witch Hunt ===
In June 1947, the State Department dismissed ten (10) employees–"none of them of top policy-making rank"–on unspecified grounds of disloyalty, as reported by Joseph Alsop and Stewart Alsop.

On November 2, 1947, Andrews published "A State Department Security Case" in the Herald Tribune after securing a secret transcript. In the article, he described "Mr. Blank," an unnamed State Department official among seven discharged without specific charges. Articles continued for some days almost daily by Andrews. The Washington Post reacted the next day with concern: "Without access to what the FBI reported, there is no way of knowing whether Mr. Blank was a doubtful security risk." In a comment, New Yorker magazine compared Mr. Blank's story to Franz Kafka's book The Trial. In an article co-written by Yale Law School professor Thomas I. Emerson, its journal questioned the propriety of the story by noting: "The courts have never tolerated the failure to produce in open hearing any part of the evidence upon which the deciding official relies in an administrative adjudication requiring a fair hearing" and cited a decision by the U.S. Supreme Court. On November 17, 1947, the State Department reversed its policy. It authorized the seven resignations "without prejudice" and offered the right to appeal before a Loyalty Review Board.

Andrews continued writing on government investigations into Communism. He covered the hearings of the Hollywood Ten, Dr. Edward U. Condon of the Bureau of Standards, and others held by the House Un-American Activities Committee well into 1948. He published the articles in a book called Washington Witch Hunt in June 1948, widely reported by the press.

=== Hiss Case ===
In 1946, Andrews along with James Reston of the New York Times, had recommended Alger Hiss as president of the Carnegie Endowment for International Peace.

Andrews befriended newly elected U.S. Representative Richard M. Nixon (who came into office in January 1947). When Nixon became convinced that Whittaker Chambers was telling the truth to HUAC about Alger Hiss, Andrews was among those whom he consulted for verification and encouragement.

Chambers wrote about Andrews in his 1952 memoir:

Meanwhile, in the course of the whole Hiss Case, not more than five journalists were sent to find out at first hand what I might really be like. Only two of them, Bert Andrews, the chief of the New York Herald Tribune Washington bureau, and Nicholas Blatchford, of the Washington Daily News, proved equal to the assignment.

On August 7, 1953, Andrews was covering U.S. President Dwight D. Eisenhower during a retreat in Denver when he suffered a heart attack.

=== Relationship with Nixon ===
Halberstam wrote that at times Andrews "seemed to be more of a Nixon staff man than a working journalist." Drew Pearson wrote on February 24, 1950, that Andrews had

In 1962, Nixon referred to Andrews in Life magazine as "my friend." President Eisenhower called Andrews a "personal friend" who "always presented news developments fairly and honestly."

== Personal life and death ==
On April 28, 1928, Andrews married Martha Nadine Wright (1903-1979), sister of Roberta McCain (née Wright) and aunt of U.S. Senator John McCain. They had two sons.

On August 21, 1953, Andrews died at age 52 in Denver of a coronary occlusion (blood clot in the heart), following a first a few weeks earlier.

== Awards ==
1945:

- Raymond Clapper Memorial Award

1948:

- Pulitzer Prize for National Reporting
- Heywood Broun Memorial Award
- Page One Award

== Legacy ==
At the height of his influence, Andrews helped African-American journalist Louis Lautier obtain credentials for the Senate Press Gallery.

== Works ==
Andrews published only one book during his lifetime; his son finished a second book for him posthumously:

- Washington Witch Hunt (1948)
- A Tragedy of History: A Journalist's Confidential Role in the Hiss-Chambers Case, with son Peter Andrews (1962)

The Kirkus Reviews for A Tragedy of History reads:

Bert Andrews was the chief of the New York Herald Tribune Washington Bureau... and his book is for the most part a transcript of the long hearings involved in the Hiss case. Andrews has very little to contribute on his own to the famous trial which wavered between perjury and treason and led to discreditization. The publisher's claim that Andrews was "In effect, a trusted confidant and participant" is as unsubstantiated as a great many of the things that went on in this "tragedy of history," a hazy if attention-getting caption. His not so private intelligence of the case seems to be limited to a three-hour interview with Chambers he shared with Nixon. Well, once again, from Hiss as seen by Chambers, and Chambers as seen by Hiss (i.e., the deadbeat Crosley) is the long testimony from the time when Chambers first appeared before the House Committee on American Activities, through the hearings, the libel suit, the indictment and the two trials. These annals have been previously and more fully recorded; Andrews concentrates on the Ford car and the pumpkin papers, skimps on the Woodstock typewriter and the prothonotary warbler. He has no opinions nor conclusions to offer–leaves it in its continuum of contradiction and supposition (to Andrews the mystery is not why Hiss went to jail, but how he managed to stay out for so long). This hardly seems to warrant its revival now particularly in view of the stimulating interpretations which have appeared from Alistair Cooke's version shortly after the proceedings to Fred Cook's more recent re-examination (1958).

== See also ==
- Richard Nixon
- Alger Hiss
- Whittaker Chambers
- Edward U. Condon

== External sources ==
- Meet the Press (May 17, 1953): Martha Rountree with James Wechsler, Marquis Childs, Frank Waldrop, Bert Andrews, and Lawrence Spivak.
- Black, Conrad (2007). Richard Nixon: A Life in Full. Perseus Books. p. 109. ISBN 9780786727032.
- Chambers, Whittaker (1952). Witness. New York: Random House. pp. 626–627. ISBN 978-0-394-45233-3. LCCN 52005149.
- Mattews, Chris (1996). Kennedy & Nixon: The Rivalry that Shaped Postwar America. Simon & Schuster. p. 62. ISBN 9781439135310.
- Nixon, Richard (16 March 1962). Bitter Ordeal for a Man to Bare His Soul. Life. p. 127.
