= Nationalism in Lenin (Trotsky) =

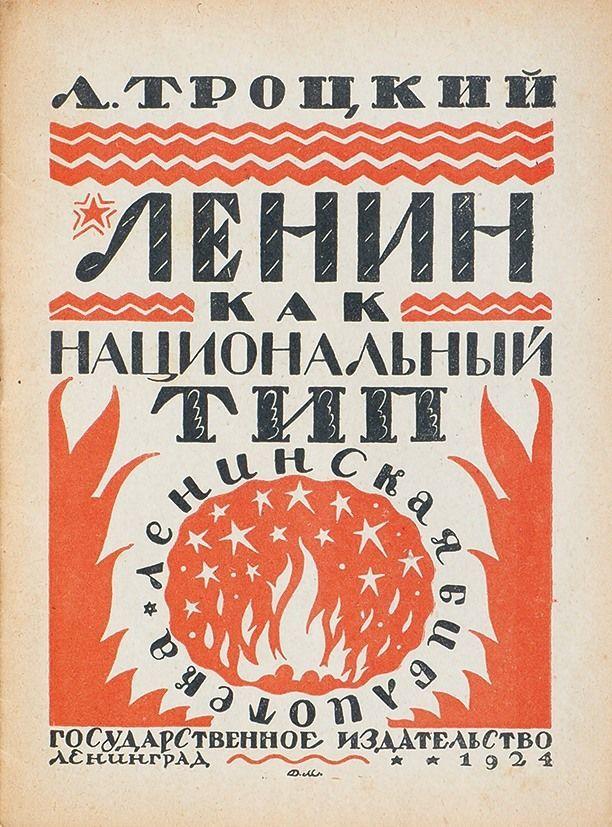
Russian edition (1924)

"Nationalism in Lenin" (Russian: Ленин как национальный тип, Lenin as a national type) was an article, written by Leon Trotsky in 1920 for the 50th birthday of Vladimir Lenin, and published in the soviet newspaper "Pravda". It contains the author's reflections on the personality and character of the founder of the Bolshevik Party. In 1924, due to the death of Lenin, the text was issued as a separate pamphlet, and also reprinted in Trotsky's book "Lenin" (Russian: О Ленине, About Lenin).

== Literature ==
- Barzun J. M. Book Reviews: Lenin, by Trotsky // Columbia Daily Spectator. — 1925. — 14 August (vol. XLIX, no. 183). — P. 4
- Фельштинский Ю., Чернявский Г. «Уроки Октября» и «литературная дискуссия» (in Russian) // Лев Троцкий. Книга 3. Оппозиционер. 1923—1929 гг. — М.: ЗАО Издательство Центрполиграф, 2013. — С. [49]. — 464 с. — ISBN 978-5-227-04064-0.
- Булдаков В. П. 1917 год: Лица, личины и лики революции (in Russian) // Россия и современный мир : журнал / ИНИОН РАН. — 2017. — No. 1 (94). — P. 6—20. — ISSN 1726-5223.
