= Adam Liptak =

American journalist and lawyer

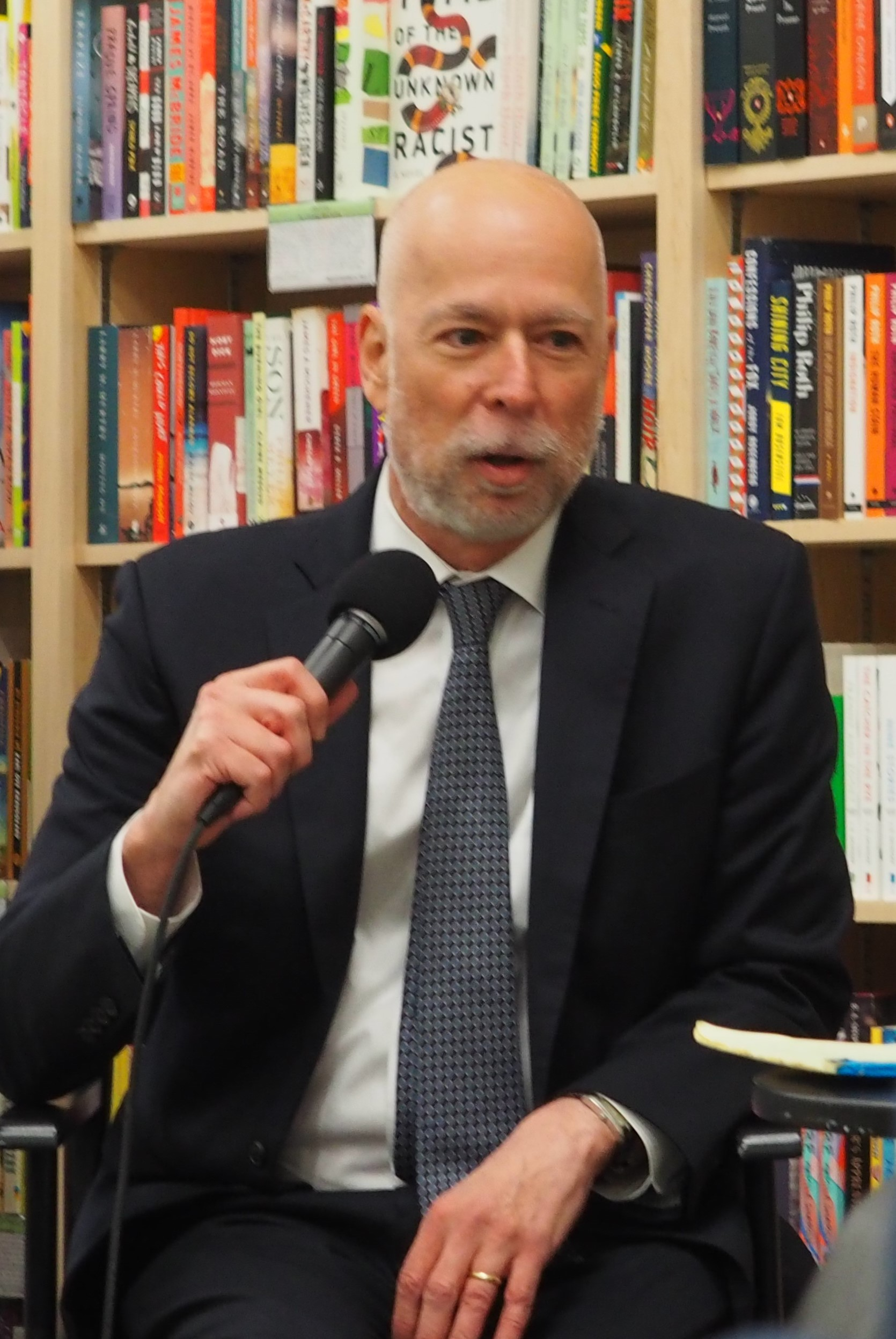
- Liptak in 2019
- Born: September 2, 1960 (age 65); Stamford, Connecticut, U.S.
- Education: Yale University (BA, JD)
- Occupation: Journalist
- Years active: 2002–present

Adam Liptak (born September 2, 1960) is an American journalist, lawyer and instructor in law and journalism. He is the Chief Legal Affairs Correspondent for The New York Times.

Liptak has written for The New Yorker, Vanity Fair, Rolling Stone, The New York Observer, Business Week and other publications. He was a finalist for the Pulitzer Prize for Explanatory Journalism in 2009 for a series of articles that examined ways in which the American legal system differs from those of other developed nations.

== Early life and education ==
Liptak was born in Stamford, Connecticut. He first joined The New York Times as a copyboy in 1984 after graduating cum laude from Yale University, where he was an editor of the Yale Daily News, with a degree in English. In addition to clerical work and fetching coffee, he assisted the reporter M. A. Farber in covering the trial of a libel suit brought by General William Westmoreland against CBS.

He returned to Yale for a J.D. degree, graduating from Yale Law School in 1988. During law school, Liptak worked as a summer clerk in The New York Times Company's legal department. After graduating, he spent four years at Cahill Gordon & Reindel, a New York City law firm, as a litigation associate specializing in First Amendment matters.

In 1992, he returned to The New York Times Company's legal department. Liptak spent a decade advising The New York Times and the company's other newspapers, television stations and new media properties on defamation, privacy, news gathering and related issues and frequently litigated media and commercial cases.

== Career ==
Liptak joined The New York Times news staff in 2002 as its national legal correspondent. He covered the Supreme Court nominations of John Roberts and Samuel Alito; the investigation into the disclosure of the identity of Valerie Plame, an undercover Central Intelligence Agency operative; the trial of John Lee Malvo, one of the Washington-area snipers; judicial ethics; and various aspects of the criminal justice system, including capital punishment. He inaugurated the Sidebar column in January 2007. The column covered and considered developments in the law until its final edition, published February 2, 2026.

In 2005, he examined the rise in life sentences in the U.S. in a three-part series. The next year, Liptak and two colleagues studied connections between contributions to the campaigns of justices on the Ohio Supreme Court and those justices' voting records. He was a member of the teams that examined the reporting of Jayson Blair and Judith Miller at The New York Times, in 2003 and 2005, respectively.

He began covering the Supreme Court in 2008. He followed Linda Greenhouse, who had covered the Supreme Court for nearly 30 years. In February 2026, he left his role as Supreme Court Correspondent to become the Times' Chief Legal Affairs Correspondent. He now writes a New York Times newsletter, The Docket.

Liptak has served as the chairman of the New York City Bar Association’s communications and media law committee and was a member of the board of the Media Law Resource Center.

He has taught courses on media law and the Supreme Court at Columbia University Graduate School of Journalism, UCLA School of Law, University of Chicago Law School, University of Southern California's Gould School of Law, and Yale Law School.

Liptak's work has appeared in The New Yorker, Vanity Fair, Rolling Stone, The New York Observer, Business Week, and The American Lawyer. He has written several law review articles on First Amendment topics. Liptak was also featured in The Harvard Crimson's 2014 commencement issue with his column entitled "Please Calculate Badly." In 2013, he published an e-book, To Have and Uphold: The Supreme Court and the Struggle for Same-Sex Marriage.

== Awards ==
In 1995, Presstime magazine named him one of 20 leading newspaper professionals under the age of 40. In 1999, he received the New York Press Club's John Peter Zenger award for "defending and advancing the cause of a free press". In 2006, the same group awarded him its Crystal Gavel award for his journalistic work.

He was a finalist for the Pulitzer Prize for Explanatory Reporting in 2009, and he won the 2010 Scripps Howard Raymond Clapper Award for Washington Reporting for a five-part series on the Roberts Court.

Stetson University awarded Liptak an honorary doctor of laws degree in 2014, and Hofstra University presented him with its Presidential Medal in 2008. He is a member of the American Academy of Arts and Sciences.

== Personal life ==
Liptak lives in Washington, D.C., with his wife, Jennifer Bitman, a veterinarian, and their children, Katie and Ivan.
