= Frederick William Holls =

American lawyer

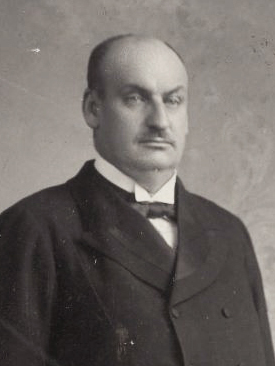
- Born: George Frederick William Holls; July 1, 1857; Zelienople, Pennsylvania, U.S.
- Died: July 23, 1903 (aged 46); Yonkers, New York, U.S.
- Education: Columbia University (BA, LLB)
- Occupation: Lawyer
- Political party: Republican Party
- Relatives: Frederick C. Sayles (father-in-law)

George Frederick William Holls (July 1, 1857 – July 23, 1903) was an American lawyer, publicist, and Secretary of the United States delegation to the Hague Peace Conference.

== Biography ==
Holls was born in Zelienople, Pennsylvania, on July 1, 1857. His father, George Charles Holls, was a German immigrant and Lutheran minister from Darmstadt who settled in Ohio in 1851 and served as the founding director of the Wartburg Orphanage, the first Lutheran orphanage in the United States.

He graduated from Columbia College in 1878 and Columbia Law School in 1880. At Columbia, he co-founded the student newspaper, Columbia Daily Spectator, and served as first editor.

After being admitted to the New York bar, Holls represented the German government in important matters and started his own law practice named Holls, Wagner & Burghard, building his clientele among those of German descent.

Holls was active in Republican Party affairs. He was also appointed Secretary of the United States delegation to the Hague Peace Conference and was one of the American delegates to the Committee on Arbitration, which led to the creation of the Permanent Court of Arbitration. He was a delegate to the 1894 New York State Constitutional Convention.

== Personal life and family ==
Holls was married to Caroline M. Sayles, daughter of Pawtucket, Rhode Island mayor Frederick Clark Sayles, who was a descendent of Thomas Olney and Roger Williams, founders of the Colony of Rhode Island and Providence Plantations. He died on July 23, 1903, at his home in Yonkers, New York at age 46.
