= Richard J. Walton =

American politician

- Born: May 24, 1928; Saratoga Springs, New York
- Died: December 27, 2012; Providence, Rhode Island
- Education: Classical High School, Providence, RI (1945) Brown University, Providence, RI (B.A. 1951) Columbia University Graduate School of Journalism, New York, NY (M.A. 1954)
- Occupations: Journalist, College Professor
- Known for: Progressive activism against poverty, homelessness, and hunger
- Spouse: Margaret Hilton (divorced) Mary Una Jones (divorced)
- Children: Richard (1958) Catherine (1960)

Richard Walton (May 24, 1928 – December 27, 2012) was an American writer, teacher, and politician. He was the vice-presidential nominee in 1984 of the short-lived Citizens Party; Sonia Johnson was the party's presidential nominee that year.

== Personal life and education ==
Richard John Walton was born on May 24, 1928, in Saratoga Springs, New York, to Gertrude and Richard James Walton. As a child he moved with his family to Providence, Rhode Island, where he was graduated from Classical High School in 1945 and received a bachelor's degree from Brown University in 1951. His studies at Brown were interrupted for two years while he served in the U.S. Navy as a journalist's mate. He worked as a disc jockey on Providence radio station WICE before attending the Columbia Graduate School of Journalism where he received a master's degree in 1954.

He was married twice, once to Margaret Hilton and subsequently to Mary Una Jones; both marriages ended in divorce. He has two children, Richard (born 1958) and Catherine (born 1960). He returned to reside in his home state of Rhode Island since 1981.

Walton died at age 84 of leukemia on December 27, 2012, at Rhode Island Hospital in Providence, RI.

== Journalistic career ==
As a print journalist, he worked for The Providence Journal (1954–1955) and then for the New York World-Telegram and The Sun (1955–1959). He then returned to radio for the Voice of America (VOA), first in Washington, D.C., as producer-host of Report to Africa (1959–1962) and then in New York City as principal United Nations correspondent (1962–1967). In 1960, he traveled extensively in Africa making a series of documentaries on the independence movement, interviewing many of the post-colonial leaders including Patrice Lumumba.

In 1967 he left VOA to write his first book, The Remnants of Power: The Tragic Last Years of Adlai Stevenson (1968). Eleven other books followed, notably America and the Cold War (1969), The United States and Latin America (1971, ISBN 0-8164-3074-8), Cold War and Counterrevolution: The Foreign Policy of John F. Kennedy (1972, ISBN 0-14-021627-8), Henry Wallace, Harry Truman and the Cold War (1976, ISBN 0-670-36859-8), The Power of Oil (1979, ISBN 0-8164-3186-8), and The United States and the Far East (1979, ISBN 0-395-28931-9). He has contributed articles to numerous publications, including The New York Times, The Washington Post, The Nation, The New Republic, Saturday Review, Cosmopolitan, and Playboy. He was an early member of the National Book Critics Circle.

== Teaching career ==
After leaving the VOA in 1967, Walton began teaching writing, political science, and history at Housatonic Community College in Stratford, Connecticut, The New School for Social Research in New York City, and what is now Western Connecticut State University in Danbury. He traveled to more than 50 countries, including teaching English in an elementary school in Shanghai in the summer of 2007.

For over a quarter of a century until 2012, he taught at Rhode Island College where he was among the leaders of a campaign to unionize adjunct faculty. In an election in April 2007, the adjunct faculty voted by an overwhelming margin to unionize and affiliate with the American Federation of Teachers. He served on the union's negotiating committee, agreeing an initial contract with the college and Rhode Island Board of Governors for Higher Education, which was ratified in October 2009. He was elected as the union's first president and served until his death. Rhode Island College lowered its flag to half-staff in his memory. In May 2013, the college honored Walton with the Special Award for Distinguished Service to Alumni, in Memoriam.

== Political and community activism ==
Involved from 1980 with the Citizens Party of environmentalist Barry Commoner, Walton was the party's vice-presidential candidate in 1984 on a ticket headed by feminist Sonia Johnson as the party's presidential candidate. (Johnson's running mate on the Peace and Freedom Party ticket that year was Emma Wong Mar, however). Walton had been interested in political third parties since at least the publication of his book on the subject, Henry Wallace, Harry Truman and the Cold War. Interviewed in 2008, Walton joked about his 1984 campaign for vice-president, "I don't think I attracted quite as much attention as Sarah Palin."

He went on to become one of the early members of the Green Party of Rhode Island. In the 1996 presidential election in Rhode Island he was temporarily a stand-in candidate for Ralph Nader's official running mate Winona LaDuke. In the 2004 presidential election, he endorsed Green Party presidential candidate David Cobb. He served on several national Green bodies.

Walton became well known as an activist against poverty, homelessness, and hunger. He served as president of Amos House, which is the state's largest soup kitchen, and on the boards of a number of non-profit and social service organizations, including the George Wiley Center (advocates for the poor), the Rhode Island Coalition for the Homeless, and the Slater Mill Historic Site. With the Providence-Niquinohomo Sister City Project he had been to Nicaragua many times where the project built a health center and a school, and he twice served on medical teams in Guatemala.

Every year for his own birthday from 1988 to 2011, Walton hosted a substantial charitable fundraiser at his home that was typically attended by several hundred people, including sitting and former governors, senators, congressional representatives, and media personalities who were in some cases his former students. The party was held for the first time at another venue in 2012.

Walton has received the Sister Carol McGovern Award of the Rhode Island Coalition for the Homeless for his work with the homeless and the John Kiffney Award of the Providence Newspaper Guild for his service to the community.

Involved with the non-profit folk music venue Stone Soup Coffee House for 30 years, he was the first president of its parent organization, the Stone Soup Folk Arts Foundation, and served for 15 years. After a hiatus of many years, he had been returned to office and was serving as president at the time of his death. In April 2016 Walton was posthumously inducted into the Rhode Island Music Hall of Fame (RIMHOF).

In 2008 at the age of 80, Walton was profiled and interviewed as part of a major feature article in The Providence Phoenix about prominent people in Rhode Island.

In 2018 an e-book of selected correspondence by Walton was edited by Herbert Weiss & Nancy Carriuolo and published to commemorate Walton's life and activism.

Preceded by La Donna Harris	Citizens Party vice presidential candidate 1984	Succeeded by none
