= Paulina Mangubat =

American political strategist

- Born: 1995 (age 30–31); Phoenix, Arizona, U.S.
- Education: Barnard College
- Occupation: Political strategist
- Employer: Democratic National Committee
- Title: Deputy chief mobilization officer of the DNC
- Political party: Democratic Party

Paulina Mangubat (born 1995) is a Filipina-American political strategist who serves as the deputy chief mobilization officer of the Democratic National Committee. She is responsible for operating the official account of Democratic Party on social media platform X (formerly twitter). Mangubat previously served as digital director for Michelle Wu's 2021 Boston mayoral campaign.

== Background and education ==
Paulina Mangubat is 30 years old and was born in 1995. She was born in Phoenix, Arizona, to first-generation Chinese-Filipino American parents. Mangubat graduated Barnard College in 2017 with degree in political science and East Asian studies. In a May 2022 interview with the college, Mangubat said she felt like an "alien" attending schools where the majority of students were white. This inspired her to advocate for inclusive policies in the United States.

== Career ==
In 2017, Paulina Mangubat, writing for Bwog, stated that she previously was a editor for student newspaper Columbia Daily Spectator and co-president of Columbia University's Asian Pacific American Heritage Month. Mangubat worked for Politico as an advertising operations employee. In 2018, she worked for Democratic Congressional Campaign Committee as a digital strategy employee. She worked as a digital advertising consultant for nonprofit Voto Latino and the political campaigns of Adam Schiff, John Hickenlooper, Jon Tester and other Democratic politicians. Reportedly, Mangubat was also a designer, photographer and a videographer.

In February 2021, Mangubat moved to Boston to participate in the 2021 Boston mayoral election as a digital director for Michelle Wu's mayoral campaign. In a podcast, Mangubat said that she started remotely working for Wu's campaign in January 2021. Her work consisted of making TikTok videos and writing Tweets. One of the videos received 180,000 views.

On January 12, 2022, Michelle Wu appointed Mangubat as Boston's digital director, reporting to Chief Communications Officer Jessicah Pierre. Michelle Wu praised her as a "creative genius" while Pierre said that her passion for "building community digitally" is "unmatched". In her May 2022 interview with Barnard College, Mangubat stated that she moved to Washington, D.C. to work for advertising firm AL Media. She has created political television and digital content for various clients, such as senator Raphael Warnock.

In June 2025, Slate magazine interviewed Mangubat and revealed that she became digital content and creative director of Democratic National Committee. Mangubat is a member of a team that operates the official account of Democratic Party on the social network X, "@TheDemocrats". The team, which Mangubat said is made up primarily Gen-Z people, posts political memes about Republican officials. In October 2025 interview with Puck, Mangubat said that team under her leadership made political videos on TikTok for DNC-affiliated account "FactPostNews".

By May 2026, Mangubat served as deputy chief mobilization officer of the DNC. Mangubat's LinkedIn page said that she was no longer digital content and creative director.

== Controversy ==
In May 2026, security advisor Stephen Miller posted a tweet on X claiming that Democratic nominee for Texas senate James Talarico is a transgender man. The official account of the Democratic Party later responded to his post with the comment: “shut up you ugly fuck”. The response immediately sparked controversy online among right-wing figures and was viewed by more than forty million users. The controversial comment was made by Paulina Mangubat with the approval of the DNC.

Miller's wife, Katie Miller, later identified Mangubat as the author of the comment and posted a picture of Mangubat on X, stating: “Paulina Mangubat is who runs @TheDemocrats account. She’s 30, unmarried with no kids. Put your name on it next time. This is what a sad, unhappy, female Liberal looks like”. In response Mangubat posted a picture of herself in a wedding dress on X, saying that she is planning to get married. Katie Miller said to Fox News that Mangubat's comment calling Miller an "ugly fuck" was a "violent political rhetoric".
