= Gerald M. Pomper =

American political scientist (1935–2026)

Gerald Pomper
- Born: April 2, 1935; New York City, U.S.
- Died: May 21, 2026 (aged 91); New Brunswick, New Jersey, U.S.

Academic background
- Education: Columbia University (BA); Princeton University (PhD)

Academic work
- Discipline: Political science
- Institutions: City College of New York; Rutgers University

Gerald M. Pomper (April 2, 1935 – May 21, 2026) was an American political scientist and specialist in American elections and politics. Pomper was the Board of Governors Professor Emeritus of Political Science at the Eagleton Institute of Politics of Rutgers University.

== Life and career ==
Pomper was born in The Bronx, New York City, on April 2, 1935, to Jewish immigrants from Poland. He grew up in Manhattan and graduated from Stuyvesant High School. He received his BA from Columbia University in 1955 on a Ford Foundation scholarship, majoring in political science and serving as managing editor of Columbia Daily Spectator. He then received his PhD from Princeton University.

He began his academic career at the City College of New York, before moving to Rutgers University and served as the founding chair of the political science department of Livingston College. He was a Fulbright scholar from 1971–1972, teaching at Tel Aviv University.

Pomper has been described as a leading authority in the field of election studies and was called the "Dean of American Political Science" by political historian Allan Lichtman.

Pomper died in New Brunswick, New Jersey, on May 21, 2026, at the age of 91.
