= James Polk (journalist) =

American journalist (1937–2021)

- Born: James Ray Polk; September 12, 1937; Oaktown, Indiana, U.S.
- Died: July 15, 2021 (aged 83); Marietta, Georgia, U.S.
- Education: Indiana University Bloomington
- Occupation: Journalist
- Years active: 1962–2021
- Awards: Pulitzer Prize (1974); Raymond Clapper Memorial Award (1971, 1973)

James Ray Polk (September 12, 1937 – July 15, 2021) was an American journalist, known for his investigative reporting and coverage of American political corruption and fraud. Over the course of his career, he covered the Raymond Donovan investigations, the Bert Lance controversy, the Abscam scandal, and the financial dealings of John Zaccaro, husband of 1984 Democratic vice presidential nominee Geraldine Ferraro.

In 1971 and 1973, Polk won the Raymond Clapper Memorial Award for his Washington reporting for the now-defunct Washington, DC, newspaper The Washington Star. In 1974, he won the Pulitzer Prize for National Reporting for his coverage of the Watergate scandal for the Star.

== Biography ==
Polk was born in Oaktown, Indiana in 1937, and at the age of eight he wrote about sports for the local paper, the Oaktown Press. After three years in the United States Navy, he attended Indiana University Bloomington where he was a member of Phi Kappa Psi and received his bachelor's degree in government in 1964. He worked as a political staff writer for the Bloomington-based Herald-Telephone, and received the American Political Science Award. He moved to the Associated Press in 1962, and later joined the Washington Star in 1971.

Polk covered the Watergate scandal extensively and received the Pulitzer Prize for his reportage in 1974. The following year, he joined NBC News and covered political corruption and crimes. His most famous stories include Abscam, the racketeering case against Ferdinand and Imelda Marcos, and the Iran-Contra affair. Polk left NBC in 1992 and joined CNN as a senior documentary producer. He died at his home in Marietta, Georgia, on July 15, 2021, at the age of 83.
