= Jerry Landauer =

American investigative journalist (1932–1981)

- Born: January 16, 1932; Stuttgart, Germany
- Died: February 24, 1981 (aged 49); Washington, D.C.
- Education: Columbia University
- Occupation: journalist
- Employer: The Wall Street Journal
- Awards: Worth Bingham Prize (1973)

Jerry G. Landauer (January 16, 1932 – February 24, 1981) was an American investigative journalist with The Wall Street Journal.

== Biography ==
Landauer was born in Stuttgart, Germany on January 16, 1932, and his family emigrated to the United States in 1938 and settled in Ridgewood, Queens. He attended Brooklyn Technical High School and Columbia College, where he graduated Phi Beta Kappa in 1953. He was also elected editor-in-chief of the school newspaper, Columbia Daily Spectator. He then spent a year studying German politics at the University of Bonn and University of Berlin.

He began his newspaper career in The Washington Post and moved to United Press International in 1960, before joining the Washington, D.C. bureau of The Wall Street Journal in 1962.

From 1968 onwards, he began to work on a series of exposes on Spiro Agnew, since he was picked as Richard Nixon's running mate. He reported on Aug. 7, 1973, that Agnew was being investigated for allegations of accepting bribes and filing fraudulent tax returns, which led to the Vice President's resignation on Oct. 10, 1973.

He received the Drew Pearson prize and the Worth Bingham Prize for disclosing the Justice Department investigation (which resulted in the resignation of Agnew). He also received a Raymond Clapper Memorial Award from the American Society of News Editors, and an award from the Society of Professional Journalists for his work as a Washington correspondent.

Landauer died on February 24, 1981, of a heart attack at age 49 in the George Washington University Hospital.
