= List of mayors of Pawtucket, Rhode Island =

The following is a list of mayors of the city of Pawtucket, Rhode Island, United States.

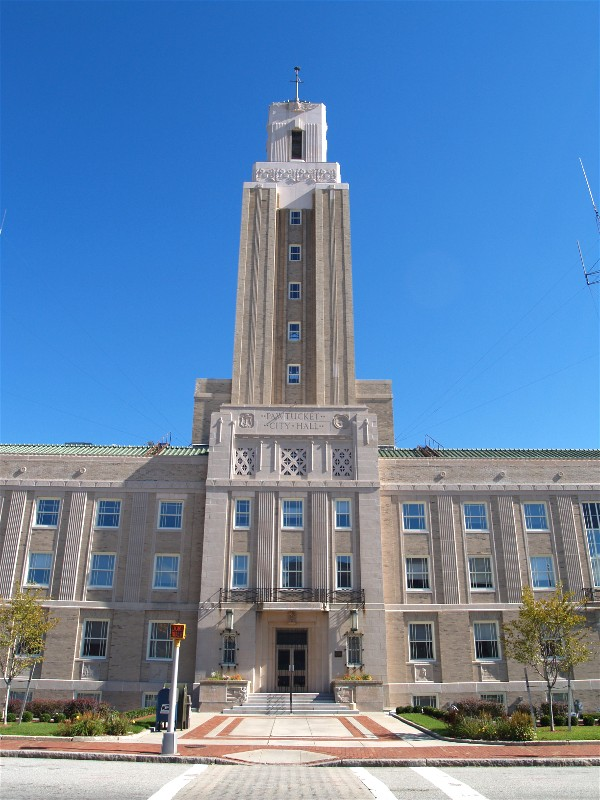
City hall building in Pawtucket, Rhode Island (photo 2007)

- Frederick C. Sayles, 1886–1887
- Almon K. Goodwin, 1888–1889, 1891
- Hugh J. Carrol, 1890, 1892
- James Brown, 1893
- Henry E. Tiepke, 1894–1896
- John W. Davis, 1896–1897
- John J. Fitzgerald, 1900–1902
- James H. Higgins, 1903–1906
- Robert A. Kenyon, 1907–1910, 1919–1922
- Giles William Easterbrooks, c.1911–1916
- Charles H. Holt, c.1931
- John F. Quinn, 1932–1936
- Thomas P. McCoy, 1937–1945
- Lawrence McCarthy, 1950–1951
- Charles F. Reynolds, 1953
- L. A. McCarthy, c.1954
- Robert F. Burns, 1966–1972
- John J. Coleman, c.1973
- Dennis M. Lynch, 1973–1981
- William F. Harty Jr., 1981–1982
- Henry S. Kinch, 1982–1987
- Brian J. Sarault, 1987–1991
- Raymond W. Houle, c.1991
- Robert E. Metivier, 1992–1998
- James E. Doyle, 1998–2011
- Donald R. Grebien, 2011–present
- Adam L. Greenman, Current mayor elect

== See also ==
- Pawtucket City Hall
- Pawtucket history
