= Susan Feeney =

American journalist

Susan Feeney is a partner at GMMB, Inc., a communications, advocacy and political consulting firm. She co-leads the firm's strategic communications work on education reform and policy advocacy. Prior to joining GMMB, Feeney worked at NPR as supervising senior editor of two of its flagship news magazines: Morning Edition from 2000 to 2004 and All Things Considered from 2004 to 2009. Feeney joined NPR as a political journalist.

== Journalism career ==
Feeney started her journalism career in the early 1980s at The Times-Picayune in New Orleans as the city hall and courts reporter. She later covered the Louisiana delegation, politics, and policy, including the 1988 Presidential campaign and the Republican Convention in New Orleans, as the newspaper's Washington bureau reporter. Feeney continued to cover Washington and national politics through the late 1990s for The Dallas Morning News, holding various posts as Washington bureau reporter, White House reporter, and national political reporter. As such, she covered the Texas delegation, Congress, the Supreme Court, the Bill Clinton presidency and impeachment, presidential campaigns, and a range of domestic and international politics. Her investigative reporting garnered numerous awards. Her series “Hidden Danger: The Debate Over Land Mines” won the Texas Katie Award for Government Reporting, and her 1995 series co-written by Steve McGonigle, “Voting Rights: The Next Generation,” won the Raymond Clapper Award for Washington Reporting and the National Association of Black Journalists Award for enterprise reporting, and was a finalist for the Harvard University Goldsmith Prize for Investigative Reporting.

As a senior editor at NPR, Feeney edited award-winning work, including the 2008 special series “The York Project: Race & The ’08 Vote,” which examined racial attitudes during the 2008 presidential race (the series won the 2009 Alfred I. duPont–Columbia University Award); coverage of the September 11 terrorist attacks and the Iraq war, which won Peabody Awards; and breaking news coverage of the Chengdu, China, earthquake, which won the Alfred I. duPont–Columbia University Award among others. Feeney oversaw the NPR Presidential Debate in 2007 as the executive producer of the live two-hour debate from Des Moines. In 2004, she conceived and edited the NPR's 2004 Presidential Candidate Debate, which was the first radio-only forum in more than four decades.

In the wake Hurricane Katrina's devastation in 2005, Feeney co-founded Friends of The Times Picayune, a relief fund that raised nearly $400,000 for employees of the newspaper and their families. She wrote and lectured about disaster reporting and the city's recovery.

== Work at GMMB ==
Feeney joined the firm in 2010 and leads the Seattle office At GMMB, Feeney provides strategic counsel to nonprofit clients such as the Bill & Melinda Gates Foundation, the James Irvine Foundation, the Smarter Balanced Assessment Consortium, the Centers for Disease Control and Prevention, and others.

== Personal life and education ==
Feeney was raised in Pittsburgh, Pennsylvania and lives in Seattle, Washington. She earned her bachelor's degree in 1983 in Newspaper journalism with a minor in political science at Syracuse University's S.I. Newhouse School of Public Communications, where she was named a University Scholar.

She has two children, Jackson Lawrence Hirsh and Coby Marshall Hirsh. Jackson is an American singer-songwriter known as Rence.
