= M. Gregg Bloche =

American legal scholar and psychiatrist

- Awards: Guggenheim Award (2005)

Academic background
- Education: Columbia University (BA); Yale University (JD, MD)

Academic work
- Discipline: Public health policy
- Institutions: Georgetown University

Maxwell Gregg Bloche is an American legal scholar and psychiatrist. He is the Carmack Waterhouse Professor of Health Law, Policy at the Georgetown University Law Center.

== Biography ==
Bloche received his B.A. from Columbia University, where he was editor-in-chief of Columbia Daily Spectator, J.D. from Yale Law School, and M.D. from Yale School of Medicine. He completed a residency in psychiatry at Columbia-Presbyterian Medical Center in New York.

Bloche's scholarship has focused on healthcare systems, healthcare policy, doctor-patient relationship, and medical ethics. He received a Guggenheim Fellowship in 2005 to write the book The Hippocratic Myth: Why Doctors Are Under Pressure to Ration Care, Practice Politics, and Compromise Their Promise to Heal, where he argued that the ethical doctrine of Hippocrates is becoming increasingly at odds with the role played by medical practitioners and policymakers as their power and authority grow in society.
