= Pawtucket Rising =

- DVD Cover
- Directed by: Jason Caminiti
- Produced by: Inside Out Radio Pictures
- Music by: Francisco J. Rodríguez
- Release dates: September 21, 2008 (Pawtucket Film Festival); January 22, 2009 (United States)
- Running time: 53 minutes
- Country: United States
- Language: English

Pawtucket Rising is a 2008 documentary film directed and produced by Jason Caminiti.

The film tells the decade-long story of how the city of Pawtucket, Rhode Island revitalized itself and became known as "Rhode Island's Creative Community."

== Plot ==
Using firsthand discussions with the primary proponents of the revitalization of Pawtucket, the film shows a community coming together behind the arts. The film shows new uses for historic mills, now being used as artists work and living spaces. An historic national guard armory is saved from decades of decay by a small theater company called the Sandra Feinstein-Gamm Theatre. Alongside the Gamm Theater, is a new arts centric high school called the Jacqueline Walsh High School for the Performing Arts. Pawtucket has also brought in other arts organizations from the Providence area, like the Foundry Artists Association. When the owners of the Foundry in Providence wanted to convert their building to living space, the working artists were displaced. They were invited to Pawtucket, and have been exhibiting once a year for two weeks near the holiday season. The revival effort was spearheaded by Mayor James Doyle and Herb Weiss, Pawtucket's Economic and Cultural Affairs Officer.

Pawtucket has also had success with a decade old Pawtucket Arts Festival, held annually at the Slater Mill. The month-long arts festival now has a film festival, musical performances, open studies, Philharmonic in the park, as well as many other events.

The film has shown on PBS.

It includes interviews with

- Gail Ahlers
- Bob Billington
- Bill Chisolm
- Linda Dewing
- Gretchen Dow-Simpson
- James Doyle
- Anthony Estrella
- Ann Galligan
- Deborah Goldhaft
- John Haidemenos
- J. Hogue
- Steve Kidd
- Janice Kissinger
- Steve Kumins
- Len Lavoie
- Luke Mandle
- John Mitchell
- Morris Nathanson
- Mimo Gordon Riley
- Nick Steffey
- Herb Weiss
- Ron Wierks
- Patricia Zacks
