= Frederick C. Sayles =

American entrepreneur (1835–1903)

Frederick Clark Sayles
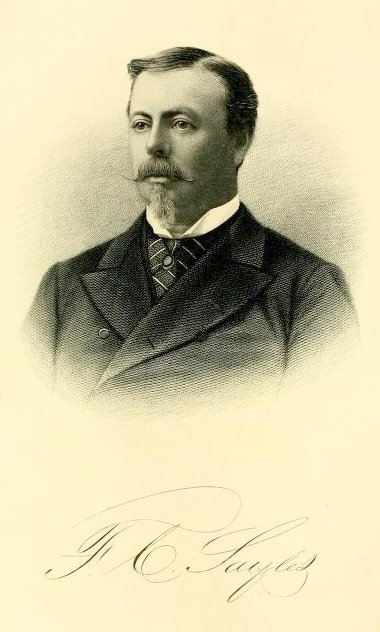

First Mayor of Pawtucket, Rhode Island
- In office 1885–1887

Personal details
- Born: July 17, 1835
- Died: June 5, 1903 (aged 67) Pawtucket, Rhode Island, US
- Resting place: Swan Point Cemetery
- Spouse: Deborah Cook Sayles
- Relations: Frederick William Holls (son-in-law)
- Profession: Businessman

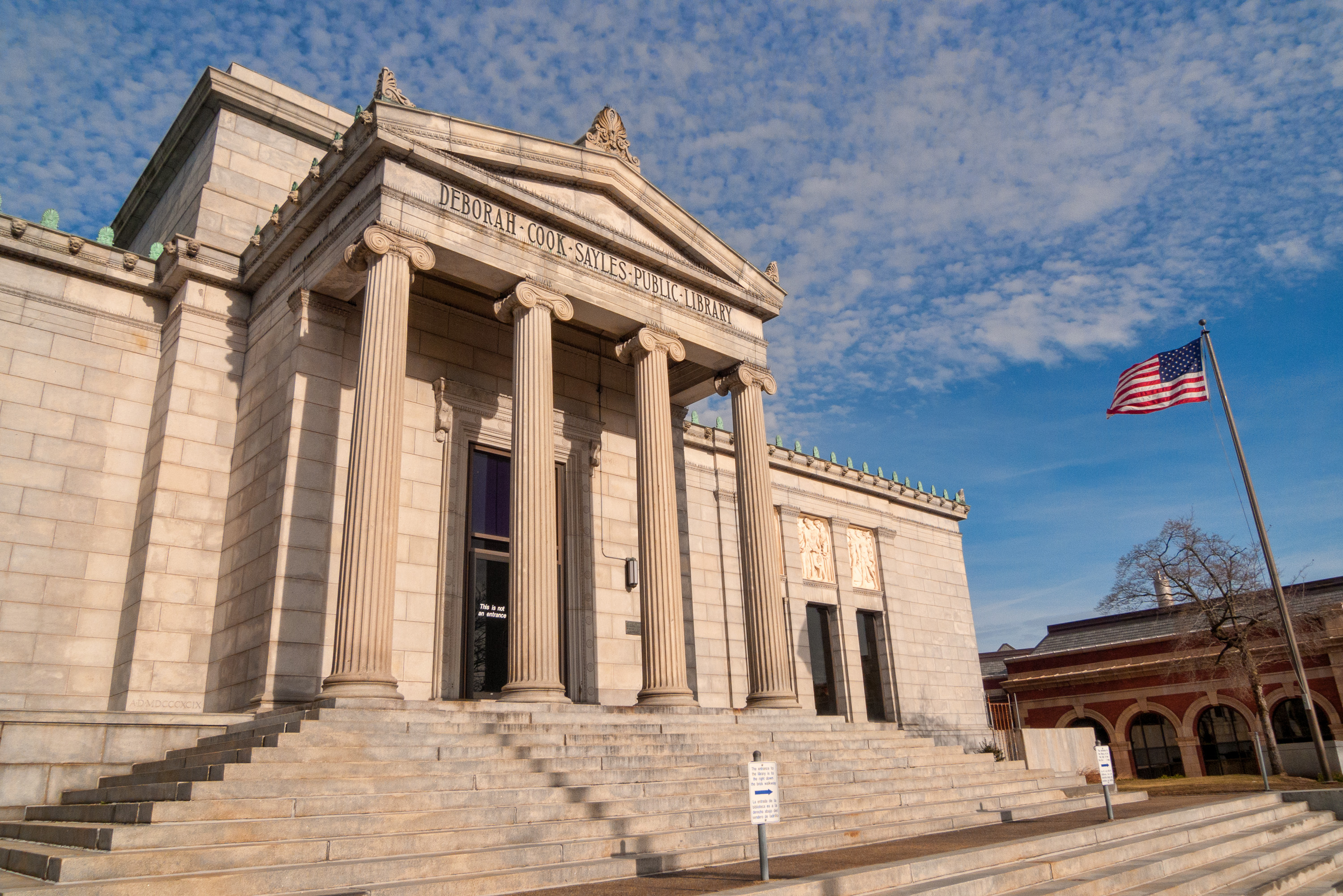
The Deborah Cook Sayles Public Library

Frederick Clark Sayles (July 17, 1835 – June 5, 1903) was an American entrepreneur and the first mayor of Pawtucket, Rhode Island in 1885.

== Career ==
He began working in his brother's Sayles Bleacheries in 1853, and eventually became a partner in the business. Saylesville, Rhode Island is named for his family. He bought the Hearthside farm in Lincoln, Rhode Island in 1901. At this property, he raised prized Broodmare horses.

He was very involved in the Central Congregational Church in Providence, Rhode Island.

== Personal life ==
He married Debra Cook Wilcox and had three children. After the death of his wife, Sayles donated a plot of land for the construction of a public library in Pawtucket. The Deborah Cook Sayles Public Library opened in 1902 and is on the National Register of Historic Places. His daughter, Deborah Wilcox Hill and her husband Fred B Hill, contributed to the construction of the Sayles-Hill men's gymnasium (later turned student center) at Carleton College in Northfield, Minnesota, named in Sayles' honor in 1910. His other daughter, Caroline M. Sayles, married Frederick William Holls, a lawyer and diplomat who served as the Secretary of the United States Delegation to the Hague Conventions of 1899 and 1907.

== See also ==
- List of mayors of Pawtucket, Rhode Island
