= Beverly Weintraub =

American journalist

- Education: Barnard College
- Occupations: Journalist; Executive Editor; Author
- Known for: 2007 Pulitzer Prize for Editorial Writing

Beverly Weintraub is an American journalist. She shared the 2007 Pulitzer Prize for Editorial Writing with Arthur Browne and Heidi Evans of The New York Daily News for their editorials on Ground Zero workers’ health problems.

== Biography ==
Weintraub graduated cum laude from Barnard College with a B.A. in linguistics and a minor in political science in 1982. She also wrote for, and edited the Columbia Daily Spectator. She worked at the New York Daily News for 23 years, winning a Pulitzer Prize for editorial writing in 2007 for investigating into the illness affecting first responders during 9/11.

She left the Daily News to become New York Attorney General Eric Schneiderman's chief speech writer in 2013.

She made her author debut with Wings of Gold: The Story of the First Women Naval Aviators, published in 2021.

Weintraub is currently an executive editor at The 74.
