= Arthur Lazarus Jr. =

American lawyer (1926–2019)

- Born: August 30, 1926; New York City, U.S.
- Died: July 27, 2019 (aged 92); Washington, D.C., U.S.
- Education: Columbia University (BA); Yale University (JD)
- Occupation: Lawyer

Arthur Lazarus Jr. (August 30, 1926 – July 27, 2019) was an American lawyer primarily known for his work with American Indian tribes and Alaska Native corporations. His clients included the Blackfeet, Tuscarora, Seneca, and Navajo. His best-known case was the Black Hills Land Claim on behalf of the Sioux.

== Biography ==
Arthur Lazarus was born August 30, 1926, in Brooklyn, New York and attended Poly Prep. He was graduated from Columbia University in 1946 and Yale Law School in 1949. At Columbia, he was editor of the Columbia Daily Spectator, although publication was not daily to conserve resources for the war, and a member of the Philolexian Society. Future beat poet Allen Ginsberg was one of his roommates at Columbia. His entrance to the bar was, however, delayed by his conscientious objector status during the Korean War. Eventually he joined the Washington office of the law firm of Riegelman, Strasser, Schwarz & Spiegelberg (now known as Fried, Frank, Harris, Shriver & Jacobson) as an associate, where he worked with Felix S. Cohen, then the preëminent lawyer for Indian tribes. Lazarus and Richard Schifter took over the firm's Indian law practice when Cohen died in 1953 at the age of 46.

In his first appearance before the Supreme Court, he represented the Tuscarora Nation in its unsuccessful attempt to stop eminent domain seizure of reservation land for a reservoir. Lazarus was also the attorney for the Seneca Nation in its fight against the Kinzua Dam and the Southern Tier Expressway.

He was the final attorney of record in United States v. Sioux Nation of Indians, the longest-running case in American legal history, and the largest Indian claims judgment ever awarded against the United States. He was also responsible for drafting the Native Alaskans’ proposed version of the Alaska Native Claims Settlement Act.

=== Black Hills Case ===
The legal struggle for the Black Hills land claim began in the early 1920s under tribal lawyer Richard Case where he argued that the 1877 Act of February was illegal and that the United States never made a legitimate purchase of the land. Tribal Lawyers Marvin Sonosky and Arthur Lazarus took over the case in 1956 until they won in 1980.

The United States Court of Claims on June 13, 1979, in a 5-2 majority, decided that the 1877 Act that seized the Black Hills from the Sioux was a violation of the Fifth Amendment.

On July 31, 1979, the Sioux were awarded $17.5 million with 5 percent interest totaling $105 million. However, the victory was short lived. The Indians residing in the Black Hills feared the notion that if they accept the award their land would be officially sold. This led many Sioux to believe that they would lose their land, culture and identity.

Furthermore, the two lawyers continued to work with the government to provide the tribe with just compensation for violating the 1868 Fort Laramie Treaty. In September 1979, Sonosky and Lazarus offered the tribe $44 million as a settlement for the violation in 1868, but were met with hostility.

On October 17, 1979, Solicitor General Wade McCree of the Justice Department sent an appeal to the United States Supreme Court over the initial ruling by the Court of Claims and on November 21, 1979, the Supreme Court set a date to review the claim and on December 10, the appeal was granted.

The Supreme Court case United States v. Sioux Nation of Indians was argued on March 24, 1980. On June 30, 1980, the United States Supreme Court ruled in an 8-1 majority to uphold the United States Court of Claims’ initial ruling, awarding the Sioux nation $106 million, which resulted in the largest sum ever given to an Indian tribe for illegally seized territory.

=== Post Black Hills ===
In 1991 Lazarus retired from Fried, Frank, which was closing its Indian law practice while expanding further into lucrative work in Mergers and Acquisitions. Shortly afterwards he became “of counsel” at Sonosky, Chambers, Sachse, & Endreson, a law firm specializing in Indian Law. He retired in July 2011.
