= Nancy Carriuolo =

Nancy Carriuolo was named the ninth president of Rhode Island College on May 12, 2008 by the Rhode Island Board of Governors for Higher Education. She began her service as president on July 1, 2008 and is ending her service in May 2016.

During 2007-2008, Carriuolo served as Interim Vice President for Academic Affairs at Rhode Island College, overseeing the management of academic activities and programs for the college, while maintaining her duties as Deputy Commissioner and Chief Academic Officer at the Rhode Island Office of Higher Education (RIOHE). Carriuolo was promoted to that position in 2006 after serving since 2000 as Associate Commissioner for Academic and Student Affairs.

== Career ==
Carriuolo served as the director of the Office of School/College Relations at the New England Association of Schools and Colleges (NEASC) and, immediately prior to joining the Office of Higher Education, served as Dean of the College of Arts and Sciences at the University of New Haven, where she became a tenured full professor of English in 1987. She also has experience as a junior- and senior-high school teacher and department chair.

Carriuolo is the author of over 30 publications with regional, national, or international audiences. Paul Simon, while a U.S. senator, read into the Congressional Record one of her essays originally published in the Chronicle of Higher Education. Carriuolo has published three essays in the Chronicle, most recently on April 18, 2010. Her most recent essay described the campus-wide budget review process that saved $3/4M in her first year as president. She has also published an essay in Education Week, the K-12 companion periodical of the Chronicle. At the invitation of Dr. John Gardner, creator of the internationally known Freshman-Year Experience series, Carriuolo also wrote a monograph on PK-16 partnerships.

Carriuolo has worked with a number of regional, national, and international higher education and business organizations as a consultant, is affiliated with several professional associations, and is a past president of the National Association for Developmental Education. In 2009, she received national recognition for her lifelong achievement in developmental education when named a CLADEA fellow. Carriuolo is a longstanding member of the board of the Journal of Developmental Education. She was also the founding statewide leader of the Rhode Island Chapter of the American Council on Education's network of women leaders in higher education. She also served on the board of New England Dollars for Scholars and is currently a member of the boards of the Tech Collective as well as the Association for Authentic and Evidence-based Learning (AAEEBL), an international association. She serves on the executive committee of the statewide Campus Compact and on the board of the Veterans Auditorium (the Vets).

In 2018 an e-book of selected correspondence by Rhode Island social activist, journalist and RIC adjunct faculty member Richard Walton was edited by Carriuolo & Herbert Weiss and published to commemorate Walton's life and activism.

== Education ==
Carriuolo earned bachelor's and master's degrees from the State University of New York at Brockport and a Ph.D. from the State University of New York at Buffalo; she also attended the Radcliffe Institute for Advanced Study, where she completed post-doctoral studies in organizational behavior and management, fundraising, and negotiation.

== Personal ==
Her husband Ralf is a native Rhode Islander who holds an undergraduate degree from Yale University and a Ph.D. from Wesleyan University. He is Professor Emeritus of Humanities at the University of New Haven, where he served as a music professor. Their son Matthew graduated from Brown University with a B.S. in physics and tutors physics on-line.
