= Raymond Clapper Memorial Award =

American journalism award

Washington Reporting Raymond Clapper Award
- Awarded for: "Distinguished Washington reporting"
- Sponsored by: Raymond Clapper Memorial Association (1944–2003); Scripps Howard Foundation (2004–2011)
- Location: Washington, D.C.
- Country: United States
- Presented by: White House Correspondents' Association, Scripps Howard Foundation
- Hosted by: White House Correspondents' Association; American Society of Newspaper Editors; National Journalism Awards
- Formerly called: Raymond Clapper Memorial Award
- First award: 1944
- Final award: 2011
- Website: https://www.pressclubinstitute.org/raymond-clapper-memorial-award-winners-from-1944-to-2011/

The Raymond Clapper Memorial Award, later called the Washington Reporting Raymond Clapper Award, was an American journalism award presented from 1944 to 2011. Named in honor of Raymond Clapper (1892–1944), the award was given "to a journalist or team for distinguished Washington reporting."

The award was presented most often at the annual White House Correspondents' Association (WHCA) dinner, but for a period in the years 1951 to 1965 it was given at the annual American Society of Newspaper Editors (ASNE) dinner. In the early days of the Award, it was often presented to the winner by the U.S. President, who was usually a guest at the press dinner.

Starting in 2004 the award was presented as part of Scripps Howard's National Journalism Awards (later known as the Scripps Howard Awards). The Raymond Clapper Award was discontinued after 2011.

== History ==
Reporter and Scripps Howard columnist Raymond Clapper died in 1944 during World War II while covering the U.S. invasion of the Marshall Islands. Following his death, the Raymond Clapper Memorial Association (Note: Raymond Clapper Memorial Association 1150 15th Street NW Washington, D.C. 20071-0001 EIN: 52-0783081) was incorporated in Washington, D.C. "to perpetuate the memory of Clapper" through the Raymond Clapper Memorial Award.

"The organizing committee of the association was composed of the heads of various newspaper organizations in Washington," including Scripps-Howard Newspapers, the Chicago Sun, United Press, the White House Correspondents' Association, United Feature Syndicate, Overseas Writers Association, and the Gridiron Club.

Under the terms of the incorporation of the Clapper Memorial Association, "the Standing Committee of Correspondents, the governing body of the Washington press corps ... will be in complete control of the award, ... so that it will always be under the direction of the working, newspapermen of the national capital."

The founding trustees of the Clapper Association were George B. Parker, editor-in-chief of Scripps-Howard Newspapers; Byron Price of the Associated Press; and Eugene Meyer of The Washington Post.

Under Scripps Howard, the Washington Reporting Raymond Clapper Award was presented from 2004 to 2011, at which point it was discontinued.

== Overview ==
In 1993, the criteria for the Award was described as "...any Washington-based daily newspaper reporter whose work most closely approximated the ideals of fair and painstaking reporting, and the good craftsmanship of Raymond Clapper."

The winner of the Award was selected by a panel of five editors/writers from a list of finalists. Most years, Honorable Mention and Second Place prizes were awarded as well.

== List of awardees ==
Year	Recipient	Organization	Presenter	Note/Ref
1944	Ernie Pyle	Scripps Howard News Service	Sigma Delta Chi	"For distinguished foreign correspondence"
1944	Raymond P. Brandt	St. Louis Post Dispatch	WHCA	Brandt is technically considered the first recipient of the award
1945	Bert Andrews	New York Herald Tribune	WHCA	
1946	Thomas Lunsford Stokes	United Feature Syndicate		
1947	Nat Solon Finney	Minneapolis Star and Tribune		
1947	Bert Andrews	New York Herald Tribune		Honorable Mention
1947	Alfred Friendly	The Washington Post		Honorable Mention
1948	Peter Edson	Newspaper Enterprise Association	WHCA	Award presented by President Truman
1949	Jack Steele	New York Herald Tribune	WHCA	Award presented by President Truman
1950	Paul Logan Martin	Gannett Newspapers		
1951	John M. Hightower	Associated Press	ASNE	
1952	Charles T. Lucey	Scripps Howard News Service		
1953	Doris Fleeson	United Feature Syndicate	ASNE	
1953	James Free	The Birmingham News	ASNE	Honorable Mention
1954	James Barrett Reston	The New York Times	ASNE	
1955	Clark R. Mollenhoff	Minneapolis Star and Tribune and Des Moines Register and Tribune	ASNE	
1955	William H. Lawrence	The New York Times	ASNE	Honorable Mention
1956	Pat Munroe	Albuquerque Journal	ASNE	
1956	Lyle C. Wilson	United Press Association	ASNE	Honorable Mention
1957	Chalmers M. Roberts	The Washington Post and Times-Herald	ASNE	
1957	Richard L. Wilson	Minneapolis Star and Tribune	ASNE	Honorable Mention
1958	Edward T. Folliard	The Washington Post and Times-Herald		
1959	Vance H. Trimble	Scripps Howard News Service		
1960	James Marlow	Associated Press	ASNE	
1960	Fletcher Knebel and Charles Bailey	Minneapolis Star and Tribune and Des Moines Register and Tribune	ASNE	Honorable Mention
1960	Don Oberdorfer and Walter Pincus	Knight Newspapers	ASNE	Honorable Mention
1961	Richard Fryklund	Washington Evening Star		
1961	David Wise	New York Herald Tribune		Honorable Mention
1962	Morton Mintz	The Washington Post	ASNE	
1962	David Broder	The Washington Star	ASNE	Honorable Mention
1962	Charles C. Keely, Jr.	Copley Press	ASNE	Honorable Mention
1963	Jerry Landauer	The Wall Street Journal	ASNE	
1963	Howard Simons and Murray Marder	The Washington Post	ASNE	Honorable Mention
1963	Charles W. Bailey II	Minneapolis Tribune	ASNE	Honorable Mention
1964	John Barron and Paul B. Hope	Washington Evening Star	ASNE	Award presented by guest speaker Alfred Hitchcock
1964	James McCartney and Charles Nicodemus	Chicago Daily News	ASNE	Honorable Mention
1964	John Cramer	Washington Daily News	ASNE	Honorable Mention
1964	Dom Bonafede	New York Herald Tribune	ASNE	Honorable Mention
1964	Louis Kohlmeier	The Wall Street Journal	ASNE	Honorable Mention
1964	David Wise	New York Herald Tribune	ASNE	Honorable Mention
1965	Nathan K. Kotz	The Des Moines Register and Minneapolis Tribune	ASNE	
1965	Dom Bonafede	New York Herald Tribune	ASNE	Honorable Mention
1965	Bem Price	Associated Press	ASNE	Honorable Mention
1966	Howard Simons	The Washington Post		
1966	Leonard Downie Jr.	The Washington Post		Honorable Mention
1967	Nathan K. Kotz	The Des Moines Register and Minneapolis Tribune	WHCA	
1967	Jerry Landauer	The Wall Street Journal	WHCA	Honorable Mention
1968	David Kraslow and Stuart H. Loory	Los Angeles Times	WHCA	
1968	Jerry Landauer	The Wall Street Journal	WHCA	Honorable Mention
1969	Tom Lambert	Los Angeles Times		
1969	William J. Eaton	Chicago Daily News		Honorable Mention
1970	Jared D. Stout	Newhouse News Service	WHCA	
1970	Max Frankel	The New York Times	WHCA	Special Award
1971	James R. Polk	Washington Evening Star		
1971	Frank Wright	Minneapolis Tribune		Second Place
1971	James Risser	The Des Moines Register		Honorable Mention
1972	Jean Heller	Associated Press		
1972	Carl Bernstein and Bob Woodward	The Washington Post		Second Place
1973	James R. Polk	Washington Star-News		
1973	Nathan K. Kotz and Adam Clymer	The Washington Post and The Baltimore Sun		Second Place
1973	Jerry Landauer	The Wall Street Journal		Honorable Mention
1974	Brooks Jackson	Associated Press	WHCA	
1974	Peter A. Harkness and Mary Link (Frost)	Congressional Quarterly	WHCA	Second Place
1975	James Risser	The Des Moines Register	WHCA	
1975	Albert R. Hunt	The Wall Street Journal	WHCA	Second Place
1976	Alan Horton and Carl West	Scripps Howard News Service	WHCA	
1976	Scott Armstrong and Maxine Cheshire	The Washington Post	WHCA	Second Place
1977	George Anthan and James Risser	The Des Moines Register	WHCA	
1977	Walter Pincus	The Washington Post	WHCA	Second Place
1977	Brooks Jackson and Evans Witt	Associated Press	WHCA	Honorable Mention
1977	Gene Goldenberg and Dale McFeatters	Scripps Howard News Service	WHCA	Honorable Mention
1978	Gordon E. White	Salt Lake City Deseret News		
1978	John P. Wallach	Hearst Newspapers		Second Place
1979	George Anthan	The Des Moines Register		
1979	James Coates and Eleanor Randolph	Chicago Tribune		Second Place
1980	Nicholas Lemann	The Washington Post	WHCA	
1980	John J. Fialka	The Washington Star	WHCA	Second Place
1981	Joseph Albright and Cheryl Arvidson	Cox Newspapers	WHCA	
1981	James Coates and Bill Neikirk	Chicago Tribune	WHCA	Second Place
1982	Bruce Ingersoll	Chicago Sun-Times		
1982	William Prochnau	The Washington Post		Second Place
1983	Gregory Gordon	United Press International	WHCA	Tie
1983	Dennis Camire and Mark Rohner	Gannett News Service	WHCA	Tie
1983	Lawrence O'Rourke	St. Louis Post-Dispatch	WHCA	Second Place
1984	Mark J. Thompson	Fort Worth Star-Telegram	WHCA	
1984	David Rogers	The Wall Street Journal	WHCA	Second Place
1984	Fred Hiatt	The Washington Post	WHCA	Honorable Mention
1985	Frank Greve	Knight Ridder Newspapers		
1985	Jim Stewart	Cox Newspapers		Second Place
1985	Robert L. Jackson and Ronald J. Ostrow	Los Angeles Times		Honorable Mention
1986	Bob Adams	St. Louis Post-Dispatch	WHCA	
1986	Thomas Moore and Michael York	Knight Ridder	WHCA	Second Place
1986	James O'Shea and Douglas Frantz	Chicago Tribune	WHCA	Honorable Mention
1987	George Anthan	The Des Moines Register	WHCA	
1987	Jim Stewart	Cox Newspapers	WHCA	Second Place
1987	Keith Epstein	The Plain Dealer	WHCA	Honorable Mention
1988	Mark Thompson	Knight Ridder	WHCA	
1988	Don Oberdorfer	The Washington Post	WHCA	Second Place, tie
1988	Matthew Purdy	The Philadelphia Inquirer	WHCA	Second Place, tie
1989	Bill Lambrecht	St. Louis Post-Dispatch	WHCA	
1989	John Hall	Media General	WHCA	Second Place
1989	Christopher Drew & Michael Tackett	Chicago Tribune	WHCA	Honorable Mention
1989	Jim Stewart & Andrew Alexander	Cox Newspapers	WHCA	Honorable Mention
1990	Lee Bowman and Andrew Schneider	The Pittsburgh Press	WHCA	
1990	Christopher Scanlan	Knight Ridder	WHCA	Second Place
1991	Bill Lambrecht	St. Louis Post-Dispatch	WHCA	
1991	Tom Squitieri	USA Today	WHCA	Second Place
1991	Philip A. Kuntz	Congressional Quarterly	WHCA	Honorable Mention
1992	Charles Shepard and Wendy Melillo	The Washington Post	WHCA	
1992	John Solomon	Associated Press	WHCA	Second Place
1992	Christopher Drew & Michael Tackett	Chicago Tribune	WHCA	Honorable Mention
1993	Tom Squitieri	USA Today		
1993	Peter Brown and Andrew Schneider	Scripps Howard News Service		Second Place
1994	Susan Feeney and Steve McGonigle	The Dallas Morning News		
1994	Jonathan Tilove	Newhouse News Service		Second Place
1994	Lee Davidson	Deseret News		Honorable Mention
1995	Sharon Schmickle and Tom Hamburger	Minneapolis Star Tribune	WHCA	
1995	Patrick Sloyan	Newsday	WHCA	Second Place
1995	Wendy Koch	Hearst Newspapers	WHCA	Honorable Mention
1996	Elizabeth Marchak	The Plain Dealer		
1996	Keith Epstein and Bill Sloat	The Plain Dealer		Second Place
1996	Jonathan Tilove	Newhouse News Service		Honorable Mention
1997	Marcus Stern	Copley News Service		
1997	Joan McKinney	Baton Rouge Advocate		Second Place
1997	Susan Feeney	The Dallas Morning News		Honorable Mention
1997	David Wood	Newhouse News Service		Honorable Mention
1998	Bill Lambrecht	St. Louis Post-Dispatch		
1998	Lee Davidson	Deseret News		Second Place
1998	Greg Hitt and Phil Kuntz	The Wall Street Journal		Honorable Mention
1998	Rowan Scarborough	The Washington Times		Honorable Mention
1999	Bob Davis and Helene Cooper	The Wall Street Journal	WHCA	
1999	Richard Whittle and David Wood	The Dallas Morning News and Newhouse News Service	WHCA	Second Place
2000	John Aloysius Farrell	The Boston Globe		
2000	David Wood	Newhouse News Service		Second Place
2000	Michael Grunwald	The Washington Post		Honorable Mention
2001	Sudarsan Raghavan and Sumana Chatterjee	Knight Ridder	WHCA	
2001	Jeff Nesmith and Ralph Haurwitz	Cox Newspapers	WHCA	Second Place
2001	Alan Elsner	Reuters	WHCA	Honorable Mention
2002	Greg Jaffe	The Washington Post		
2002	Jon Sawyer	St. Louis Dispatch		Second Place, tie
2002	Jonathan Tilove	Newhouse News Service		Second Place, tie
2003	Jonathan Landay and Warren P. Strobel	Knight Ridder	Washington Press Club Foundation	Received the award in the Senate Press Gallery
2003	Mark Benjamin	United Press International	Washington Press Club Foundation	Second Place
2004	Greg Jaffe	The Wall Street Journal	National Journalism Awards	Award taken over by Scripps Howard
2005	Chris Adams and Alison Young	Knight Ridder Washington Bureau	National Journalism Awards	
2006	Wes Allison	St. Petersburg Times, Florida	National Journalism Awards	
2007	Marisa Taylor, Margaret Talev, and Greg Gordon	McClatchy Washington Bureau	National Journalism Awards	
2008	David Willman	Los Angeles Times	National Journalism Awards	
2009	Thomas Frank	USA Today	National Journalism Awards	
2010	Adam Liptak	The New York Times	Scripps Howard Awards	
2011	Damian Paletta	The Wall Street Journal	Scripps Howard Awards	
2011	David Cloud and W.J. Hennigan	Los Angeles Times	Scripps Howard Awards	Finalist, for "Drone Wars"
2011	Eric Lipton	The New York Times	Scripps Howard Awards	Finalist, for "The Champions"
