= Nick Kotz =

American journalist (1932–2020)

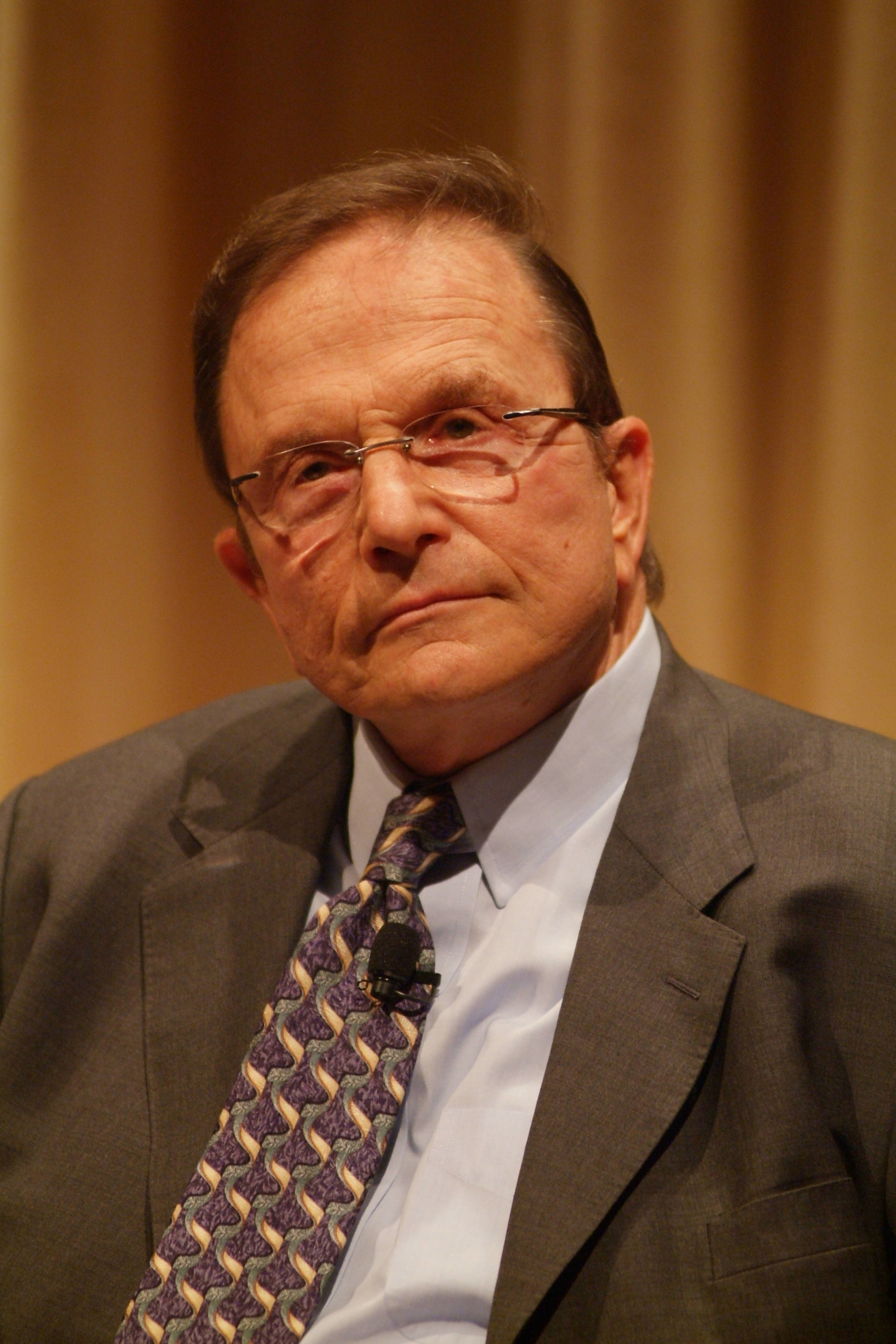
- Kotz in 2007
- Born: September 16, 1932; San Antonio, Texas, US
- Died: April 26, 2020 (aged 87); Broad Run, Virginia, US
- Education: Dartmouth College, London School of Economics
- Occupations: Journalist, Author, and Historian
- Spouse: Mary Lynn Kotz
- Writing career
- Genre: History
- Notable awards: Pulitzer Prize for National Reporting; Olive Branch Award; Sigma Delta Chi Award for Washington correspondence; Raymond Clapper Memorial Award (1965, 1967); Robert F. Kennedy Memorial Award
- Website: www.nickkotz.com

Nathan K. "Nick" Kotz (September 16, 1932 – April 26, 2020) was an American journalist, author, and historian.

His most recent book, The Harness Makers Dream: Nathan Kallison and the Rise of South Texas, tells the story of Ukrainian immigrant Nathan Kallison's journey to the United States. He is best known for his 2005 book Judgment Days: Lyndon Baines Johnson, Martin Luther King Jr., and the Laws that Changed America chronicling the roles of US President Lyndon B. Johnson and Martin Luther King Jr. in the passage of the 1964, 1965, and 1968 civil rights laws. Kotz won a Pulitzer Prize for National Reporting in 1968 for his reporting of unsanitary conditions in many meat packing plants, which helped ensure the passage of the Wholesome Meat Act.

== Life ==
Kotz was born in San Antonio, Texas. As a reporter for the Des Moines Register and the Washington Post, and as a freelance writer, Nick Kotz won many of journalism's most important honors, including the Sigma Delta Chi Award for Washington correspondence, the Raymond Clapper Memorial Award, and the first Robert F. Kennedy Memorial Award.

His study of American military leadership won the National Magazine Award for public service.

His book Wild Blue Yonder: Money, Politics, and the B-1 Bomber won the Olive Branch Award.

Kotz's other books include A Passion For Equality: George Wiley and the Movement (with Mary Lynn Kotz); Let Them Eat Promises: The Politics of Hunger; and The Unions (with Haynes Johnson).

A magna cum laude graduate of Dartmouth College, Kotz did graduate study in international relations at the London School of Economics.

After college, he served as a lieutenant in the United States Marine Corps. Committed to education, he served as a distinguished adjunct professor at the American University School of Communications and as a Senior Journalist in Residence, for a semester, at Duke University. He was married to Mary Lynn Kotz, a journalist and author of Rauschenberg: Art and Life; and co-author of Upstairs at the White House: My Life With the First Ladies. Their son, Jack Mitchell Kotz, is a photographer.

Kotz died in April 2020 as a result of an accident involving his automobile at his home.

== Works ==
- Let them eat promises: the politics of hunger in America, Doubleday Anchor books, 1971
- A Passion for Equality: George A. Wiley and the Movement, W. W. Norton, Incorporated, 1977, ISBN 0-393-07517-6
- Wild blue yonder: money, politics, and the B-1 bomber, Pantheon Books, 1988, ISBN 9780394557007
- Judgment Days: Lyndon Baines Johnson, Martin Luther King, Jr., and the Laws that Changed America. Houghton Mifflin Harcourt. January 2006. pp. 1–. ISBN 0-618-64183-1.
- The Harness Maker's Dream: Nathan Kallison and the Rise of South Texas. TCU Press. October 25, 2013. pp. 2–. ISBN 978-0-87565-593-2.
