= Louis Lautier =

American journalist

Louis R. Lautier (1897-1962) was the first African-American journalist admitted to the White House Correspondents' Association (1951) and to the National Press Club (1955).

== Biography ==
Lautier was born in New Iberia, Louisiana, in 1897 and raised Catholic in New Orleans. He attended Straight College (later Dillard University) in New Orleans, Morris Brown College in Atlanta, from which he received an A.B. and an honorary LL.D., and studied at Howard Law School in Washington.

In 1945, Lautier became Washington correspondent for the National Negro Publishers Association, which provided news stories to the black press. He covered White House press conferences but could not get a Congressional press pass. The Standing Committee of Correspondents, a group of reporters that decided on credentials for the Senate and House press galleries, rejected his application because his client papers were mostly weeklies and the press gallery admitted only reporters for daily papers. In 1947, Lautier took his case to the Senate Rules Committee, whose chairman, Illinois Senator C. Wayland Brooks, ordered the gallery to admit him.

He became a member of the White House Correspondents Association in 1951 and began attending their annual dinners two years later. In 1955, Lautier applied for membership in the National Press Club. Division within the membership was so intense that Press Club held a secret referendum on admitting him. He was approved by a vote of 377 to 281.

Lautier retired from the NNPA in 1961 to become special assistant to the chairman of the Republican National Committee and to write a column, "Looking at the Record," which the RNC distributed to the black press. He died of a heart attack on May 6, 1962.

== See also ==
- National Newspaper Publishers Association
