= Texas Christian University Press =

University press in the United States

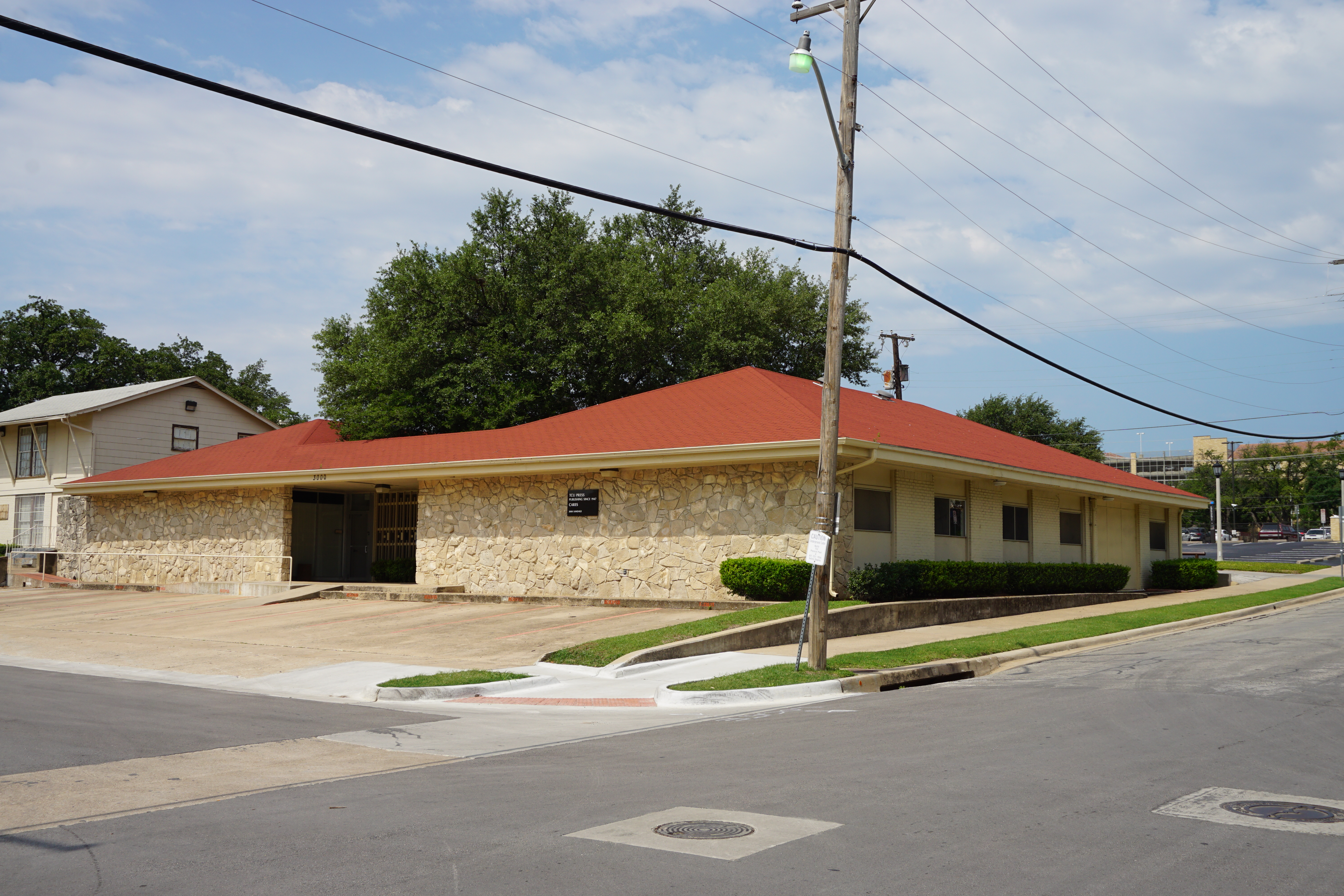
- TCU Press building
- Parent company: Texas Christian University
- Founded: 1947
- Country of origin: United States
- Headquarters location: Fort Worth, Texas
- Distribution: Texas A&M University Press
- Publication types: Books
- Official website: www.prs.tcu.edu

Texas Christian University Press (or TCU Press) is a university press that is part of Texas Christian University. Founded in 1947, the press releases works that focus on the history and culture of Texas and the broader Southwest. It is a member of the Texas Book Consortium, organized by Texas A&M University Press.
