= George Anthan =

American journalist (1936–2016)

George Peter Anthan (June 2, 1936 – August 17, 2016) was an American journalist. He was the Washington Bureau Chief for the Des Moines Register.

== Biography ==
Anthan was born in St. Joseph, Missouri, in 1936, and was a graduate of the University of Kansas School of Journalism.

He spent his early career reporting in Valley Junction and Des Moines, Iowa, for the Des Moines Tribune. In 1971, he joined the Register's prestigious Washington, D.C., bureau. There he covered agriculture, food safety, and farm policy issues for 30 years.

Anthan stated, "My credentials for covering agriculture were established in my first several weeks working for the Des Moines Register when I was assigned to cover the Iowa State Fair. And immediately—which is a treasured assignment, since the book State Fair was written by a Des Moines Register reporter — and I immediately identified in the caption some purebred swine as Herefords. It was the only time in my 40-some-year career at the Des Moines Register that I heard the words, 'Stop the presses.'"

Anthan used an Underwood and then an IBM Selectric II typewriter for most of his career.

== Personal life and death ==
An avid bicyclist, Anthan rode his bike between his home in suburban Maryland and his office in the National Press Building for 30 years, logging over 100,000 miles in all. A close friend, Donald Kaul, lured Anthan back to Iowa each year beginning in 1974 to ride his bicycle across the state in RAGBRAI, now the world's largest bicycle ride, which Kaul and John Karras started in 1973.

Anthan was a member of the Gridiron Club.

He died on August 17, 2016, at the age of 80 from cardiac arrest. He was survived by his wife Ann Anthan, a Missouri native, lover of dogs, and road racing enthusiast.

== Awards ==
Anthan was the winner of several awards for outstanding journalism, including the Raymond Clapper Memorial Award (three times) and National Press Club awards. He was twice a Pulitzer Prize finalist. Anthan also won an Alicia Patterson Journalism Fellowship in 2004 to research and write about the de-population of the northern Great Plains.
