= Tom Squitieri =

American journalist (b. 1953)

- Born: August 25, 1953 (age 73); Pittsburgh, Pennsylvania, USA
- Died: September 1, 2024
- Education: Washington & Jefferson College
- Occupation: Journalist
- Website: tomsquitieri.com redsnowltd.com

Tom Squitieri (August 25, 1953 – September 1, 2024) was an American journalist, public speaker, and public relations specialist. From January 2018 until his death, he was the Pentagon correspondent for Red Snow News.

Squitieri was an award-winning reporter with USA Today, winning the Raymond Clapper Memorial Award in 1993 after coming in second for the same award in 1991.

After the September 11 attacks, he reported from the Pentagon as well as Iraq, Uzbekistan, Turkey and Italy. Other experience included presidential and congressional campaigns in 2000 and 1996, Capitol Hill, various Bill Clinton and political scandals, crime, drugs, arms smuggling and lead reporting on breaking news stories. Foreign assignments include an array of conflicts around the world, including the 1989 Panama invasion, Haiti (1991–1997), Northern Ireland, 1991 Gulf War (Iran, Iraq, Turkey), Moldova (1992), former Yugoslavia (1992–1996), Burundi and Rwanda (1993–1994), Central Asia and Afghanistan (2001–2003), Iraq (2003–2004).

Squitieri was forced to resign from USA Today in May 2005 after a dispute over attribution of quotes he reported in a story revealing Pentagon failures to properly up-armor vehicles in Iraq.

After leaving USA Today, Squitieri wrote columns for the Foreign Policy Association, The Hill, and U.S. News & World Report. He also was an adjunct professor at Washington & Jefferson College and at American University.

Squitieri wrote three articles for the Huffington Post in 2011 that were later deleted for "not adequately disclos[ing] a material conflict of interest." Salon claimed he had obfuscated his employment with Qorvis Communications, a company that is registered as a pro-Bahrain lobbyist in the US. Each article contained this reader's note: "Tom Squitieri is a journalist and is also working with the Bahrain government on media awareness."
