= Columbia Daily Spectator =

Student newspaper of Columbia University

- Type: Student newspaper
- Format: Broadsheet
- School: Barnard College; Columbia University
- Owner: Spectator Publishing Company, Inc.
- Founder(s): Frederick William Holls; H.G. Paine
- Founded: 1877; 149 years ago
- Headquarters: New York City, U.S.
- Circulation: 8,000
- OCLC number: 665221386
- Website: columbiaspectator.com
- Free online archives: spectatorarchive.library.columbia.edu

The Columbia Daily Spectator (known colloquially as Spec) is the student-run newspaper of both Columbia University and Barnard College. Founded in 1877, it is the second-oldest continuously operating college news daily in the nation after The Harvard Crimson, and has been legally independent from the university since 1962. It is published at 120th Street and Claremont Avenue in New York City. During the academic term, it is published online Sunday through Thursday and printed weekly. In addition to serving as a campus newspaper, the Spectator also reports the latest news of the surrounding Morningside Heights community. The paper is delivered to over 150 locations throughout the Morningside Heights neighborhood.

== History ==
First issue of the Columbia Spectator, published on July 1, 1877

The Columbia Spectator was founded in 1877 by Frederick William Holls and H.G. Paine. Also serving on the paper's first editorial board was William Barclay Parsons. Several attempts at student journalism were made before the Spectator. The first student publication formed at Columbia was the short lived Philolexian Observer, founded in 1813. The Cap and Gown was founded in 1867 as both a student newspaper and literary publication. It was renamed to the Acta Columbiana in 1873, and was absorbed by the Spectator in 1885, which also took its motto, A Studentibus Studentibusque.

The Spectator was first published as a fortnightly. In 1898 it became a weekly, and a year later began to be published semi-weekly, before finally becoming a daily paper in 1902.

In April 2014, Spectator announced it would become the first Ivy League newspaper to cut its daily print for a weekly distribution to focus on digital content and increase revenue. The plan was approved shortly thereafter by the Board of Trustees, passing 7 to 4. John R. MacArthur, one of the members of the board, resigned in protest of the decision, but the paper did see the expected revenue increase.

== Organization ==
Spectator is published by Spectator Publishing Company Inc, an independent 501(c)(3) corporation. Spectator Publishing Company was formed in 1962 and has been independent of Columbia University since then. The president of the Spectator Publishing Company also serves as the editor in chief of the Columbia Daily Spectator.

Spectator's writing departments, each headed by one or two editors, include university news, city news, sports, arts and culture, opinion, and lifestyle. The other non-writing departments, also headed by their own respective editors, include photography, illustrations, graphics, audio, video, and copy. The Business & Innovations departments, which oversee the newspaper's advertising, finances, software development, and alumni relations, are headed by the publisher. Spectator also runs The Eye which is a magazine focused on publishing long-form feature articles and essays.

The paper is currently run by the 149th managing board. First-time writers at Columbia begin their time at the paper with a 3 to 4 month trainee semester, during which they learn the basics of writing an article and publish their first articles. Each November and December, students run for positions at the paper, a process that takes nearly a month. They begin by shadowing, or sitting with the current editors or associate editors and learning the editing process. Next they write proposals for their desired position. The students then take editing tests created by their department editor that test them on fundamentals. Finally, they complete the Turkeyshoots process with an interview. The results of the process, including the new managing board, are announced in mid-December, the weekend before finals.

== Recent spinoffs ==
In 2005, Spec started printing La Página, a weekly flyer in Spanish with translations of some of the week's English content most relevant to neighborhood readers. It folded within the year.

The next year, in February 2006, the paper launched a series of blogs, SpecBlogs. It was the third Ivy League paper to do this, after The Harvard Crimson's Sports Blog (December 2005) and The Daily Pennsylvanian's TheBuzz (January 2006).

In September 2006, Spectator staff launched The Eye, a weekly magazine featuring investigative pieces and commentary on Columbia and New York City. The name of The Eye relates both to the fact that one "spectates" with it and urban theorist Jane Jacobs' notion that "eyes on the street" help keep neighborhoods safe.

In March 2010, Spec launched a new blog, Spectrum, which is updated several times a day with breaking news, columns, and features.

In January 2018, Spec launched a branded content studio, Spectator Brand Studios. It was the second Ivy League paper to do this, after the Harvard Crimson.

== Controversies ==
In October 1995, the newspaper published an antisemitic column by a senior student. In the controversial column, which The New York Times reported on, the student wrote: "I single out Jews because their oppression of blacks cannot go unnoticed while they disguise their evilness under the skirts and costumes of the Rabbi," A number of Jewish students called for a boycott of the newspaper.

Spectator has been criticized publicly by staff members over the years for obscuring its election procedures. On October 16, 2009, Ryan Bubinski, then the online editor of Spec, shut down the website in protest of a constitutional violation. The website was restored on the 18th, and Bubinski left the staff of the newspaper. The lack of a constitution brought renewed protests in 2018 when concerns over potential prior misconduct of a staffer surfaced during the Turkeyshoots process. The Corporate Board of Spectator followed an internal policy to investigate the claims, which was not made public to staffers. Following the Turkeyshoots season, the majority of the newspaper's Sports section resigned in protest.

In 2018 and 2019, work by journalists at the paper played an important role in uncovering the plagiarism scandal around Charles K. Armstrong, a professor of history at Columbia University. It also, in 2019, found that a number of professors accused or found guilty of sexual misconduct remained on campus, breaking news that English professor Michael Golston had been found guilty of sexually assaulting a student.

== Recent leadership ==
Year	Board	Editor in Chief	Publisher	Managing Editor
2026	150th	Tsehai Alfred	Melinda Yao	Manuela Moreyra
2025	149th	Shea Vance	Albert Tsai	Heather Chen
2024	148th	Isabella Ramírez	Katie Zhang	Esha Karam
2023	147th	Irie Sentner	Tyler Shern	Andrew Park
2022	146th	Clara Ence Morse	Vilanna Wang	Dia Gill
2021	145th	Sarah Braka	Tamarah Wallace	Elizabeth Karpen
2020	144th	Karen Xia	Isabel Jauregui	Shubham Saharan
2019	143rd	Katherine Gerberich	Nima Mozhgani	Rahil Kamath
2018	142nd	Jessica Spitz	Michael Tai	Aaron Holmes
2017	141st	Catie Edmondson	Anurak Saelaow	J. Clara Chan
2016	140th	Caroline Chiu	Rachit Mohan	Ben Libman
2015	139th	Michael Ouimette	Daniel Friedman	Samantha Cooney
2014	138th	Abby Abrams	Michael Ouimette	Steven Lau
2013	137th	Samuel Roth	Alex Smyk	Finn Vigeland
2012	136th	Sarah Darville	Alex Smyk	Maggie Alden
2011	135th	Samuel Roth	Aditya Mukerjee	Michele Cleary
2010	134th	Ben Cotton	Akhil Mehta	Thomas Rhiel
2009	133rd	Melissa Repko	Julia Feldberg	Elizabeth Simins
2008	132nd	Tom Faure	Manal Alam	Amanda Sebba
2007	131st	John Davisson	John Mascari	Amanda Erickson
2006	130th	Steve Moncada	Jacob Olson	Tim Shenk, succ. by Nick Klagge
2006	130th	Steve Moncada	John Mascari	Tim Shenk, succ. by Nick Klagge
2005	129th	Megan Greenwell	Chase Behringer	Theo Orsher
2005	129th	Megan Greenwell	Chase Behringer	Liz Fink
2004	128th	Nick Summers	Lauren Appelbaum, succ. by Tanner Zucker	James Romoser
2003	127th	Telis Demos	Amit Melwani	Juliana Castedo
2002	126th	Alice Boone	Rob Bruce	Isolde Raftery
2001	125th	Michael Mirer	Jeff Posnick	Nick Schifrin
2000	124th	Dan Laidman	Jonathan Gordin	Miriam Haskell
1999	123rd	Nathan Hale	Matthew Greer	Demetra Kasimis
1998	122nd	Eli Sanders	David S. Karp	Leila Nesson
1997	121st	Kim Van Duzer	Julie Yufe	Sandra P. Angulo
1996	120th	Hans Chen	Graham Goodkin	Lauren Goodman
1995	119th	Peter G. Freeman	Fredrik Stanton	Henry Tam, Jr.
1994	118th	Ruth Halikman	Chris Conway	Michael Stanton
1993	117th	Elizabeth Berke	Katherine Huibonhoa	Leyla Kokmen
1992	116th	Kristina Nye	Ram Rao	Jessica Shaw
1991	115th	Kirsten Danis	Andrew Rothschild	Catherine Thorpe
1990	114th	Julie Zuckerman	Anna Compaglia	Robert Hardt, Jr.
1989	113th	Josh Gillette	Erika Henik	Jonathan Earle
1988	112th	Tracy Connor	Roger Rubin	Asha Badranith
1987	111th	Sara Just	Alison Craiglow	John Oswald
1986	110th	Jacqueline Shea Murphy	Toshihiko Saito	Elizabeth Schwartz
1985	109th	Anne Kornhauser	Thomas Fitzsimmons	William Teichner
1984	108th	Aaron J. Freiwald	Thomas Fitzsimmons	Robert Zeiger
1983	107th	Steven Waldman	Peter Baltay	Kate Schaefer
1982	106th	John Zimmerman	Robert Hughes	Todd Bressi
1981	105th	Stuart Karle	Beverly Weintraub ("Business Manager")	Pete Brown
1980	104th	Jon Elsen	Bonnie Spiro ("Business Manager")	Chris Wellisz
1979	103rd	Jim Schachter	Carol Futernick ("Business Manager")	David Rosenberg
1978	102nd	Joe Ferullo	Sheldon Nussbaum ("Business Manager")	Mitch Rollnick
1977	101st	Richard Hart	David Margules ("Publisher"), Susan Wagner ("Business Manager")	(none)
1976	100th	Gregg Bloche, succ. by Jonathan Steinberg	Jon Lukomnik ("Publisher"), Michelle Seltzer ("Business Manager")	Jonathan Steinberg, succ. by David Margules
1975	99th	David Raab	Brian Dowd ("Business Manager")	Ted Green
1974	98th	Eric Rieder	Jay Lisnow ("Business Manager")	David Smith
1973	97th	Gail Robinson	Dan Dolgin ("Business Manager")	Richard Briffault
1972	96th	John Brecher	L. Stanton Towne, succ. by Geoffrey Colvin ("Business Manager")	Maureen McGuirl
1971	95th	Jon Groner	Jonathan Kandel ("Business Manager")	Lillian Ehrlich
1970	94th	Martin Flumenbaum	Mitchell Gerber, succ. by Robert J. Hunt ("Business Manager")	Juris Kaža
1969	93rd	Paul Starr	Lawrence D. Levin ("Business Manager")	Robert Hardman
1968	92nd	Robert Friedman	Nicholas Garaufis ("Business Manager")	Charles L. Skoro
1967	91st	Christopher Friedrichs	Leon Wyszewianski ("Business Manager")	David Heim
1966	90th	Alan S. Lake	Stuart A. Schlang ("Business Manager")	Mark Minton
1965	89th	Michael Drosnin	Jay S. Goldsamt ("Business Manager")	Daniel Epstein
1964	88th	Donald H. Shapiro	L. Michael Krieger ("Business Manager")	Stanford N. Sesser
1963	87th	Gary A. Schonwald	Burt H. Liebman ("Business Manager")	Norman A. Olch
1962	86th	Dov M. Grunschlag	Jon M. Eckel ("Business Manager")	Doron Gopstein
1961	85th	Allen Young	Paul A. Gitman ("Business Manager")	Eric Levine
1960	84th	Martin B. Margulies	Andrew S. Levine ("Business Manager")	John D. Hack succ. by Arnold Abrams
1959	83rd	William Robert Bishin	Carl A. Steinbaum ("Business Manager")	Nathan Gross
1958	82nd	Robert M. Burd	Barry C. Cooper ("Business Manager")	Allan D. Gochman
1957	81st	Bernard Nussbaum	Kenneth J. Stern ("Business Manager")	Howard J. Orlin
1956	80th	H. Douglas Eldridge	George Leibowitz ("Business Manager")	Bruce R. Buckley
1955	79th	Jonas Schultz	Grover H. Wald ("Business Manager")	Robert R. Siroty
1954	78th	Lee Townsend	Sheldon M. Wolf ("Business Manager")	Gerald M. Pomper
1953	77th	Charles E. Selinske	Lester Friedman ("Business Manager")	Judah L. Berger
1952	76th	Jerry G. Landauer	H. Wallace Kava ("Business Manager")	Donald L. Hymes
1952	76th	Jerry G. Landauer	H. Wallace Kava ("Business Manager")	Rolon W. Reed
1951	75th	Max Frankel	Frank Walwer ("Business Manager")	Lawrence K. Grossman
1951	75th	Max Frankel	Frank Walwer ("Business Manager")	Charles N. Jacobs
1950	74th	David Wise	James A. Williams ("Business Manager")	Peter H. Schiff
1949	73rd	Robert C. Frederiksen	Edward Wolfe ("Business Manager")	Gabriel Favoino (spring semester only; vacant in fall)
1948	72nd	Robert Neil Butler	Vincent A. Carrozza ("Business Manager")	Gene R. Haves
1947	71st	David L. Schraffenberger	Fred De Vries ("Business Manager")	(none)
1946	70th	Edward B. Gold succ. by Alan S. Kuller	David H. Horowitz succ. by Daniel Schimmel ("Business Manager")	Gideon H. Oppenheimer succ. by George T. Vogel
1945	69th	Arthur Lazarus succ. by Stanley Smith	Michael Lichtenstein succ. by Stuart Schwartz ("Business Manager")	(none) (spring semester), Fred M. Kleeberg (fall semester)
1944	68th	Joseph Barata succ. by John Crossett	Norman Levy ("Business Manager")	Matthew T. Kenny succ. by Irwin Oder
1943	67th	Elliott M. Sanger, Jr. succ. by Paul J. Sherman succ. by Walter D. Scott	William Gross succ. by Andrew Rohman ("Business Manager")	Paul J. Sherman succ. by Walter D. Scott succ. by Matthew T. Kenny

== Notable Spec alumni ==
- Rohit Aggarwala, Commissioner of the New York City Department of Environmental Protection
- David Alpern, former senior writer and current contributing editor for Newsweek
- Lou Antonelli, Texas-based science fiction and fantasy author
- R.W. Apple, senior staff writer for The New York Times, serving as a foreign correspondent for over 30 years
- Roone Arledge, sportscaster and head of ABC News; created 20/20 and Nightline in addition to Monday Night Football
- Naftali Bendavid political reporter for The Wall Street Journal and author of The Thumpin': How Rahm Emanuel and the Democrats Learned to Be Ruthless and Ended the Republican Revolution
- Arnold Beichman, conservative commentator
- Damien Bona, former Daily Spectator film critic, film historian and co-author of "Inside Oscar: The Unofficial History of the Academy Awards"
- Katherine Boo, writer for The New Yorker and winner of the Pulitzer Prize
- Marcus Brauchli, former executive editor of The Washington Post and former managing editor of The Wall Street Journal
- Robert Neil Butler, geriatrician
- Ben Casselman, economics reporter for The New York Times
- Bennett Cerf, co-founder of Random House
- Isadora Cerullo, Olympic rugby player
- Ariana Cha, The Washington Post
- Elizabeth Cohen, CNN reporter
- Matthew Cooper, Portfolio columnist
- Matthew Continetti, writer at The Weekly Standard
- David Denby, staff writer for The New Yorker
- I.A.L. Diamond, screenwriter
- Morris Dickstein, noted literary critic and professor at CUNY
- Joe Ferullo, Vice President of Programming and Development for CBS Paramount Domestic Television
- Max Frankel, former executive editor of The New York Times
- Ruth Franklin (née Ruth Halikman), senior literary editor at The New Republic
- Robert Friedman, editor-at-large at Bloomberg
- Julius Genachowski, chairman of the Federal Communications Commission
- Robert Giroux, publisher
- Ralph J. Gleason, music critic
- Neil Gorsuch, U.S. Supreme Court Justice
- Alfred Harcourt, publisher
- Reed Harris, expelled for 20 days, author of King Football, journalist, civil servant, target of McCarthyism
- Frederick William Holls, lawyer, publicist, Secretary of the United States delegation to the Hague Peace Conference
- Langston Hughes, poet, novelist and playwright
- Dan Janison, reporter and columnist for New York Newsday
- David Kaczynski, younger brother of Ted Kaczynski
- Jack Kerouac, Beat Generation novelist
- Bob Klapisch, sportswriter for The Star-Ledger
- Vi Kyuin Wellington Koo, Chinese diplomat
- Adam B. Kushner, editor of the Outlook section at The Washington Post
- Tony Kushner, Pulitzer Prize-winning playwright; author of Angels in America
- Jerry Landauer, Worth Bingham Prize recipient, journalist at The Wall Street Journal
- Arthur Lazarus, Jr., attorney for Indian tribes
- Jonathan Lemire, host of MSNBC's Way Too Early and Politico's White House bureau chief
- Arthur M. Louis, former long-time writer with Fortune magazine, free-lance writer and author
- John R. MacArthur, publisher of Harper's magazine
- Herman J. Mankiewicz, screenwriter
- Joseph L. Mankiewicz, Academy award-winning movie director
- Sam Marchiano, sportscaster, formerly of MLB.com
- Nekesa Mumbi Moody, editorial director of The Hollywood Reporter
- Graham Moore, Academy Award-winning screenwriter
- Michael Mukasey, former US Attorney General
- Pat Mullins, Chairman of Virginia Republican Party
- Michael Musto, New York City journalist and media gadfly
- Bernard W. Nussbaum, former White House counsel to President Bill Clinton
- Jim Ogle, longtime sportswriter for The Star-Ledger and chronicler of the New York Yankees
- Beto O'Rourke, U.S. Representative. Wrote for the Spectator under the name Robert O'Rourke.
- William Barclay Parsons, engineer, founder of Parsons Binckerhoff
- Jed Perl, author and art critic of The New Republic
- Joshua Prager, author and previous special senior projects reporter for The Wall Street Journal
- Robert Pollack (biologist), author and professor of biological sciences
- Gerald M. Pomper, political scientist at Rutgers University
- Ted Rall, political cartoonist
- Ian Rapoport, sportswriter and television analyst, NFL Network
- Cecilia Reyes, journalist who reported on Nutellagate, winner of the Pulitzer Prize for Local Reporting in 2022
- Roger Rubin, sportswriter, New York Daily News
- Harriet Ryan, Pulitzer Prize-winning journalist
- Rob Saliterman, former spokesman for former President George W. Bush
- Nick Schifrin, correspondent for PBS NewsHour and former foreign correspondent for ABC News and Al Jazeera America
- Zach Sims, co-founder of Codecademy
- Warren St. John, The New York Times reporter and author
- Nick Summers, Bloomberg Businessweek editor and co-founder of IvyGate
- Lee C. Townsend, News Editor, CBS Evening News (Cronkite & Rather)
- Richard Wald, former president of NBC
- Steven Waldman, journalist and founder of Beliefnet.com
- Michael Waldman, speechwriter and advisor for President Bill Clinton
- Sharon Waxman, The New York Times reporter
- James Wechsler, chief editor of the New York Post
- Beverly Weintraub, Pulitzer Prize-winning editorial writer
- Lis Wiehl, legal commentator for Fox News
- Mason Wiley, co-author of The Official Preppy Handbook
- Beau Willimon, creator, producer and writer of U.S. miniseries House of Cards
- Herman Wouk, author
- Paul Zimmerman, columnist for Sports Illustrated (as "Dr. Z")
- Paulina Mangubat, political strategist and member of the Democratic National Committee

== See also ==
- The Fed (newspaper)
- Morningside Heights
- List of New York City newspapers and magazines
